= List of University of California, Riverside people =

This is a list of notable alumni and faculty of the University of California, Riverside.

== Notable alumni ==
=== Nobel laureates ===
- Richard R. Schrock – Chemistry, 2005, professor at University of California, Riverside

=== Academia, science, and technology ===
- Peter Adriaens – professor of engineering and entrepreneurship at the selling Biology textbook
- Mason Gaffney – professor of economics and prominent Georgist
- Harmohinder Singh Gill – plant pathologist who pioneered fungus classification by disc electrophoresis
- Lynn G. Gref – technologist and systems engineer
- Anthea M. Hartig – director of the Smithsonian Institution's National Museum of American History (2019–present)
- Matthew Haughey – blogger and founder of MetaFilter
- Marigold Linton – director of American Indian outreach at the University of Kansas
- Todd D. Little – professor of Educational Psychology, Texas Tech University
- Gary North – economist and author
- Arthur Riggs – director of the Beckman Research Institute and former geneticist with Genentech and father of modern biotechnology
- Pedram Salimpour – physician-scientist, author, and professor
- Bettie Steinberg – microbiologist, chief scientific officer for The Feinstein Institutes for Medical Research
- Peter Steinberger – dean of the Faculty at Reed College, Robert H. and Blanche Day Ellis Professor of Political Science and Humanities
- Tim White – professor of integrative biology and research, paleoanthropologist
- Jennifer Wilby – director of the Centre for Systems Studies, University of Hull
- Charles E. Young – first UCR student body president and former chancellor at the University of California, Los Angeles

=== Arts, film, and literature ===
- Mark Andrus – Academy Award-nominated screenwriter, As Good as It Gets
- Earl W. Bascom – inventor, actor, rodeo cowboy, Hall of Fame inductee, international artist and sculptor
- Frank Bidart – Pulitzer Prize-winning poet
- Amine Bouhafa – Tunisian composer and engineer, winner of the 2015 César Award for Best Music for the movie Timbuktu
- Steve Breen – 1998 Pulitzer Prize-winning editorial cartoonist
- Joanna Cameron – actress and model The Secrets of Isis
- Jamie Chung – actress, TV series The Real World: San Diego and films, such as I Now Pronounce You Chuck & Larry, Sorority Row, Grown Ups, The Hangover II
- Billy Collins – eleventh United States Poet Laureate
- Katherine Fugate – screenwriter Valentine's Day and creator of Army Wives TV series
- Elizabeth George – mystery writer
- Barbara Hambly – novelist and screenwriter
- Howard V. Hendrix – science fiction novelist of Better Angels and The Labyrinth Key
- Ryan Holiday – author of Trust Me, I'm Lying: Confessions of a Media Manipulator; director of marketing for American Apparel
- Jordan Howlett – social media personality, known online as "Jordan the Stallion"
- Lisa Kekaula – lead singer for The Bellrays
- Patricia Ja Lee – actress known for role as Cassie Chan as the Pink Ranger in the television series Power Rangers: Turbo and Power Rangers in Space
- Nakul Dev Mahajan – choreographer
- Daryl F. Mallett – author, editor, publisher
- Fatima Farheen Mirza – novelist, A Place for Us
- Steve Nguyen – film director, producer
- Ruben Quesada – poet
- Lindsay Ridgeway – actress, Boy Meets World
- Philip Michael Thomas – actor, Miami Vice
- Charlyne Yi – actress, comedian, and performance artist (Knocked Up)

=== Athletics ===
- Matt Andriese – Major League pitcher for the Seattle Mariners
- Michael Basinger – former professional football player for the Green Bay Packers
- Jennifer Bermingham – golfer
- AnnMaria De Mars – 1984 Judo World Champion, mother of Ronda Rousey
- Pat Hill – head football coach of Fresno State
- Butch Johnson – former professional football player for the Dallas Cowboys and the Denver Broncos
- Joe Kelly – Major League pitcher for the Los Angeles Dodgers
- Aaron Long – professional MLS soccer player for Los Angeles Football Club
- John Lowenstein – former Major League Baseball player
- Steve Lubratich – former Major League Baseball player and current Cleveland Indians Special Assistant to the GM
- Brenda Martinez – track and field athlete
- Gary McCord – professional golfer, CBS announcer and analyst and won the DII individual golf championship in 1970
- Troy Percival – all-time saves leader for the Los Angeles Angels of Anaheim
- Dan Runzler – Major League pitcher for the Boston Red Sox
- Marc Rzepczynski – Major League pitcher for the Arizona Diamondbacks
- Michael Salazar – professional MLS soccer player
- Eric Show – former professional baseball player for the San Diego Padres and Oakland Athletics
- Chris Smith – Major League pitcher for the Oakland Athletics
- Erasmo Solorzano – professional MLS soccer player for the Chivas USA acquired in the 2007 draft
- Brendan Steele – professional golfer on the PGA Tour

=== Business ===
- Gary North – economist
- Shelli Taylor – CEO of Alamo Drafthouse Cinema (2020–present)

=== Politics and law ===
- Ruben Barrales – deputy assistant to President Bush and director of the Office of Intergovernmental Affairs in the White House, former San Mateo County supervisor
- Sabrina Cervantes – current California state assemblywoman for the 60th District
- Paul Cook – former U.S. member of Congress for the CA-08 district, current supervisor for San Bernardino County
- David S. Cunningham, Jr. – Los Angeles City Council member, 1973–87
- Patricia Lock Dawson – mayor of Riverside, 2020–present
- Julie Furuta-Toy – current U.S. ambassador to Equatorial Guinea
- Eduardo Garcia – current California state assemblyman for the 56th District
- Sherilyn Peace Garnett – United States district judge for the United States District Court for the Central District of California (2022–present)
- Michael Huerta – former administrator of the Federal Aviation Administration
- Jerold Krieger – judge for the Los Angeles Superior Court (1988–2002)
- Lloyd Levine – former California state assemblyman for the 40th District
- Jose Medina – current California state assemblyman for the 61st District
- Holly J. Mitchell – current California state senator for the 30th and 26th (2013–2014) districts, former California state assemblymember to the 54th and 47th (2010–2012) districts
- Ronald Neumann – former U.S. ambassador to Algeria
- Rod Pacheco – former Riverside County district attorney, California Assembly member
- Virginia A. Phillips – senior United States district judge of the United States District Court for the Central District of California
- Anthony Rendon – speaker of the California State Assembly (2016–2023)
- Gloria Romero – former State Senate majority whip, former California Assembly member, 49th District
- Stefanie Schaeffer – defense attorney, 2006 winner of The Apprentice
- Marc Steinorth – current California state assemblyman for the 40th District
- Mark Takano – current U.S. representative for the 41st District

=== Other ===
- Jeff Cooper – creator of the modern technique of shooting; firearms expert who defined the modern scout rifle
- John Mack Faragher – historian
- James Holmes – gunman in the 2012 Aurora, Colorado, shooting; currently serving a life sentence for murder
- Shruti Kapoor – economist, women's right's activist, and social entrepreneur
- Anil Raj – humanitarian activist killed in 2019 in a terrorist attack in Kabul while working for U.N.

== Notable faculty ==
- Chris Abani – professor of creative writing and recipient of the Pen Center Freedom to Write Award, Prince Claus Award, a Lannan Literary Fellowship, a Hurston/Wright Legacy Award, and the Hemingway Foundation/PEN Award
- Mark Alber – distinguished professor of mathematics
- Michael F. Allen – distinguished professor of plant pathology
- Barry C. Arnold – distinguished professor of statistics
- Reza Aslan – Professor of Creative Writing, writer, producer, critic, religion scholar, television celebrity James Joyce Award
- Steven G. Axelrod – distinguished professor of English
- John Baez – professor of mathematics, mathematical physicist
- Malcolm C. Baker – distinguished professor of art history
- Alexander A. Balandin – professor of electrical engineering
- Lindon W. Barrett – professor and cultural theorist
- Bir Bhanu – Distinguished Professor of Electrical Engineering, director of the Center for Research in Intelligent Systems
- David F. Bocian – distinguished professor of chemistry
- Alfred M. Boyce – first dean of the College of Agriculture
- Ring Cardé – distinguished professor entomology
- Patricia Cardoso – filmmaker, professor of Film
- Christopher Chase-Dunn – sociologist, contributor to world-systems theory
- Walter Aaron Clark – distinguished professor of music
- Carl F. Cranor – distinguished professor of philosophy
- Sean Cutler – plant scientist noted for discovery of pyrabactin
- Mike Davis – emeritus professor, urban theorist and author MacArthur Fellow in 1998; won the Lannan Literary Award for Nonfiction
- James H. Dieterich – Distinguished Professor of Geophysics, member of the National Academy of Sciences
- Kim Yi Dionne – political scientist
- Josh Emmons – novelist
- Steve Erickson – Distinguished Professor of Creative Writing, author, Lannan Lifetime Achievement Award, Guggenheim Fellowship, American Academy of Arts and Letters Award
- Jay A. Farrell – KA Endowed Professor of electrical and computer engineering
- John Martin Fischer – professor of philosophy, vice president of the Pacific Division of the American Philosophical Association, primary proponent of semi-compatibilism
- Katie Ford – poet
- William T. Frankenberger – distinguished professor of soil science and soil microbiology
- Howard Friedman – professor of psychology
- Theodore Garland, Jr. – a founder of the field of evolutionary physiology
- Peter R. Griffiths – professor of chemistry
- Gail Hanson – Distinguished Professor of Physics
- Allison Adelle Hedge Coke – Distinguished Professor of Creative Writing, poet, writer, Witter Bynner Fellowship, Fulbright Scholar, American Book Award
- Juan Felipe Herrera – emeritus professor, poet, Tomás Rivera Endowed Chair, National Book Critics Circle Award, Guggenheim Fellowship, PEN USA Poetry Award, American Book Award, California State Poet Laureate, United States Poet Laureate
- Russ Hille – distinguished professor of biochemistry
- Ivan Hinderaker – former chancellor
- Nalo Hopkinson – professor of Creative Writing, science fiction and fantasy writer Andre Norton Award and British Fantasy Award
- Theodore L. Hullar – former chancellor
- Howard Judelson – professor of plant pathology
- Peter E. Kaus – professor of physics
- Eamonn J. Keogh – distinguished professor of computer science and engineering
- David B. Kronenfeld – professor of anthropology
- Laila Lalami – professor, Pulitzer Prize finalist
- Michel Lapidus – distinguished professor of mathematics
- Perry Link – Chancellorial Chair, professor of China Studies
- Ronald O. Loveridge – mayor of Riverside, California
- Adam Lukaszewski – professor of botany and plant sciences
- Tom Lutz – Distinguished Professor of Creative Writing, author, literary critic, founder and editor of the Los Angeles Review of Books
- Robert Nisbet – conservative sociologist and early Dean of Letters and Science at UCR
- William H. Okamura – distinguished professor of chemistry
- John W. Olmsted – first chairman of the Humanities division
- Raymond L. Orbach – former chancellor and first Under Secretary of Energy for Science
- Dylan Rodríguez – distinguished professor of Black studies
- Robert Rosenthal – professor of psychology, former chair of Harvard's psychology department
- Evangelos Papalexakis – professor of computer science and engineering
- Michael C. Pirrung – distinguished professor of chemistry
- S. James Press – distinguished professor of statistics
- Donald T. Sawyer – professor of chemistry
- Reinhard Schultz – professor of mathematics
- Richard Seto – professor of physics and astronomy
- Irwin Sherman – professor of biology, specializing in malariology
- Jirka Šimunek – distinguished professor of environmental sciences
- George Edgar Slusser – professor of comparative literature, science fiction expert
- Jane Smiley – Distinguished Professor of Creative Writing, writer, Pulitzer Prize winning author
- Andrea Smith – associate professor in the Department of Media and Cultural Studies, Nobel Peace Prize nominee
- Harry Scott Smith – entomologist
- Jason Stajich – Professor microbiology and plant pathology
- Susan Straight – Distinguished Professor of Creative Writing, writer, National Book Award finalist Lannan Literary Award
- Jennifer Syvertsen – anthropologist
- Karl Taube – professor of anthropology, specializing in research into pre-Columbian Mesoamerican cultures
- R. Ervin Taylor – professor of anthropology
- Bob Toledo – former UCR football coach, 13th head coach of UCLA
- Clifford Trafzer – Costo Distinguished Professor of American Indian Affairs
- John T. Trumble – distinguished professor of entomology
- John V. Tunney – professor of business law, former United States Senator and member of Congress
- Jonathan H. Turner – sociologist, one of the last remaining grand theorists in the discipline, author of Structure of Sociological Theory and Emergence of Sociological Theory
- Seymour Van Gundy – former dean of the College of Natural and Agricultural Sciences
- John Waines – professor of botany and plant sciences
- Georgia Warnke – distinguished Professor of Philosophy and the director of the Center for Ideas and Society
- R. Stephen White – distinguished professor of physics
- Raymond L. Williams – distinguished professor of Hispanic studies
- Jory A. Yarmoff – distinguished professor of physics and astronomy
- Michael R. Zachariah – distinguished professor of chemical engineering and material science

== Administrators ==
The following persons served as chancellor or provost of the University of California, Riverside:

=== List of provosts (1949–1958) ===
No.	Portrait	Provost	Term start	Term end	No.
1		Gordon S. Watkins (Note: First provost.)	1949	June 30, 1956	
2		Herman Spieth (Note: Spieth was appointed provost in 1956 as a replacement to Watkins. When Riverside was upgraded to a general campus in 1958, Spieth was named to the new post of chancellor.)	July 1, 1956	September 1958	

Table notes:

=== List of chancellors (1958–present) ===
No.	Portrait	Chancellor	Term start	Term end	Refs.
1		Herman Spieth	September 1958	June 30, 1964	
2		Ivan Hinderaker	September 1, 1964	June 30, 1979	
3		Tomás Rivera (Note: First minority UC chancellor.)	July 1, 1979	May 16, 1984 (Note: Died in office.)	
– (Note: Executive vice chancellor)		Carlton Bovell	May 16, 1984	June 30, 1984	
acting		Daniel G. Aldrich	July 1, 1984	June 30, 1985	
4		Theodore L. Hullar	July 1, 1985	June 30, 1987	
5		Rosemary S.J. Schraer (Note: First female UC chancellor.)	July 1, 1987	April 10, 1992	
–		Everly B. Fleischer	April 11, 1992	April 19, 1992	
6		Raymond L. Orbach (Note: Although Orbach was supposed to take over from Schraer on July 1, 1992, Schraer unexpected death on April 10 changed everyone's plans. As a result, the UCR Academic Senate invited Orbach to start his new job on April 20.)	April 20, 1992	March 1, 2002	
acting		David H. Warren	March 2, 2002	June 30, 2002	
7		France A. Córdova	July 1, 2002	June 30, 2007	
Acting		Robert D. Grey	July 1, 2007	August 31, 2008	
8		Timothy P. White	September 1, 2008	December 30, 2012	
Acting		Jane Close Conoley	December 31, 2012	August 18, 2013	
9		Kim A. Wilcox	August 19, 2013	July 14, 2025	
10		S. Jack Hu	July 15, 2025	present	

Table notes:
