= Irwin Sherman =

American biologist (1933–2022)

Irwin W. Sherman
- Born: February 12, 1933; New York City
- Died: January 5, 2022 (aged 88)
- Education: B.S., City College of New York (1954): M.S., Northwestern University (1959); Ph.D., Northwestern University (1960)
- Title: Professor Emeritus of Biology
- Spouse: Vilia Gay Turner (m. 1966; died 2009)
- Military career
- Branch: United States Army
- Rank: Private First Class

Irwin William Sherman (February 12, 1933 – January 5, 2022) was a biology professor emeritus. He taught at University of California, Riverside for 42 years and retired as executive vice chancellor. Sherman is known for his studies of malaria.

== Early life ==
Sherman, the son of Russian immigrants Morris and Anna Sherman, graduated from James Monroe High School and enrolled in City College of New York (CCNY) with the goal of becoming a high school biology teacher. Influenced by his professors (James Dawson, William Tavolga, and Herman Spieth particularly) Sherman pursued a graduate degree at University of Florida under the tutelage of W.C. Allee. Sherman's studies were interrupted when he was drafted into the Army as a medical technician. After training at Fort Dix, Fort Sam Houston, and Valley Forge Army Hospital he was sent to overseas to work in army laboratories in Austria and Germany. Upon completion of his military service Sherman chose to teach high school in Yonkers rather than return to graduate school in Florida. While taking graduate courses through CCNY Sherman spent the summer of 1957 at Marine Biological Laboratory where he met his future wife, Vilia Gay Turner. In pursuit of his growing interest in protozoology, Sherman enrolled at Northwestern University to earn his doctorate.

== Career ==
In 1962 Sherman was recruited by his former professor Herman Spieth to join the faculty of University of California, Riverside as an assistant professor. In 1966 Sherman was awarded a Guggenheim Fellowship in the field of molecular and cellular biology. He was promoted to associate professor in 1967 and full professor in 1970. For many years Sherman taught a basic course in parasitology for pre-med students. Sherman reports that while teaching science courses for non-majors, he gave lectures dressed in costume to impersonate famous scientists to increase student interest. By 1981 Sherman became the dean of the College of Natural and Agricultural Sciences and would go on to serve as executive vice chancellor of UCR. After retiring from teaching in 2005 Sherman joined the Scripps Research Institute and at present is a visiting professor in the School of Medicine at the University of California at San Diego.

== Publications ==
Sherman was the author of several books and more than a hundred academic papers. Sherman is most known for popular science books about microbiology with particular emphasis on malariology. In 2005 Sherman edited a textbook, Molecular approaches to malaria, noted for its inclusion of material following the 2002 complete genomic mapping of Plasmodium falciparum. Sherman's 2007 book Twelve Diseases that Changed Our World has been commented upon for its approachable style, having been written for novices and casual readers rather than academic audiences. Similarly, his 2009 The Elusive Malaria Vaccine has been reviewed as being engaging for the lay audience as it describes the history of malaria, particularly in the search for a vaccine. Described by one reviewer as "a story for all curious readers", Sherman's 2011 Magic Bullets to Conquer Malaria was criticized for a lack of either scientific or historical rigor although the book tells interesting stories of malariology.

- Molecular approaches to malaria. Washington, D.C.: ASM Press. 2005. ISBN 978-1-55581-330-7. OCLC 59280201.
- Twelve Diseases that Changed Our World. ASM Press. 2007. ISBN 978-1-55581-466-3. OCLC 141178241.
- The Elusive Malaria Vaccine: Miracle Or Mirage?. ASM Press. 2009. ISBN 978-1-55581-515-8. OCLC 300397208.
- Magic Bullets to Conquer Malaria: From Quinine to Qinghaosu. ASM Press. 2011. ISBN 978-1-55581-543-1. OCLC 710888834.
- The Malaria Genome Projects: Promise, Progress, and Prospects. World Scientific. 2012. ISBN 978-1-84816-903-6. OCLC 809409769.
