= Bocian (surname) =

Bocian is a Polish surname. It may refer to:

- David F. Bocian (born 1950), American chemist
- Elżbieta Bocian (1931–2013), Polish sprinter
- Jacek Bocian (born 1976), Polish sprinter
- Łukasz Bocian (born 1988), Polish footballer
- Paweł Bocian (born 1973), Polish footballer
