= Craner =

Craner is a surname, also spelled Cranor or Crainer. People with that surname include:

- Stuart Crainer, British management author
- Lorne Craner, American foreign policy expert
- William Craner, British sprinter
- Carl F. Cranor, American philosopher and writer
- Jeffrey Cranor, American author
- Roscoe C. Cranor, American politician

== See also ==
- Cramer (disambiguation)
