= Bir Bhanu =

American electrical engineer

- Born: 1951 (age 74–75)
- Citizenship: United States
- Education: University of Southern California, Massachusetts Institute of Technology, University of California, Irvine, Birla Institute of Technology & Science, Pilani, Indian Institute of Technology, BHU, Varanasi
- Scientific career
- Fields: Machine Learning, Computer Vision, Pattern Analysis & Data Mining, Image/Video Databases, Video Networks, Video Bioinformatics
- Workplaces: University of California, Riverside
- Thesis: Shape Matching and Image Segmentation Using Stochastic Labeling (1981)
- Doctoral advisor: Oliver Faugeras
- Website: vislab.ucr.edu/PEOPLE/BIR_BHANU/

Bir Bhanu is an American electrical engineer. He is the Marlan and Rosemary Bourns Endowed University of California Presidential Chair in Engineering, the Distinguished Professor of Electrical and Computer Engineering, and Cooperative Professor of Computer Science and Engineering, Mechanical Engineering and Bioengineering, at the Marlan and Rosemary Bourns College of Engineering at the University of California, Riverside (UCR). He is the first Founding Faculty of the Marlan and Rosemary Bourns College of Engineering at UCR and served as the Founding Chair of Electrical Engineering from 1/1991 to 6/1994 and the Founding Director of the Center for Research in Intelligent Systems (CRIS) from 4/1998 to 6/2019. He has been the director of Visualization and Intelligent Systems Laboratory (VISLab) at UCR since 1991. He was the Interim Chair of the Department of Bioengineering at UCR from 7/2014 to 6/2016.

== Recognition ==
Dr. Bhanu is a Fellow of the Institute of Electrical and Electronics Engineers (IEEE), the American Association for the Advancement of Science (AAAS), the International Association for Pattern Recognition (IAPR), the International Society for Optical Engineering (SPIE), and the American Institute for Medical and Biological Engineering (AIMBE). Bhanu is also a member of ACM, AAAI, and BMES. Bhanu has received university, industry, and conference/journal paper awards for research excellence, outstanding contributions, team efforts, and best papers. He received an award from the President of Honeywell for patented technology on inertial navigation sensor integrated video-based navigation. He received the Dissertation Advisor/Mentoring Award of UC Riverside at the commencement held in June 2011.

== Authored Books ==
Dr. Bhanu is the author of the following books:

- Human Recognition at a Distance in Video
- Human Ear Recognition by Computer
- Synthesis of Pattern Recognition Systems
- Computational Algorithms for Fingerprint Recognition
- Genetic Learning for Adaptive Image Segmentation
- Qualitative Motion Understanding
- Computational Learning for Adaptive Computer Vision
- Video Bioinformatics: From Live Imaging to Knowledge (Edited)
- Multibiometrics for Human Identification (Edited)
- Distributed Video Sensor Networks (Edited)
- Computer Vision Beyond the Visible Spectrum (Edited)
- Deep Learning for Biometrics (Edited)
