= Bocan =

Bocan may refer to:

- Bočan, a Czech surname
- Joe Bocan, a stage name of Johanne Beauchamp (born 1957), Canadian singer and actress
- Bocan Stone Circle, a stone circle in Ireland
- Bauchan, also called bòcan, a type of domestic hobgoblin in Scottish folklore
