= UCR Graduate School of Education =

Institute of Education at the University of California

Coordinates: 33°58′22″N 117°19′47″W

Graduate School of Education
- Type: Public
- Established: 1968
- Academic staff: 21 FTE
- Postgraduates: 267
- Location: 1207 Sproul Hall; University of California; Riverside, CA, USA
- Campus: Suburban
- Website: http://education.ucr.edu/

The Graduate School of Education at the University of California, Riverside offers credentials and MA and PhD programs in various fields of teacher education and educational administration. Significant research centers include the California Community College Collaborative, a professional development, leadership training and policy research institute for the community college system, and the Copernicus Project, dedicated to increasing the quality of science educators and education. Also notable is a center dedicated to researching and supporting education for autistic children.

In 2007 the school encountered controversy due to its lack of a diverse faculty.

== See also ==
- List of University of California, Riverside people
