= Rosemary S. J. Schraer =

American university president (1924–1992)

5th Chancellor of the University of California, Riverside
- In office 1987 – April 10, 1992
- Preceded by: Theodore L. Hullar
- Succeeded by: Raymond L. Orbach

Personal details
- Born: Rosemary Schmidt; October 1, 1924 Oneida County, New York, US
- Died: April 10, 1992 (aged 67) Riverside, California, US
- Scientific career
- Education: Syracuse University (BS, MS, PhD)
- Fields: Biochemistry
- Workplaces: Sage College; Syracuse University; Harvard Medical School; Penn State University; University of California, Riverside
- Thesis: Certain phosphorylated carbohydrate intermediates in Neurospora crassa (1953)

Rosemary S. J. Schraer (October 1, 1924 – April 10, 1992) was the fifth chancellor of the University of California, Riverside from 1987 to 1992. Schraer was the first female chancellor in the history of the University of California system.

== Early life ==
Schraer was born near Utica in upstate New York on October 1, 1924. Her parents were Rose (née Ortner) and Ulysses S. Schmidt, a lumber buyer for the New York Central Railroad.

She earned an A.B. in chemistry from Syracuse University in 1946. She was a class officer and the student body president. She continued at Syracuse, receiving a master's degree in sociology and a Ph.D. in biochemistry in 1953. While at Syracuse, she organized the first graduate student association in the Biochemistry Department and was its first president. She was also elected president of the graduate association.

== Career ==
After college, Schraer was a research associate at the Albert Einstein Medical Center in Philadelphia. She taught biochemistry and biophysics at Sage College, Syracuse University, and Pennsylvania State University. She was at Penn State from 1959 to 1981, serving as its assistant provost from 1978 to 1981 and associate provost from 1981 to 1985. She was a visiting professor at Harvard Medical School and Cavendish College at the University of Cambridge.

Schraer was appointed executive vice chancellor under Chancellor Theodore L. Hullar in 1985. In 1987, Hullar was reassigned to UC Davis and Schraer was appointed as the first female chancellor in the history of the UC system.

During her tenure, Schraer promoted the university as an outstanding research institution and increased external giving from $3 million to over $12 million annually. She also oversaw the development of a campus growth master plan that allowed the campus to expand to accommodate 18,000 students. Schraer announced her intent to retire at the end of the 1991–92 academic year, but she died on April 10, 1992.

== Personal life ==
She married Harald Schraer in 1952. He was a biology professor at Penn State. They had one son, David J. Schraer.

Raised Catholic, she later joined the Quakers.

Schraer died on April 10, 1992, after having suffered a stroke on April 8.

After Schraer died, the Rosemary S. J. Schraer Endowed Memorial Scholarship was created with gifts from various donors and her husband. The scholarship provides support to undergraduates who combine outstanding leadership with exceptional academic achievement and service to the campus community.
