= Barry C. Arnold =

British-born American statistician (born 1939)

- Born: December 6, 1939 (age 86); London, England
- Occupation: Statistician

Academic background
- Education: McMaster University; Stanford University
- Thesis: A Co-Related Urn-Scheme for a Continuum of Responses (1966)
- Doctoral advisor: Patrick Suppes

Academic work
- Institutions: Iowa State University; University of California, Riverside

Barry Charles Arnold (born December 6, 1939) is a British-born American mathematical statistician. He was a distinguished professor in the department of statistics at the University of California, Riverside.

== Education and career ==
Arnold was born in London, United Kingdom. His family moved to Canada in 1952. Arnold initially enrolled in the engineering program at McGill University in 1956 but transferred to McMaster University in 1958 when his family moved to Hamilton, Ontario. At McMaster, he switched to mathematics and graduated with a bachelor's degree in 1961 in mathematics with a statistics specialization. He completed a M.S. and Ph.D. at Stanford University. His thesis advisor was Patrick Suppes.

In 2001, Arnold was named a fellow of the American Association for the Advancement of Science.
