= Bourns College of Engineering =

Engineering school at the University of California, Riverside

Coordinates: 33°58′30″N 117°19′37″W

Marlan and Rosemary Bourns College of Engineering
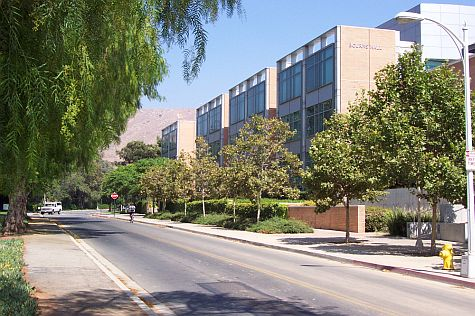
- Bourns Hall
- Type: Public
- Established: 1989
- Dean: Christopher S. Lynch
- Academic staff: 135
- Undergraduates: 2,864
- Postgraduates: 948
- Location: Riverside, CA, California, USA
- Website: www.engr.ucr.edu/

The Marlan and Rosemary Bourns College of Engineering, commonly known as 'Bourns Engineering' or 'BCOE', is a college of engineering at the University of California, Riverside. The college was established in 1989, and named in honor of Marlan and Rosemary Bourns, founders of Bourns, Inc. It is accredited by the Accreditation Board for Engineering and Technology.

Winston Chung Hall

Winston Chung Hall, part of the Engineering complex

Some of the research centers include the Center for Environmental Research & Technology, Winston Chung Global Energy Center, Center for Research and Education in Cyber Security and Privacy, and the Center for Research in Intelligent Systems.

== Academics ==
The Bourns College of Engineering has five departments, four interdepartmental programs, and an online master's program. The college confers degrees in the following fields:

- Bioengineering (B.S., M.S., Ph.D)
- Chemical engineering (B.S., M.S., Ph.D.)
- Computer science (B.S., M.S., Ph.D.)
- Computer Science with Business Applications (B.S.)
- Computer engineering (B.S., M.S., Ph.D)
- Electrical engineering (B.S., M.S., Ph.D.)
- Environmental engineering (B.S., M.S., Ph.D.)
- Materials science and engineering (B.S., M.S., Ph.D.)
- Mechanical engineering (B.S., M.S., Ph.D.)
- Robotics (B.S., M.S.)

== Research centers ==
- Center for Industrial Biotechnology
- Center for Advanced Neuroimaging
- The Bourns College of Engineering Center for Environmental Research and Technology (CE-CERT)
- Center for Research and Education in Cyber Security and Privacy
- Center for Research in Intelligent Systems (CRIS)
- Phonon Optimized Engineering Materials
- Ubiquitous Communication by Light Center (UC-Light)
- Winston Chung Global Energy Center

== Professional student organizations ==
=== Diversity Organizations ===
- Bourns College of Engineering Students Leadership Council
- National Society of Black Engineers (NSBE)
- Society of Hispanic Professional Engineers (SHPE)
- Society of Women Engineers (SWE)

=== Professional Engineering Societies ===
- Association for Computing Machinery (ACM)
- American Institute of Chemical Engineers (AIChE)
- American Society of Mechanical Engineers (ASME)
- Air and Waste Management Association (AWMA)
- Biomedical Engineering Society (BMES)
- Chemical and Environmental Engineering Graduate Student Association (CEEGSA)
- Computer Science Graduate Student Association (COMPGSA)
- Citrus Hack
- Engineers Without Borders (EWB)
- IEEE Electron Devices Society (EDS)
- Institute of Electrical and Electronics Engineers (IEEE)
- Institute of Transportation Engineers (ITE)
- Mechanical Engineering Graduate Student Association (MEGSA)
- Materials Research Society (MRS)
- Optical Society of America (OSA)
- Society of Automotive Engineers (SAE)
- Theta Tau

=== Honor Societies ===
- Tau Beta Pi (TBP) California Alpha Beta

== See also ==
- List of University of California, Riverside people
