= Jirka Šimunek =

Czech-American hydrologist

- Born: Czechoslovakia
- Education: Czech Technical University in Prague
- Occupation: Hydrologist

Jirka Šimunek is a Czech-American hydrologist. He is a distinguished professor in the department of environmental sciences at the University of California, Riverside.

In 2016, Šimunek was named a fellow of the American Association for the Advancement of Science, and in 2021, he was awarded the Hydrologic Sciences Award by the American Geophysical Union.
