= Evangelos Papalexakis =

Greek computer scientist

- Born: Athens, Greece
- Education: Technical University of Crete (Diploma, MSc); Carnegie Mellon University (PhD)
- Occupation: Computer scientist
- Website: www.cs.ucr.edu/~epapalex/

Evangelos E. Papalexakis, also known as Vagelis Papalexakis, is a Greek computer scientist. He is the Ross Family Term Chair in the department of computer science and engineering at the University of California, Riverside.

Papalexakis was born in Athens. In 2010, he received a diploma in electronic and computer engineering from the Technical University of Crete in Greece. He received an M.Sc. degree from the same university in 2011. From 2011 to 2016, he completed his Ph.D. degree at Carnegie Mellon University. His research interests include data mining and tensor decomposition, crossing the fields of signal processing and data science.

Papalexakis worked for Microsoft Research and Google Research before joining UC Riverside in 2016. In 2021, he was awarded the National Science Foundation CAREER Award. The same year, the International Conference on Data Science and Advanced Analytics, sponsored by the Institute of Electrical and Electronics Engineers, named him a "next generation data scientist". he also received the 2022 Tao Li Award of the IEEE International Conference on Data Mining. He was named to the Ross Family Chair in 2024.
