= Donald T. Sawyer =

American chemist

- Born: Donald Turner Sawyer; January 10, 1931
- Died: c. 2017 (aged 85–86)
- Education: University of California, Los Angeles
- Occupation: Chemist

Donald Turner Sawyer (January 10, 1931 – c. 2017) was an American chemist. He was a distinguished professor in the department of chemistry at the University of California, Riverside.

In 1978, Sawyer was named a fellow of the American Association for the Advancement of Science.

Sawyer died in 2017.
