= Bettie Steinberg =

American microbiologist

Bettie M Steinberg
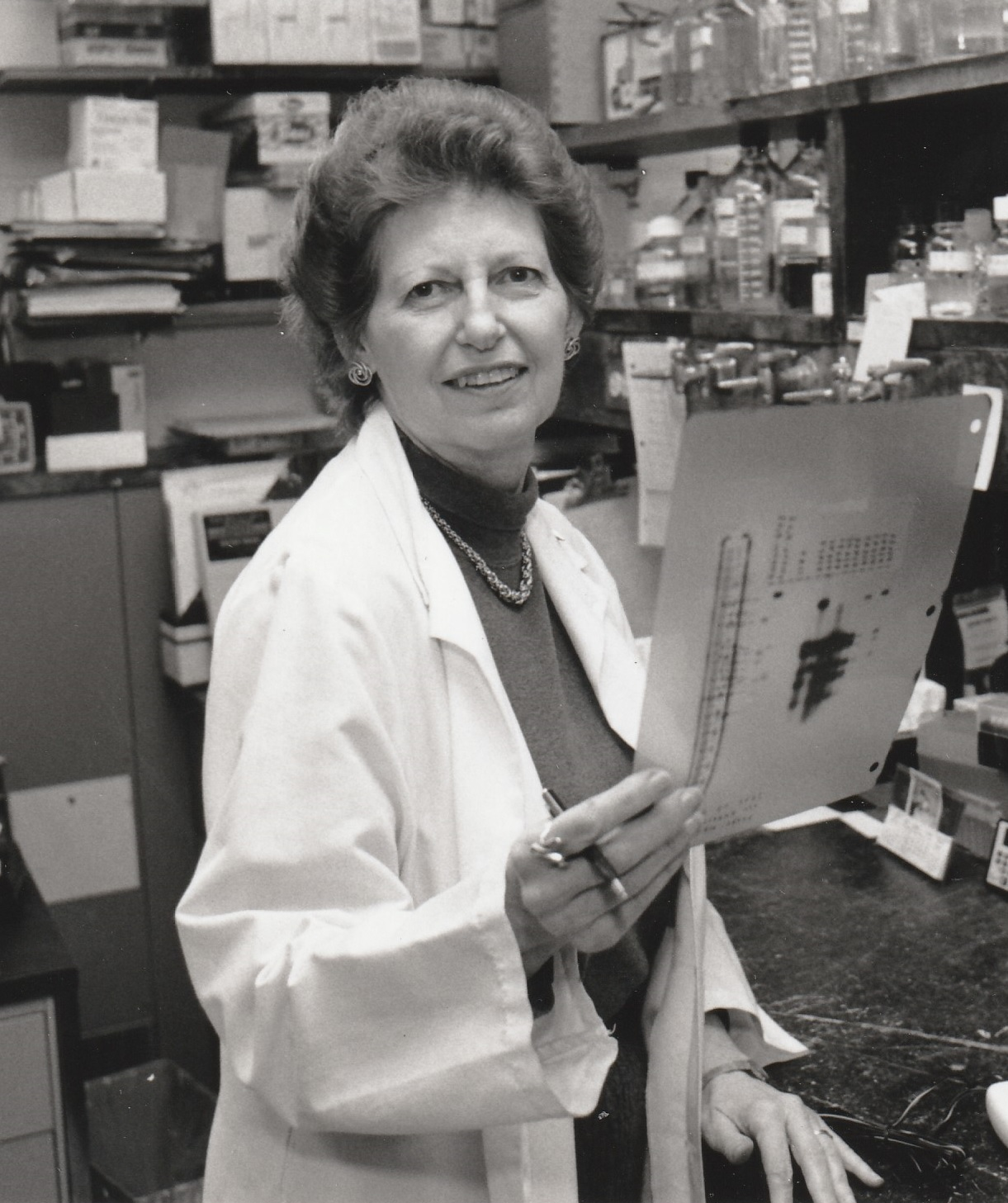
- Born: 13 June 1937 (age 89)
- Education: University of California, Riverside, Adelphi University, SUNY Stony Brook
- Occupation: Scientist
- Employer: Feinstein Institutes for Medical Research
- Known for: Medical Research

Bettie M. Steinberg (born 13 June 1937) is an American scientist who studies molecular biology with a focus on the pathophysiology of human papillomaviruses (HPVs).

== Education ==
Steinberg completed her undergraduate degree at the University of California, Riverside in 1959. She earned a Master's degree in biology from Adelphi University. In 1973, she returned to academia for her PhD in microbiology, which she received from the State University of New York, Stony Brook, in 1976 for her work on bacterial viruses; she then did a post-doctoral fellowship at SUNY Stony Brook, studying mammalian tumor viruses.

== Academic appointments ==
After her post-doctoral fellowship, Steinberg moved to Columbia University, where she spent two years as a Senior Research Associate. She then joined the Department of Otolaryngology at Long Island Jewish Medical Center and joined The Feinstein Institutes for Medical Research when it was established in 2000. She then served as senior advisor and professor at The Feinstein Institutes for Medical Research, provost at the Elmezzi Graduate School of Molecular Medicine (both in Manhasset, New York), and professor at the Department of Molecular Medicine at the Hofstra Northwell School of Medicine in Hempstead, NY. From 1989 to 2011 she served as professor of Otorhinolaryngology-Head & Neck Surgery and of Microbiology & Immunology at the Albert Einstein College of Medicine, and is a founding officer and member of the International Papillomavirus Society Board of Directors.

== Principal scientific contributions ==
Steinberg began her research on human papillomaviruses (HPVs) and their association with diseases of the head and neck, particularly recurrent respiratory papillomatosis, at Long Island Jewish Medical Center. These studies were supported by grants from the National Institute of Health (NIH) beginning in 1983.

In collaboration with Dr. Allan Abramson, Steinberg contributed to knowledge that HPVs can establish latent infections and can serve as the source of recurrent disease. Steinberg also contributed to the study of the cell signaling cascades of papilloma cells.

Steinberg among the nation’s leading researchers into the human papillomavirus (HPV), particularly its effects on the respiratory system to cause the disease recurrent respiratory papillomas. One of Dr. Steinberg’s major discoveries was that HPV can exist in the body in a latent, or “silent” form without causing disease, and that many people carry HPV with no problems. That raised the question: why do some people get respiratory papillomas with HPV infection, while most do not. Dr. Steinberg and her collaborators have identified a number of genetic variants of the immune system that put certain people at greater risk for HPV-induced diseases.

== Awards and honors ==
- Robert K. Match Distinguished Scientist Award
- Long Island Achiever in Science Award from Long Island Center for Business and Professional Women
- Elliot Osserman Award from the Israel Cancer Research Fund
- Karl Storz Award from the American Society of Pediatric Oncology
- Lorinda de Roulet Award for Excellence in Research
- Israel Cancer Research Fund Award for Women of Excellence
- Science Achiever Award from the School-Business Partnerships of Long Island, Inc.
- Leonard Marsh Memorial Scientific Achievement Award from AWSM (Advancing Women in Science and Medicine)
- Lifetime Achievement Award from the International Papillomavirus Society
