= Michael C. Pirrung =

American organic chemist

- Born: 1955 (age 70–71)
- Education: University of Texas at Austin; University of California, Berkeley
- Occupation: Organic chemist

Michael C. Pirrung (born 1955) is an American organic chemist. He is a distinguished professor in the department of chemistry at the University of California, Riverside.

In 1995, Pirrung was named a fellow of the American Association for the Advancement of Science.
