= Reinhard Schultz =

American mathematician

- Education: University of Chicago
- Occupation: Mathematician

Reinhard Schultz is an American mathematician. He was a professor in the department of mathematics at the University of California, Riverside.

In 2001, Schultz was named a fellow of the American Association for the Advancement of Science.
