= David B. Kronenfeld =

American anthropologist

- Education: Harvard University; Stanford University
- Occupation: Anthropologist

David B. Kronenfeld is an American anthropologist. He was a professor in the department of anthropology at the University of California, Riverside.

In 1983, Kronenfeld was named a fellow of the American Association for the Advancement of Science.
