= Adam Lukaszewski =

Polish-American geneticist

- Education: Warsaw University of Life Sciences
- Occupation: Geneticist

Adam Lukaszewski is a Polish-American geneticist. He is a professor in the department of botany and plant sciences at the University of California, Riverside.

In 2003, Lukaszewski was named a fellow of the American Association for the Advancement of Science.
