= UCLA College of Letters and Science =

College of the University of California, Los Angeles

Coordinates: 34.07162°N 118.43869°W

- Motto: Fiat lux Let there be light
- Type: Public
- Established: May 23, 1919
- Parent institution: University of California, Los Angeles
- Dean: Humanities: Alexandra Minna Stern; Life Sciences: Tracy L. Johnson; Physical Sciences, senior dean: Miguel García-Garibay; Social Sciences: Abel Valenzuela Jr. Undergraduate Education: Adriana Galván
- Location: Los Angeles, California, United States
- Campus: Urban
- Mascot: Bruins
- Website: college.ucla.edu

The UCLA College of Letters and Science (or simply UCLA College) is the arts and sciences college of the University of California, Los Angeles (UCLA). It encompasses the Life and Physical Sciences, Humanities, Social Sciences, Honors Program and other programs for both undergraduate and graduate students.

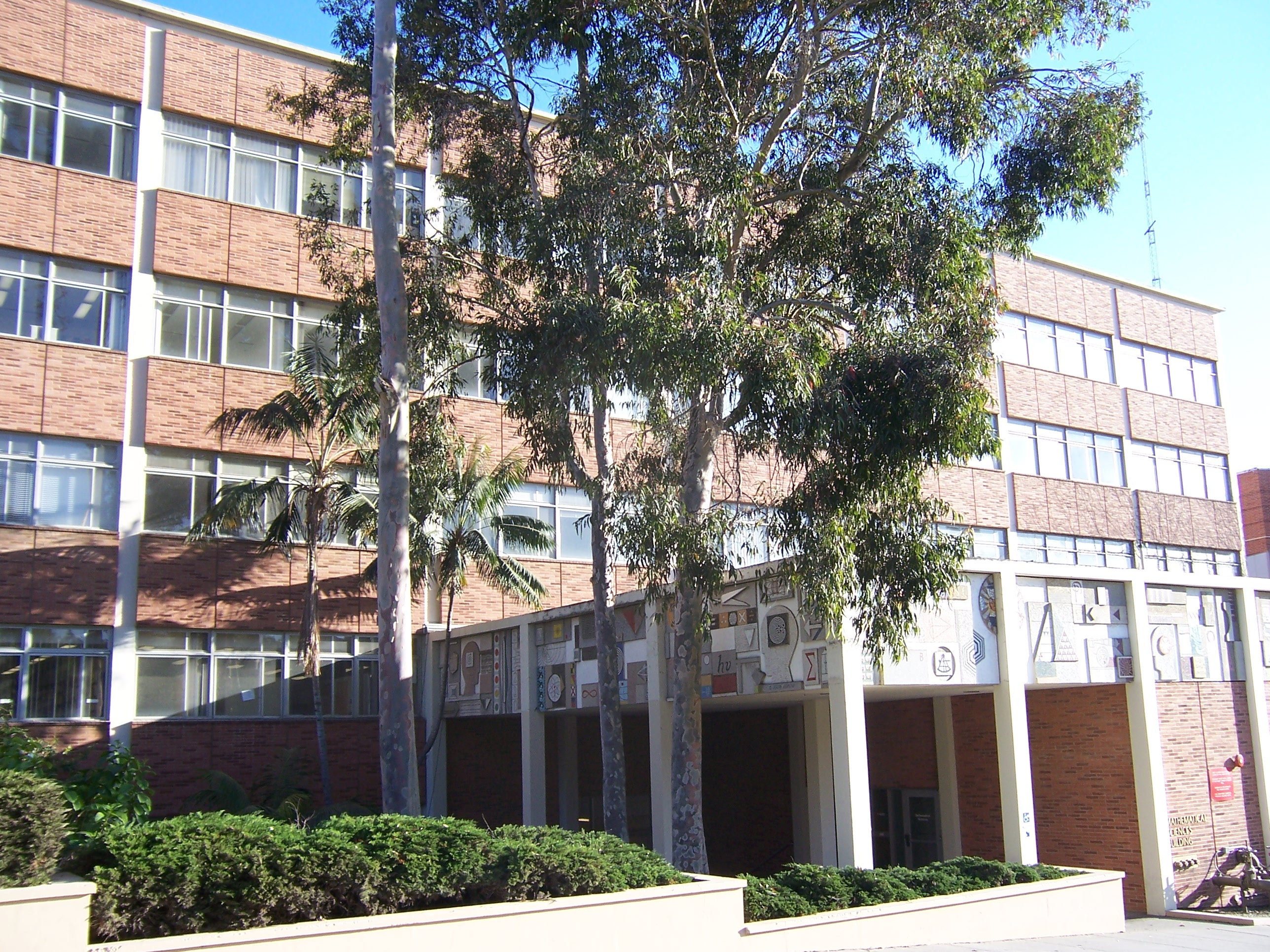
Mathematical Sciences Bldg.

The College is the largest academic unit at UCLA and the largest in the entire UC system. The bulk of UCLA's student body belongs to the College, which includes 50 academic departments, 99 majors, 25,000 undergraduate students, 2,700 graduate students and 900 faculty members.

== History ==
The College originated on May 23, 1919, the day when the Governor of California (William D. Stephens) signed a bill into law which officially established the Southern Branch of the University of California. At that time, a two-year Junior College was established as the university's general undergraduate program. The Junior College held its first classes on September 15, 1919 for 260 undergraduates.

At its inception, the Junior College was truly a junior college in both name and fact, because it offered only a two-year lower-division program. Young people interested in earning bachelor's degrees were required to proceed to the Berkeley campus or other universities to attend upper-division third- and fourth-year courses. The inferior two-year program was intolerable to the many Southern Californians who had fought to establish the southern branch. They vigorously lobbied the Regents of the University of California for a third year of instruction at the southern branch, which was promptly followed by demands for a fourth year. The Southern Californians finally prevailed on December 11, 1923, when the UC Board of Regents approved a fourth year of instruction.

At that time, the Junior College was transformed into the College of Letters and Science (named after its northern counterpart at Berkeley) and was expressly authorized to award the Bachelor of Arts degree. Charles H. Rieber, a philosophy professor, was named the first dean of the new four-year college. The College's original departments in 1923 were chemistry, economics, English, French, history, mathematics, philosophy, physics, political science, psychology, Spanish, and zoology.

On June 12, 1925, the College awarded its first Bachelor of Arts degrees to 98 women and 30 men.

According to UC President Clark Kerr, the political science department at UCLA College in his experience was the second-strongest program in the entire UC system after the chemistry program at Berkeley. To date, three faculty members of the UCLA political science department have become UC chancellors (as listed below).

== Criticism ==
The main disadvantage of the gigantic size of the College (as with its counterpart at Berkeley) is a coldly impersonal undergraduate experience, especially in large lower-division survey courses (before students declare specific majors, begin to work more closely with department advisers and faculty members in their chosen major, and switch to smaller upper-division courses). It is because of this specific issue that UC president Clark Kerr experimented with residential college systems at the newer UC campuses at San Diego and Santa Cruz.

== Divisions ==
The College encompasses five divisions — Humanities, Life Sciences, Physical Sciences, and Social Sciences, as well as the Division of Undergraduate Education, which includes 83% of UCLA's undergraduate students.

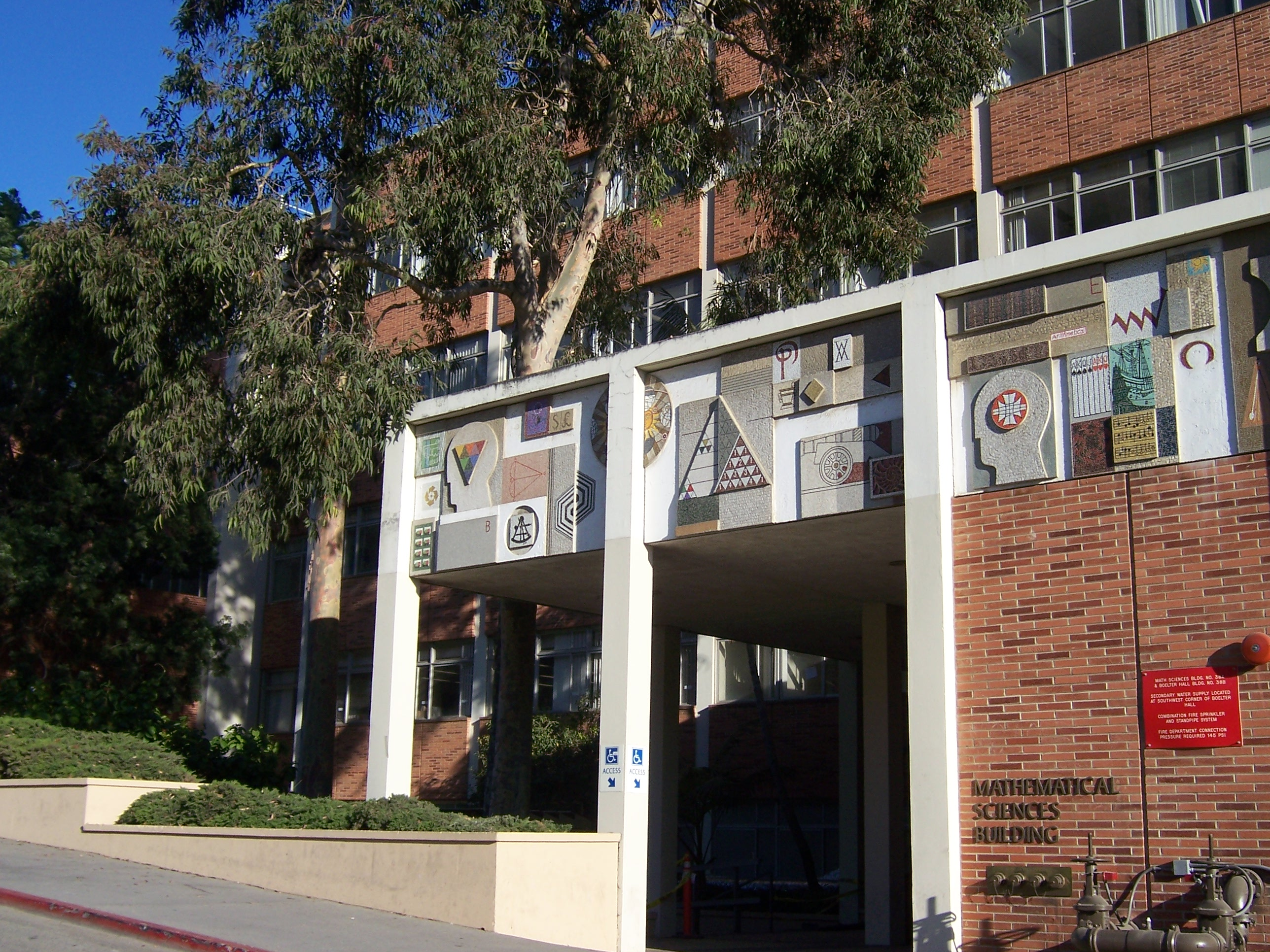
UCLA's Math-Sciences Bldg.

== Alumni ==
- Kay Ryan, English, 16th poet laureate of U.S.
- Brad Delson, Linkin Park member
- Richard Heck, 2010 Nobel Prize in chemistry
- Paul Terasaki, organ transplant medicine and tissue typing
- Ezra Klein, The New York Times columnist and co-founder of Vox (website)
- Juan Felipe Herrera, social anthropology, 21st poet laureate of U.S.
- Randall Park, English, actor, comedian and writer
- Sara Bareilles, communication studies, award-winning singer and songwriter
- Kareem Abdul-Jabbar, history, former professional basketball player who played 20 seasons in the NBA for the Milwaukee Bucks and the Los Angeles Lakers
- Mayim Bialik, neuroscience, actress, game show host and author
- Ralph Bunche, political science, diplomat and Nobel Peace Prize laureate
- Gabrielle Union, sociology, actress
- Kal Penn, sociology, actor, author, and former White House staff member in the Barack Obama administration.

== Notable faculty ==
- Utpal Banerjee, department chair and professor of molecular, cell and developmental biology; professor of biological chemistry, American Academy of Arts and Sciences
- Jared Diamond, professor of geography, American Academy of Arts and Sciences, National Medal of Science recipient and MacArthur Fellowship (1985)
- Alessandro Duranti, professor of anthropology, American Academy of Arts and Sciences
- Saul Friedländer, MacArthur Fellowship (1999)
- Andrea Ghez, MacArthur Fellowship (Genius Grant winner, 2008), professor of physics and astronomy
- Ivan Hinderaker, professor of political science and department chair, 2nd chancellor of UC Riverside
- Thomas M. Liggett, professor of mathematics, National Academy of Sciences
- Thom Mayne, professor of architecture, American Academy of Arts and Sciences
- Dean McHenry, professor of political science, 1st chancellor of UC Santa Cruz
- Calvin Normore, professor of philosophy, American Academy of Arts and Sciences
- Raymond L. Orbach, professor of physics, provost of UCLA College, 6th chancellor of UC Riverside
- Theodore Porter, professor of history and department vice chair for undergraduate affairs, American Academy of Arts and Sciences
- Charles Ray, professor of sculpture, American Academy of Arts and Sciences
- Debora Silverman, professor of history and art history, American Academy of Arts and Sciences
- Terence Tao, Fields Medal–winning mathematician, National Academy of Sciences, MacArthur Fellowship 2006)
- Paul Terasaki, organ transplant medicine and tissue typing
- Gordon Samuel Watkins, professor of economics, dean of UCLA College, founding provost of UC Riverside
- Charles E. Young, professor of political science, 4th chancellor of UCLA
- Heather Maynard, professor of chemistry and biochemistry, 2023 inductee of the American Academy of Arts and Sciences
- Harryette Mullen, professor of English, 2023 inductee of the American Academy of Arts and Sciences
- Daniel Treisman, professor of political science, 2023 inductee of the American Academy of Arts and Sciences
- Miguel García-Garibay, professor of chemistry and biochemistry, dean of the division of physical sciences, senior dean of the UCLA College, 2023 inductee to the National Academy of Sciences
- Min Zhou, professor of sociology and Asian American studies, 2023 inductee to the National Academy of Sciences
- Michael Berry, professor of contemporary Chinese cultural studies and 2023 Guggenheim Fellow
- Prineha Narang, professor of physics, 2023 Guggenheim Fellow
- Alex Purves, professor of classics, 2023 Guggenheim Fellow
- Michael Rothberg, professor of English and comparative literature, 2023 Guggenheim Fellow

== Commencement ceremonies ==
The main graduation commencement ceremony for the College of Letters and Science is held annually on a Friday night in June in Pauley Pavilion. For two years in a row, the scheduled commencement keynote speaker had canceled the engagement. Bill Clinton canceled in 2008 for not wanting to cross a picket line. Actor and alumnus James Franco canceled in 2009 because of his filming scheduling conflicts. Rock band Linkin Park's Brad Delson accepted the last minute invitation to speak at the 2009 commencement ceremony. Mayim Bialik cancelled in 2016 for not wanting to cross a picket line.

In various years, UCLA has received criticism from students for the relative obscurity of commencement speakers.

- 2005 – Sesame Workshop CEO Gary Knell
- 2006 – Mayor of Los Angeles Antonio Villaraigosa
- 2007 – Former professional basketball player Kareem Abdul-Jabbar
- 2008 – UCLA chancellor Gene Block
- 2009 – Linkin Park guitarist Brad Delson
- June 11, 2010 – Columnist Gustavo Arellano of '¡Ask a Mexican!'
- 2011 – Former Peace Corps director Aaron S. Williams
- June 15, 2012 – Kiva and ProFounder co-founder Jessica Jackley
- June 14, 2013 – Basketball Hall of Famer Ann Meyers Drysdale
- June 13, 2014 – Nobel laureate Randy Schekman
- June 12, 2015 – Intellectual Ventures co-founder Nathan Myhrvold
- June 10, 2016 – BlackRock Chairman and CEO Laurence Fink
- June 16, 2017 – Former UCLA basketball player and first African American woman LAPD area captain Anita Ortega
- June 15, 2018 –
- June 14, 2019 – Former NASA astronaut Dr. Anna Lee Fisher
- June 12, 2020 – Actor and activist George Takei
- June 11, 2021 – Civic leader and social justice advocate D'Artagnan Scorza
- June 10, 2022 – Gymnast and activist Katelyn Ohashi
- June 16, 2023 – Actor, comedian and writer Randall Park
- June 14, 2024 – Actor and activist Sean Astin
- June 13, 2025 – Singer-songwriter Sara Bareilles

== See also ==
- College of Letters and Science
