= Peter Adriaens =

American academic

- Education: Ghent University (BSc & Msc) University of California, Riverside (Ph.D.)
- Occupations: Professor and entrepreneur
- Known for: Specialized in clean technology development

Peter Adriaens is a professor of engineering and entrepreneurship at the University of Michigan, specializing in the field of clean technology development.

== Career ==
=== Academic career ===
Peter Adriaens graduated with a B.Sc. from the University of Ghent, Belgium, in 1984 and an M.Sc. in 1986 from the same institution. Afterwards, he earned a PhD in Environmental Sciences from the University of California, Riverside. While completing his PhD, Adriaens was involved in experts surrounding the biodegradation of PCBs via two strains of bacteria. His research was presented to the American Society for Microbiology in May 1989. He has also completed postdoctoral work at Stanford University. Since early 2010s, Adriaens has been a professor of civil and environmental Engineering at the University of Michigan and a professor of entrepreneurship at the Ross Business School of the university. He also has been serving as the cleantech director of the university's Wolverine Venture Fund. He has been a Distinguished Professor of Entrepreneurship at the Sichuan University in Chengdu. He is a past president of the Association of Environmental Science and Engineering Professors.

=== Clean technology development and finance ===
Adriaens worked as a consultant on both the Exxon Valdez oil spill and the Gulf War oil spill, and has been interviewed about other oil spills in his capacity as an environmental engineer. He has also been interviewed on entrepreneurship issues, such as the valuation of newly public companies. At times he has been interviewed about the intersection between both engineering and entrepreneurship, in addition to the cleantech industry.

Adriaens is a director of the Watershed Capital Group. Adriaens has made contributions to the field of Environmental Finance, especially in the field of cleantech clusters. He is the founder of Global CleanTech LLC, and a Director for CleanTech Acceleration Partners as well as for the Global CleanTech Cluster Association. In addition, he is appointed at Limnotech as academic in residence and director of Asian operations.

== Publishing ==
Adriaens has authored over 100 peer-reviewed articles and book chapters. For example, Adriaens co-authored the chapter "Teaching Entrepreneurial business strategies in global markets: a comparison of cleantech venture assessment in the US and China" with Timothy Faley, in the 2011 book Entrepreneurship Education in Asia. In the chapter the authors describe China as the global leader in developing clean energy technology and the critical link that venture capital has played in promoting the success of the industry there. They also discuss the methodologies behind the university education of entrepreneurs in this region—specifically in the Chinese province of Sichuan, where Adriaens had previously taught. He has been published in journals including International Biodeterioration and Biodegradation, Federation of European Microbiological Societies Microbiology Ecologies, Environmental Science & Technology, and the Journal of Microbiological Methods.

Adriaens has also written op-eds for newspapers including the Financial Times. His published articles in the press include a December 2011 article in Forbes Magazine, which he argues a new approach (KeyStone Compact) to assess valuation of tech companies to avoid a new tech bubble. In March 2011 he also argued for the need of a new business model for US-China competition, in which Chinese investors more "flush with cash" could legitimately invest in U.S. R&D, in a way that both sides find beneficial - in order to trigger positive trade flow from China to the US and help solve IP infringement issues.
