= Robert D. Grey =

Acting Chancellor of the University of California, Riverside
- In office May 2007 – June 2008
- Preceded by: France A. Córdova
- Succeeded by: Timothy P. White

Personal details
- Education: Washington University in St. Louis; Phillips University
- Profession: Cellular and molecular biology, administrator
- Institutions: UC Davis; UC Riverside

Robert D. Grey is a long-time academic administrator and researcher and educator in the field of cellular and molecular biology. He has spent the majority of his career in positions in the University of California system, including interim provost of the UC system, acting chancellor at UC Riverside and provost and executive vice chancellor at UC Davis. He was also a well-regarded and award-winning faculty member at UC Davis.

== UC System ==
Grey was named the interim provost of the University of California System, effective August 20, 2008. He succeeded Wyatt R. Hume. Grey stepped down from the position in early 2009 and was replaced by Lawrence H. Pitts.

== UC Riverside ==
Grey was the acting chancellor at UC Riverside from May, 2007 through June, 2008. Grey served following the departure of France A. Córdova for the presidency of the Purdue University and prior to the hiring of Timothy P. White from the University of Idaho.

Prior to his appointment as acting chancellor, Grey was the executive assistant to the chancellor for health affairs, serving as consultant on UCR's successful medical school proposal

As acting chancellor, Grey oversaw completion of the final proposal for the UCR School of Medicine and gained approval for a new School of Public Policy.

== UC Davis ==
In his 30-plus year career at UC Davis, Grey served as chief academic and financial office, chief governance official for UC Davis Medical Center and as an executive vice chancellor before leaving in 2001.

Grey was a well-regarded faculty member at UC Davis, emphasizing on research in the biology of fertilization and cell biology. He has been a reviewer and consultant for professional journals as well.

== Educational Background ==
Grey completed his undergraduate education at Phillips University in Oklahoma with a B.S. degree in biology, and subsequently earned a Ph.D. from Washington University in St. Louis. He also conducted post-graduate research at Washington University.

== Awards and honors ==
A partial list of awards and honors.

- Distinguished Teaching Award - UC Davis Academic Senate
- Magnar Ronning Award for Teaching Excellence - UC Davis
- Phillips University Distinguished Alumni Award
