= Michael F. Allen =

American plant pathologist

- Born: Michael Fred Allen
- Education: Southwestern College; University of Wyoming
- Occupation: Plant pathologist

Michael Fred Allen is an American plant pathologist. He was a distinguished professor in the department of microbiology and plant pathology at the University of California, Riverside.

Allen attended Southwestern College, earning his BS degree in biology in 1974. He also attended the University of Wyoming, earning his MS degree in 1977 and his PhD degree in botany in 1980. After earning his degrees, he worked as a research associate in the department of plant pathology at the University of Nebraska–Lincoln from 1980 to 1981, and worked as a research assistant professor in the department of biology at Utah State University.

In 2003, Allen was inducted into the Southwestern College Natural Sciences Hall of Fame.
