= Jay A. Farrell =

American electrical engineer

- Education: Iowa State University; University of Notre Dame
- Occupation: Electrical engineer

Jay A. Farrell is an American electrical engineer. He was the KA Endowed Professor in the department of electrical and computer engineering at the University of California, Riverside.

Farrell attended Iowa State University, earning his BS degree in physics and electrical engineering in 1986. He also attended the University of Notre Dame, earning his MS degree in 1988 and his PhD degree in 1989. After earning his degrees, he worked as a principal investigator at Charles Stark Draper Laboratory from 1989 to 1994.

In 2008, Farrell was named a fellow of the Institute of Electrical and Electronics Engineers, "for contributions to intelligent, autonomous vehicle analysis and design", and in 2010, he was named a fellow of the American Association for the Advancement of Science.
