= John Waines =

American geneticist

- Born: John Giles Waines
- Education: University of California, Los Angeles; University of California, Riverside
- Occupation: Geneticist

John Giles Waines is an American geneticist. He was a professor in the department of botany and plant sciences at the University of California, Riverside.

In 1991, Waines was named a fellow of the American Association for the Advancement of Science.
