= Jason Stajich =

American microbiologist

- Born: Jason E. Stajich
- Education: Duke University
- Occupation: Microbiologist

Jason E. Stajich is an American microbiologist. He is a professor in the department of microbiology and plant pathology at the University of California, Riverside.

Stajich attended Duke University, earning his BS degree in computer science in 1999, and his PhD degree in genetics and genomics in 2006. After earning his degrees, he worked as a postdoctoral fellow at the University of California, Berkeley. In 2014, he was awarded the C. J. Alexopolous Prize by the Mycological Society of America, and in 2019, he was named a fellow of the American Society for Microbiology.

In 2020, Stajich was named a fellow of the American Association for the Advancement of Science.
