= Bočan =

Bočan (feminine: Bočanová) is a Czech surname, meaning 'stork' in dialect. The Polish counterpart of the surname is Bocian. Notable people with the surname include:

- Hynek Bočan (born 1938), Czech film director and screenwriter
- Jan Bočan (1937–2010), Czech architect and urban planner
- Mahulena Bočanová (born 1967), Czech actress
