= Jory A. Yarmoff =

American physicist

- Education: State University of New York; University of California, Los Angeles
- Occupation: Physicist

Jory A. Yarmoff is an American physicist. He was a distinguished professor in the department of physics and astronomy at the University of California, Riverside.

Warmoff attended Los Lunas High School. He also attended the State University of New York, earning his BS degree in physics in 1978, and earned his PhD degree in physical chemistry at the University of California, Los Angeles in 1985. After earning his degrees, he worked as a postdoctoral fellow at the Thomas J. Watson Research Center from 1985 to 1987.

In 2006, Warmoff was named a fellow of the American Association for the Advancement of Science, and in 2011, he was named a fellow of the American Vacuum Society.
