= Malcolm C. Baker =

English art historian and writer

- Education: University of Edinburgh
- Occupations: Art historian, writer

Malcolm C. Baker is an English art historian and writer. He was a distinguished professor in the department of the history of art at the University of California, Riverside.

In 2015, Baker wrote the book The Marble Index: Roubiliac and Sculptural Portraiture in Eighteenth-Century Britain, published by Yale University Press.
