= John T. Trumble =

American entemologist

- Education: University of Delaware; Virginia Tech
- Occupation: Entomologist
- Spouse: Mary Lou Trumble
- Children: 3

John T. Trumble is an American entomologist. He was a distinguished professor in the department of entomology at the University of California, Riverside.

== Life and career ==
Trumble attended the University of Delaware, earning his BS degree in entomology and applied ecology in 1974. He also attended Virginia Tech, earning his MS degree in 1977 and his PhD degree in 1980.

Trumble served as a professor in the department of entomology at the University of California, Riverside from 1980 to 2019. During his years as a professor, in 2004, he was named a fellow of the American Association for the Advancement of Science, and was named a distinguished professor in 2011.
