= Gail Hanson =

American particle physicist (born 1947)

Gail G. Hanson
- Born: February 22, 1947 (age 79); Dayton, Ohio
- Education: Massachusetts Institute of Technology
- Awards: Panofsky Prize (1996)
- Scientific career
- Fields: Physics (high-energy particle physics)
- Workplaces: University of California, Riverside

Gail G. Hanson, born 22 February 1947 in Dayton, Ohio is an American experimental particle physicist.

== Career ==
Hanson received her PhD from Massachusetts Institute of Technology in 1973. She spent sixteen years at SLAC National Accelerator Laboratory, first as a research assistant and then as a permanent staff member. Whilst there, Hanson participated in the discovery of the J/psi meson and tau lepton. Her work led to the first evidence for quark jet production in electron-positron annihilation, for which she was awarded the 1996 Panofsky Prize with Roy Schwitters.

In 2002 she was appointed Distinguished Professor of Physics at the University of California, Riverside.

== Awards and honors ==
- Fellow of the American Physical Society
- Fellow of the American Association for the Advancement of Science
- John Simon Guggenheim Memorial Foundation Fellow
- Winner of the W.K.H. Panofsky Prize in Experimental Particle Physics from the American Physical Society (1996)
