= Dylan Rodríguez (scholar) =

American Ethnic studies scholar and writer

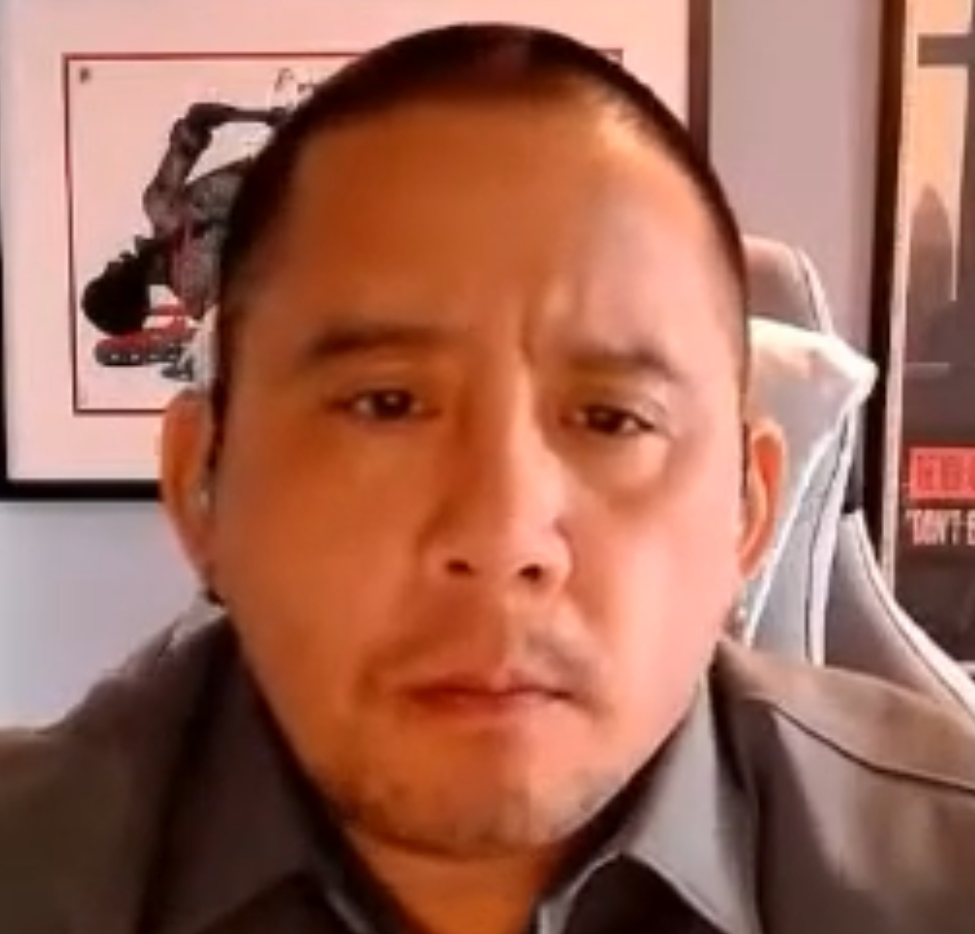
- Rodríguez in 2021
- Education: Cornell University; University of California, Berkeley
- Occupations: Ethnic studies scholar, writer

Dylan Rodríguez is an American Ethnic studies scholar and writer. He is a distinguished professor in the department of Black studies at the University of California, Riverside.

In 2020, Rodríguez published his book, White Reconstruction: Domestic Warfare and the Logics of Genocide, through Fordham University Press. The book was recognized with the Frantz Fanon Award by the Caribbean Philosophical Association.
