= Michael R. Zachariah =

American chemical engineer

- Born: Michael Russel Zachariah
- Education: University of California, Los Angeles (PhD)
- Occupation: Chemical engineer
- Website: mrzgroup.ucr.edu

Michael Russel Zachariah is an American chemical engineer. He is a distinguished professor in the department of chemical engineering and material science at the University of California, Riverside. He previously was the Patrick and Marguerite Sung Distinguished Professor in the department of chemical engineering and chemistry at the University of Maryland, College Park. His areas of research include energetics and nanomaterials, aerosol dynamics, and advanced reaction diagnostics.

In 2011, Zachariah was awarded the David Sinclair Award by the American Association for Aerosol Research.
