= David F. Bocian =

American chemist

- Born: David Frank Bocian; 1950 (age 75–76)
- Education: North Carolina State University; University of California, Berkeley
- Occupation: Chemist

David Frank Bocian (born 1950) is an American chemist. He was a distinguished professor in the department of chemistry at the University of California, Riverside.

In 2000, Bocian was named a fellow of the American Association for the Advancement of Science.
