= William H. Okamura =

American chemist

- Born: William Hiroki Okamura; 1941 (age 84–85)
- Education: University of California, Los Angeles; Columbia University
- Occupation: Chemist

William Hiroki Okamura (born 1941) is an American chemist. He was a distinguished professor in the department of chemistry at the University of California, Riverside.

In 1998, Okamura was named a fellow of the American Association for the Advancement of Science.
