= Theodore L. Hullar =

American university chancellor (1935–2025)

Theodore Lee Hullar
- Born: March 19, 1935
- Died: September 28, 2025 (aged 90)
- Occupation: Chancellor

Theodore Lee Hullar (March 19, 1935 – September 28, 2025) was Chancellor of the University of California, Riverside from 1985 to 1987 and Chancellor of the University of California, Davis from 1987 to 1994. A biochemist by training, he was one developer of the Hanessian–Hullar reaction.
