= UCR College of Natural and Agricultural Sciences =

College

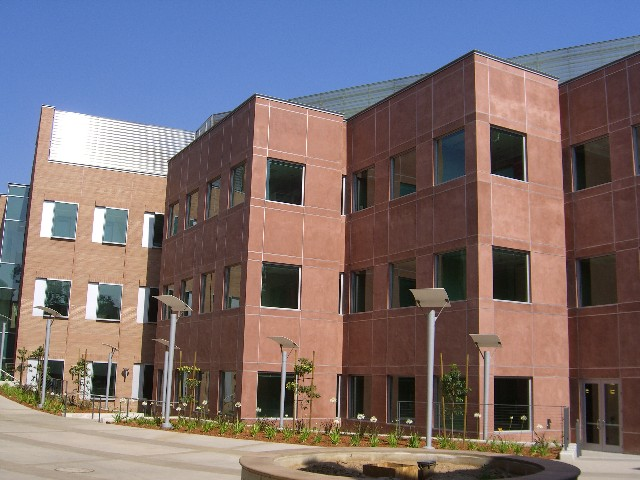
Biological Science Building

The College of Natural and Agricultural Sciences (CNAS) at the University of California, Riverside, has 13 academic departments: Biochemistry, Biology, Botany and Plant Sciences, Cell Biology and Neuroscience, Chemistry, Earth Sciences, Entomology, Environmental Sciences, Mathematics, Nematology, Physics, Plant Pathology and Microbiology, and Statistics.

The college dates back to 1907, when the UC Citrus Experiment Station was founded at the base of Riverside's Mt. Rubidoux. In 1958, the College of Agriculture was formed as the first research-oriented, graduate degree-granting institution at UCR. Steady growth and a series of mergers led to the 1974 formation of the present College of Natural and Agricultural Sciences. Notable research centers include the Center for Invasive Species Research (CISR), and the Institute for Integrative Genome Biology.

== See also ==
- List of University of California, Riverside people
