= Anil Raj =

American human rights activist (1984–2019)

- Born: April 1, 1984
- Died: November 24, 2019 (aged 35); Kabul, Afghanistan
- Citizenship: United States
- Education: University of California, Riverside; University of Denver
- Occupation: Human rights activist
- Employer: UNDP

Anil Raj (April 1, 1984 – November 24, 2019) was an American human rights activist who served on the board of Amnesty International. He was killed on November 24, 2019, while working on the United Nations Development Programme when the vehicle he was travelling in with two colleagues was attacked.

== Early life and education ==
UNDP logo

Raj was raised in Saratoga, California, in an Indian American family and attended Saratoga High School and graduated in 2002. He completed his undergraduate studies at University of California, Riverside, participating in a study abroad program at the University of Hong Kong, and graduating in 2006 with a bachelor’s degree in political science. At U.C. Riverside he was active in Pi Sigma Alpha, the National Political Science Honor Society, Model United Nations and Amnesty International. He then earned a Masters in International Human Rights as well as a Certificate in Humanitarian Assistance at the Josef Korbel School of International Studies at the University of Denver in Colorado. He was honored there with the Brinser Award for humanitarian service.

== Career ==
After his studies, Raj worked with Amnesty International, serving in Washington, D.C., as the country specialist for Myanmar. Beginning in 2010 he served on Amnesty International’s board of directors for a year.

He worked for the UNDP for over nine years. The UNDP is engaged in approximately 170 countries and is focused on ending poverty. Raj's work spanned several countries, including Myanmar, South Sudan and Afghanistan. His first assignment was as a disarmament, demobilization and reintegration reports officer in South Sudan. He served in Afghanistan from 2015 to 2018. He then spent a year working as an independent consultant in the San Francisco Bay Area. He then returned to Afghanistan in November 2019 as a management specialist for UNDP.

== Legacy ==
U.S. Secretary of State Mike Pompeo announced Raj's death at a news conference and described attacks targeting U.N. personnel who are aiding the Afghan people as “unconscionable.” Taliban and the Islamic State groups are active in the region, but no group had claimed responsibility at the time of Pompeo's announcement.

Janet Lord, board of directors chair of Amnesty International USA, issued a statement about Raj's legacy and the impact of his death. "Anil served as a country specialist for Amnesty International USA from 2007-2010 and was a member of the board of directors from 2010-2011. Anil is remembered as a bright and creative individual, who always brought innovation to his work and warmth to his relationships. The way that Anil’s life was cut tragically short underscores the grave dangers that human rights workers in Afghanistan face. Threatened by all sides in a conflict that continues to claim civilian lives daily, they are left at risk. Amnesty International USA calls on the international community to remember Anil and on the Afghan government to promptly and thoroughly investigate the attacks and bring those responsible to justice.”

Raj was survived by his parents and twin sister.
