= Gordon S. Watkins =

American educator and author

Gordon Samuel Watkins (March 9, 1889 – May 5, 1970) was an educator, author, and leading figure in the field of labor economics during the early to mid-twentieth century. Watkins also served from 1949 to 1956 as the first provost of the University of California, Riverside.

== Biography ==
=== Early life and education ===
Watkins was born March 9, 1889, in Brynmawr, Wales, to a poor Welsh coal miner. In 1906, he emigrated to the United States and attended Fargo College Academy in Fargo, North Dakota, and Wheaton College Academy in Wheaton, Illinois. He received his A.B. from the University of Montana in 1914, his M.A. from the University of Illinois in 1915, and his Ph.D. in economics from the University of Pennsylvania in 1918.

=== Professional life ===
Nowhere in American higher education at the present time is there any man who more fruitfully unites broad and searching educational vision with a precise sense of the procedures necessary to the fulfillment of that vision. Under Provost Watkins' leadership I do not doubt for a moment that we shall achieve at UCR a college that will become as noted for its moral development of character as for its intellectual eminence.

— Robert Nisbet (1953)

In 1925, Watkins joined the faculty at the University of California, Los Angeles as a professor of economics and went on to serve as the dean of the College of Letters and Science from 1936 to 1946. UC President Robert Gordon Sproul named Watkins as the first provost of the proposed campus at Riverside in 1949 and tasked him with establishing the new campus. The University of California, Riverside opened in February 1954 as a result of Watkins's successful efforts to not only integrate the new campus with the pre-existing Citrus Experiment Station but to also gain widespread local public acceptance of the initiative. Watkins retired from UC Riverside in 1956 and went on to serve as the acting dean of the new School of Education at the University of California, Santa Barbara in 1961–1962, and dean 1962–1965.

In his memoirs, UC President Clark Kerr portrayed Watkins as a tragic figure who died a broken man. Kerr came to visit Watkins in Santa Barbara after Watkins's retirement and found that "this once cheerful and effervescent personality was mute and despondent." Watkins came very close to creating one of the finest liberal arts colleges in the United States at Riverside, but his dream of a liberal arts college was immediately overtaken by politics and circumstances beyond his control, and the Board of Regents soon decided to turn Riverside into a full-fledged research university.

In addition to his career as an educator, Watkins also served in varying capacities as an advisor and consultant. He was appointed by Presidents Franklin D. Roosevelt and Harry S. Truman as a member of fact-finding and labor arbitration boards, was a member of a federal mediation board panel, was an advisor to the Danish Committee on Public Monopolies, and counselor and director of the Building and Loan Institute of Los Angeles.

=== Personal life ===
Watkins met Anna Davis during his time at the University of Montana and the couple went on to get married.

=== Death and legacy ===
Gordon S. Watkins died on May 5, 1970, in Santa Barbara at the age of 81. UC Riverside's religious center was named Watkins House in his honor as was Watkins Hall which was named for him in 1966. The Watkins Oak was later planted beside Watkins 1000 to honor him as well and Watkins Drive runs past the Chancellor's residence on the outskirts of campus. The personal papers of Gordon Watkins and his wife Anna were donated to UC Riverside.

== Works ==
- Labor Problems and Labor Administration in the United States During the World War. University of Illinois Studies in the Social Sciences, vol. 8, no. 4. Urbana, IL: University of Illinois, 1920.
- "Revolutionary Communism in the United States," American Political Science Review, vol. 14, no. 1 (Feb. 1920), pp. 14–33.
- An Introduction to the Study of Labor Problems. New York: Thomas Y. Crowell Co., 1922.
- The Background of Economics. With Merlin H. Hunter. New York: McGraw-Hill, 1923.
- The Management of Labor Relations. With Paul A. Dodd. New York: McGraw-Hill, 1938.
- Labor Problems. With Paul A. Dodd. New York: Thomas Y. Crowell Co., 1940.
- Labor in the American Economy. Philadelphia, 1951.
