= Paweł Bocian =

Polish association football player

Personal information
- Date of birth: 9 April 1973 (age 53)
- Place of birth: Poznań, Poland
- Height: 1.86 m (6 ft 1 in)
- Position: Defender

Senior career*
Years	Team	Apps	(Gls)
–1990	Unia Swarzędz		
1990–1995	Olimpia Poznań	70+	(1+)
1995–1997	Lech Poznań	48	(3)
1997–1999	Fortuna Düsseldorf	37	(0)
1999–2000	Lech Poznań	18	(1)
2000	Wisła Płock	11	(2)
2001–2002	Widzew Łódź	9	(0)
2002	Widzew Łódź II		
2003	Persib Bandung		
2003	Kujawiak Włocławek		
2004	Mieszko Gniezno		
2004	Unia Swarzędz		
2012	Kolejorz Poznań		
2012–2015	Lech Poznań (oldboys)		
- * Club domestic league appearances and goals

Paweł Bocian (born 9 April 1973) is a Polish former professional footballer who played as a defender.

== Career ==
In 1997, Bocian signed for Fortuna Düsseldorf in the German second division.

Before the 2003 season, he signed for Persib Bandung, Indonesia's most successful club, but was considered redundant due to 3 foreign players allowed to be on the pitch and left after refusing to play as a sweeper.

In 2003, he signed for Kujawiak Włocławek in the Polish lower leagues.
