= Ivan Hinderaker =

American educator and academic administrator (1916–2007)

- 1941 portrait of Hinderaker during his time in the Minnesota House of Representatives

2nd Chancellor of the University of California, Riverside
- In office 1964–1979
- Preceded by: Herman Spieth
- Succeeded by: Tomás Rivera

Ivan Henrik Hinderaker (29 April 1916 – 23 September 2007) was an American educator and academic administrator. He served as the second chancellor of the University of California, Riverside from 1964 to 1979. At the time, Hinderaker was the longest-serving chancellor of any University of California campus (although his record was later surpassed by UCLA's Charles E. Young). Hinderaker Hall at UC Riverside was named in his honor.

== Background ==
Hinderaker was born in Hendricks, Minnesota. He was the son of Theodore Hinderaker (1884-1962) and Clara Gustava (Hanson) Hinderaker (1887-1972). He received his bachelor's degree from St. Olaf College in 1938, and his master's and Ph.D. degrees from the University of Minnesota. He was a member of the Minnesota House of Representatives from 1941 to 1942 and served in the U.S. Army Air Forces from 1943 to 1946. After teaching one year at the University of Minnesota, Hinderaker joined the UCLA faculty in political science in 1949, eventually serving as department chair. In 1963 he was named vice chancellor/academic affairs at UC Irvine, where he served for one year until his appointment as chancellor at UC Riverside.

== Chancellorship at UC Riverside ==
Hinderaker became Chancellor of the University of California, Riverside (UCR) in 1964. During Hinderaker's term, UCR underwent rapid expansion of its facilities and curriculum. This expansion included the creation of the Biomedical Sciences Program, the College of Natural and Agricultural Sciences, and the Graduate School of Education. Hinderaker oversaw a massive expansion of UC Riverside's curriculum to include numerous professional programs geared toward engineering, medicine, and administration. Hinderaker endeared himself to students during the anti-war protests in the 1960s by inviting protestors into his office for coffee and doughnuts. Hinderaker and former UC Regent Phil Boyd pushed for construction of the carillon tower, a landmark on the UCR campus. He also fought for the UCR/California Museum of Photography.
