= Herman Spieth =

American entomologist (1905–1988)

1st Chancellor of the University of California, Riverside
- In office 1962–1964
- Succeeded by: Ivan Hinderaker

Personal details
- Born: August 21, 1905
- Died: October 20, 1988 (aged 83)
- Education: Indiana Central College; Indiana University Bloomington
- Profession: Professor, chancellor, zoologist
- Scientific career
- Workplaces: College of the City of New York; Columbia University; University of California, Riverside
- Doctoral advisor: Alfred Kinsey

Herman Spieth (21 August 1905 – 20 October 1988) was an American zoologist and university administrator. He was the first chancellor of the University of California, Riverside from 1956 to 1964. Originally hired as a professor in the Life Sciences Department, he was responsible for administering UCR's change from a liberal arts college to a major research university. Spieth Hall at UCR is named after him.

Spieth served the University of California for 20 years, first as professor of Zoology and Chairman of the Department of Life Sciences at the newly founded UC campus at Riverside, and then as provost and the first chancellor of the Riverside campus, and finally as chairman of the Department of Zoology at UC Davis. He retired in 1973 and devoted full-time to his research on the evolutionary biology of Drosophila.

== Biography ==
=== Early years ===
Spieth grew up as a farm boy in Indiana where a childhood of hunting, fishing, and farming stimulated an early interest in biology. He began his studies at Indiana Central College where, his parents felt, a year of study would qualify him for a high school teaching position. He took to the academic life and majored in zoology. Graduating in 1926, he went on to Indiana University Bloomington, where he worked under Alfred Kinsey studying the evolution and taxonomy of mayflies, and received his Ph.D. in 1931.

=== Career ===
From 1932 to 1953, (with a hiatus during the war) Spieth was at the College of the City of New York, where he taught a diversity of courses—comparative anatomy, field biology, general biology and parasitology. During this time he was also a lecturer in the Graduate Division at Columbia University, where he taught a course on the biology of insects. He also taught marine and freshwater biology during some summers at the Cold Spring Harbor Biological Laboratories on Long Island, and was visiting professor at the University of Texas and the University of Minnesota where he also taught summer courses. From 1932 to 1953 he was also a research associate with a laboratory at the American Museum of Natural History.

During the Second World War, Spieth was a captain in the United States Army Air Forces, serving as head of the Navigation Department at Cochran Field in Macon, Georgia, and later as assistant director of the School for Altitude Physiology in Florida. He became friends with Theodosius Dobzhansky at Columbia University and Ernst Mayr at the American Museum of Natural History, both of whom encouraged him to explore the mating behavior of Drosophila. At the Museum he was also associated with Frank Beach and Edwin Colbert and others.

A new period of Spieth's professional life began with his move, in 1953, to a newly established Riverside campus of the University of California. At UCR he organized the Division of Life Sciences and assembled its initial faculty. In 1956 he was appointed Provost and two years later, when UCR became a general campus, Spieth became its first chancellor. During his years at UCR he taught general biology, and continued to serve as a laboratory teaching assistant even after he became chancellor. His term as chancellor was busy as he presided over the change to a general campus, directed the construction of new buildings, established the Philip L. Boyd Deep Canyon Desert Research Center, facilitated the development of graduate programs and successfully managed the "student problems of the 60s" which entailed the delicate task of maintaining order while protecting academic freedom.

In 1964, he stepped down as chancellor and after a sabbatical leave moved to the Davis campus where he became chair of the Department of Zoology. In this capacity he presided over the major expansion of the department, including the planning and construction of Storer Hall, the new home for the department. He also acquired undeveloped land on the campus for field research which subsequently was designated the Herman T. Spieth Natural History Preserve. While engaged in these activities, at the same time he personally participated in experimenting with new teaching methods for large classes—in his case, General Biology. Many former students from this period and back to his early years in New York City have great praise for him as a teacher.

During his career he served on a great many university committees, but his profound interest in education extended beyond his university. He was appointed to the Committee on Biological Sciences Curriculum of the American Institute of Biological Sciences and also served on several accreditation committees of the Western Association of Schools and Colleges.

Most of Spieth's lifelong research activities were evolutionary in nature: systematics, behavior, especially mating behavior, and evolutionary ecology. In his early work the organism of interest was the mayfly (Ephemeroptera). He constructed the definitive systematics of this organism while working out the basic ecology of many of the species. He then turned to the genus Drosophila. These studies were started in New York—with the collaboration of Dobzhansky and his group, and continued for the rest of his career.

He focused on mating behavior and concomitant sexual isolation. He first worked out the basic experimental techniques for analysis and then proceeded to describe the evolution of mating behavior throughout the genus, which was a pioneering contribution to a now flourishing field. Later on he was one of the founders of the Hawaiian Drosophila project, which is now comparable to, and in some way surpasses, the evolutionary studies of Darwin's finches. He participated as guest investigator at the Genetic Foundation at the University of Texas, Austin (the initial mainland headquarters) and on numerous occasions as visiting colleague at the University of Hawaii. He contributed much to the ecological description of this species as well as applying his special expertise in describing their mating behavior and his was a substantial contribution to the synthesis of their evolutionary relationships. Most of this research was done during the Davis period and a great deal of it during his emeritus years.

His final years were spent studying the ecology of Drosophila in the Blodgett Forest in the Sierra Mountain Range near Davis. His last paper was a description of these findings published in the Pan Pacific Entomologist in 1988. His first publication was also on ecology, describing the bottom fauna of Lake Wawasee, Indiana. This was published in 1928. His contribution to science thus spanned 60 years.
