= Carl F. Cranor =

American philosopher and writer

- Education: University of California, Los Angeles; Yale Law School
- Occupations: Philosopher, writer

Carl F. Cranor is an American philosopher and writer. He was a distinguished professor in the department of philosophy at the University of California, Riverside.

Cranor attended the University of California, Los Angeles, earning his PhD degree in 1971. He also attended Yale Law School, earning his Master of Studies in law in 1981. After earning his degrees, from 1985 to 1986, he worked as a congressional fellow for George Brown Jr., a U.S. representative. In 1993, he wrote the book Regulating Toxic Substances: A Philosophy of Science and the Law, published by Oxford University Press.

In 1998, Cranor was named a fellow of the American Association for the Advancement of Science.
