= University of California, Riverside =

Public university in Riverside, California

Coordinates: 33°58′32″N 117°19′52″W

- Motto: Fiat lux (Latin)
- Motto in English: "Let there be light"
- Type: Public land-grant research university
- Established: February 14, 1954; 72 years ago
- Parent institution: University of California
- Accreditation: WSCUC
- Academic affiliations: AAU; APRU; URA; space-grant
- Endowment: $249.87 million (2023)
- Budget: $1.3 billion (2023)
- Chancellor: S. Jack Hu
- Provost: Elizabeth Watkins
- Faculty: 1,638
- Administrative staff: 1,938
- Students: 26,809 (2022)
- Undergraduates: 22,903 (2022)
- Postgraduates: 3,906 (2022)
- Location: Riverside, California, United States
- Campus: 2,131 acres (862 ha); Large city
- Other campuses: Palm Desert
- Newspaper: The Highlander
- Colors: Blue and gold
- Nickname: Highlanders
- Sporting affiliations: NCAA Division I – Big West; MPSF
- Mascot: Scotty Highlander
- Website: ucr.edu

The University of California, Riverside (UCR or UC Riverside) is a public land-grant research university in Riverside, California, United States. It is one of the ten campuses of the University of California system. The main campus sits on 1,900 acres (769 ha) in a suburban district of Riverside with a branch campus of 20 acres (8 ha) in Palm Desert. In 1907, the predecessor to UCR was founded as the UC Citrus Experiment Station, which conducted research in biological pest control and the use of growth regulators.

UCR's undergraduate College of Letters and Science opened in 1954. The Regents of the University of California declared UCR a general campus of the system in 1959, and graduate students were admitted in 1961. To accommodate an enrollment of 21,000 students by 2015, more than $730 million has been invested in new construction projects since 1999. UCR plans to have 35,000 students by 2035. Preliminary accreditation of the UC Riverside School of Medicine was granted in October 2012 and the first class of 50 students was enrolled in August 2013. It is the first new research-based public medical school in 40 years. UCR is a member of the Association of American Universities.

In 2000, UC Riverside was classified as an "R1: Doctoral Universities – Very high research activity." UCR's sports teams are known as the Highlanders and play in the Big West Conference of the National Collegiate Athletic Association (NCAA) Division I. Their nickname was inspired by the high altitude of the campus, which lies on the foothills of Box Springs Mountain.

== History ==
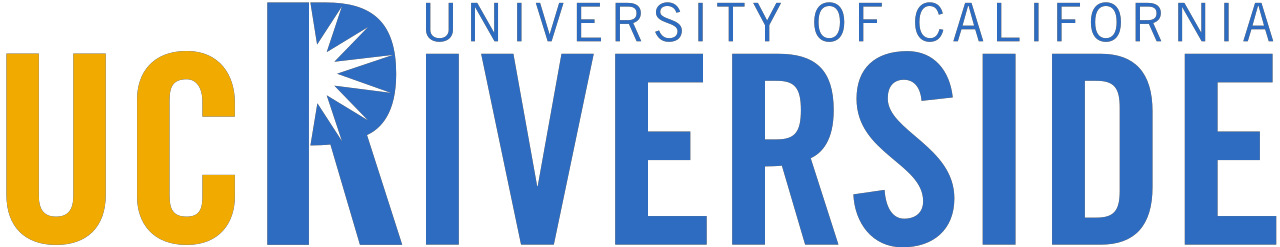
The older logo for the University of California, Riverside used from September 2006 to July 2020; still seen on some signs, packaging, and marketing

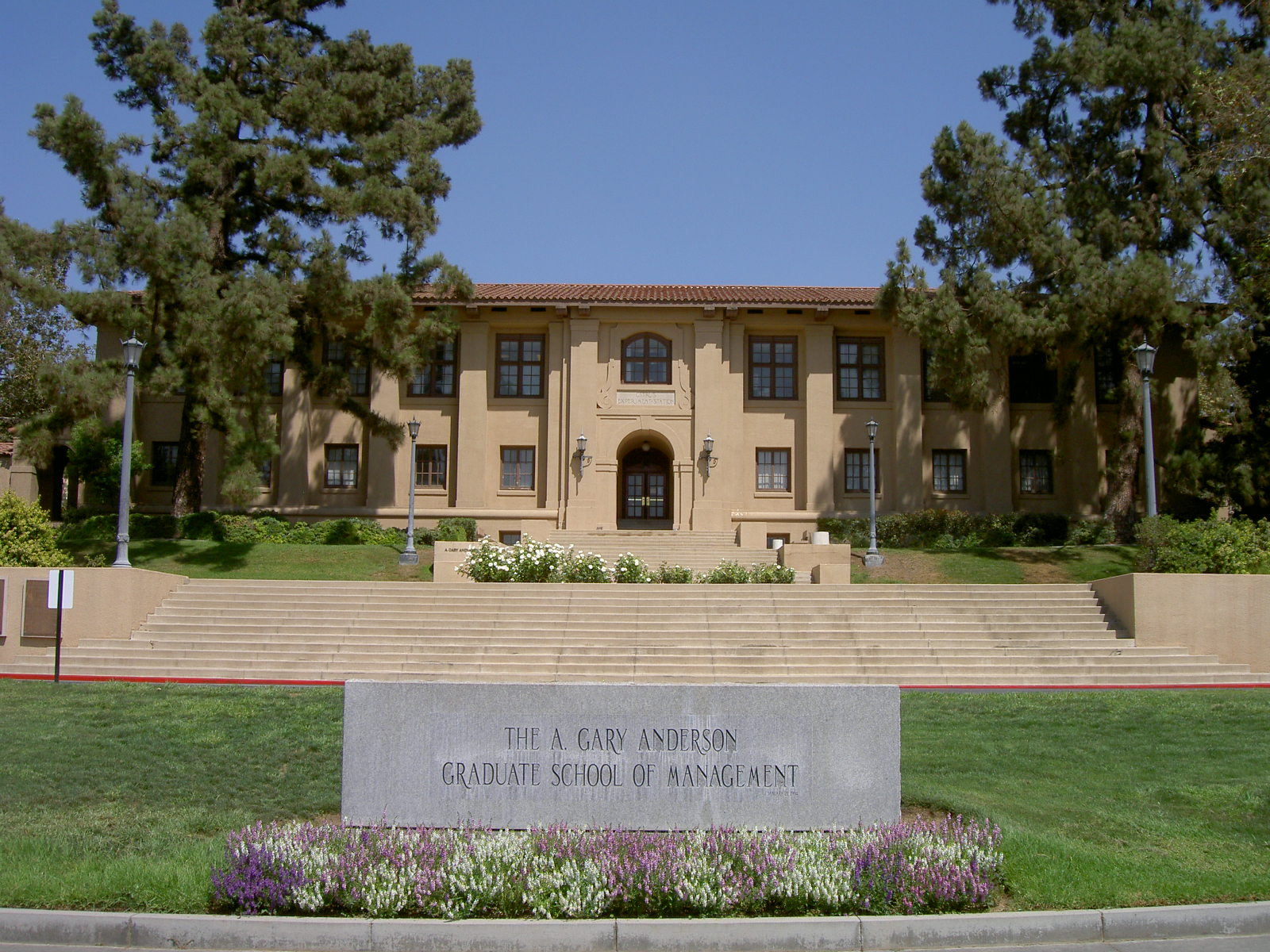
The original UC Citrus Experiment Station, which now houses the A. Gary Anderson Graduate School of Management at the UCR School of Business

At the turn of the 20th century, Southern California was a major producer of citrus, the region's primary agricultural export. The industry developed from the country's first navel orange trees, planted in Riverside in 1873. Lobbied by the citrus industry, the UC Regents established the UC Citrus Experiment Station (CES) on February 14, 1907, on 23 acres (9 ha) of land on the east slope of Mount Rubidoux in Riverside. The station conducted experiments in fertilization, irrigation and crop improvement. In 1917, the station was moved to a larger site, 475 acres (192 ha) near Box Springs Mountain.

The 1944 passage of the GI Bill during World War II set in motion a rise in college enrollments that necessitated an expansion of the state university system in California. A local group of citrus growers and civic leaders, including many UC Berkeley alumni, lobbied aggressively for a UC-administered liberal arts college next to the CES. State Senator Nelson S. Dilworth authored Senate Bill 512 (1949) which former Assemblyman Philip L. Boyd and Assemblyman John Babbage (both of Riverside) were instrumental in shepherding through the State Legislature. Governor Earl Warren signed the bill in 1949, allocating $2 million for initial campus construction.

Gordon S. Watkins, dean of the UCLA College of Letters and Science, became the first provost of the new college at Riverside. Initially conceived of as a small college devoted to the liberal arts, he ordered the campus built for a maximum of 1,500 students and recruited many young junior faculty to fill teaching positions. He presided at its opening with 65 faculty and 127 students on February 14, 1954, remarking, "Never have so few been taught by so many."

UCR's enrollment exceeded 1,000 students by the time Clark Kerr became president of the UC system in 1958. Anticipating a "tidal wave" in enrollment growth required by the baby boom generation, Kerr developed the California Master Plan for Higher Education and the regents designated Riverside a general university campus in 1959. UCR's first chancellor, Herman Theodore Spieth, oversaw the beginnings of the school's transition to a full university and its expansion to a capacity of 5,000 students. UCR's second chancellor, Ivan Hinderaker led the campus through the era of the free speech movement and kept student protests peaceful in Riverside. According to a 1998 interview with Hinderaker, the city of Riverside received negative press coverage for smog after the mayor asked Governor Ronald Reagan to declare the South Coast Air Basin a disaster area in 1971; subsequent student enrollment declined by up to 25% through 1979. Hinderaker's development of innovative programs in business administration and biomedical sciences created incentive for enough students to enroll at Riverside to keep the campus open.

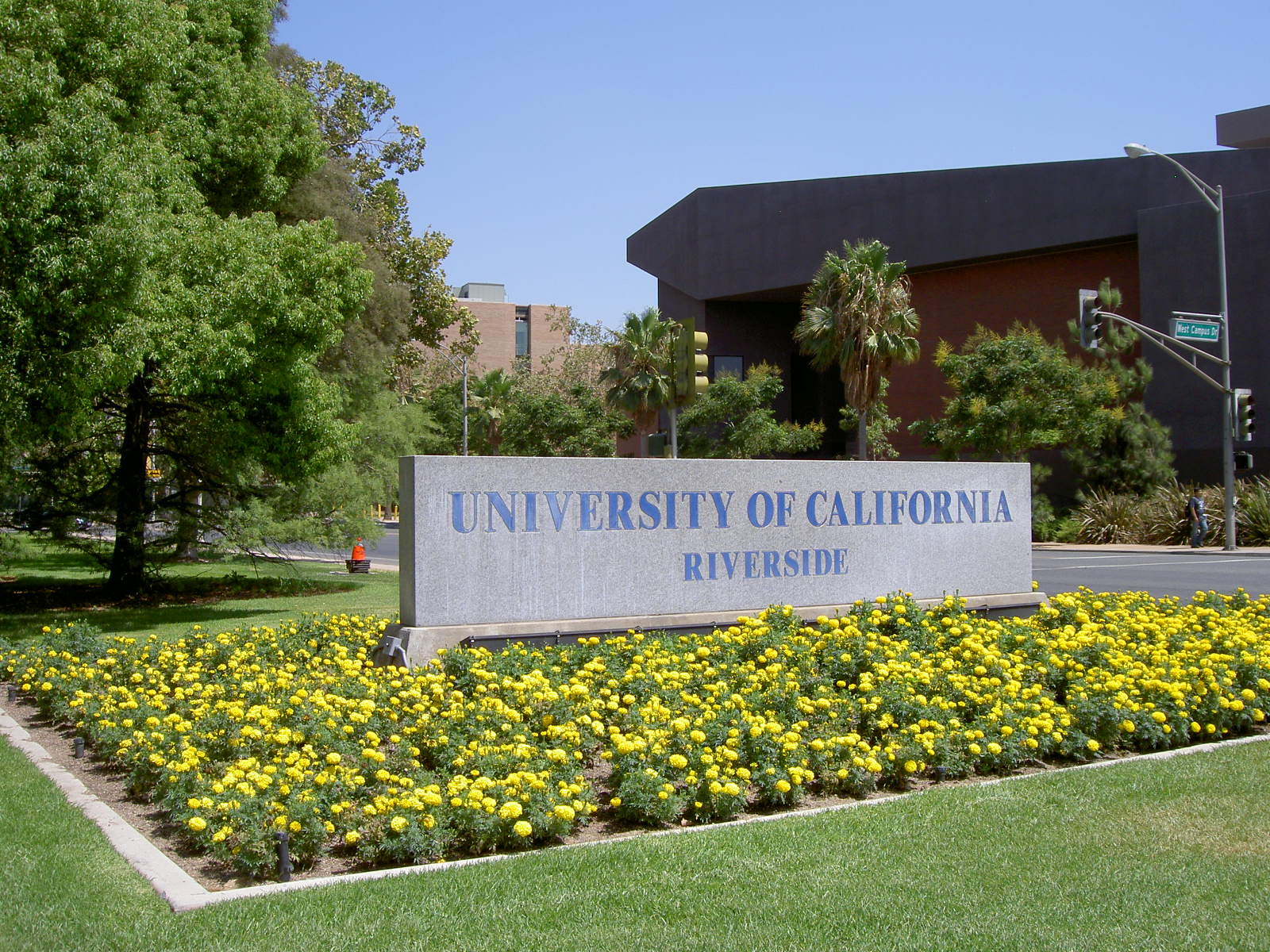
Entrance along University Avenue. The Arts Building is visible in the background (2007).

In the 1990s, UC experienced a new surge of enrollment applications, now known as "Tidal Wave II". The regents targeted UCR for an annual growth rate of 6.3%, the fastest in the UC system, and anticipated 19,900 students at UCR by 2010. By 1995, African American, American Indian, and Latino student enrollments accounted for 30% of the UCR student body, the highest proportion of any UC campus at the time. The 1997 implementation of Proposition 209—which banned the use of affirmative action by state agencies—reduced the ethnic diversity at the more selective UC campuses but further increased it at UCR.

With UCR scheduled for dramatic population growth, efforts have been made to increase its popular and academic recognition. The students voted for a fee increase to move UCR athletics into NCAA Division I standing in 1998. In the 1990s, proposals were made to establish a law school, a medical school, and a school of public policy at UCR, with the UCR School of Medicine and the School of Public Policy becoming reality in 2012. In June 2006, UCR received its largest gift, 15.5 million from two local couples, in trust towards building its medical school. The regents formally approved UCR's medical school proposal in 2006. Upon its completion in 2013, it was the first new medical school built in California in 40 years.

== Campus ==
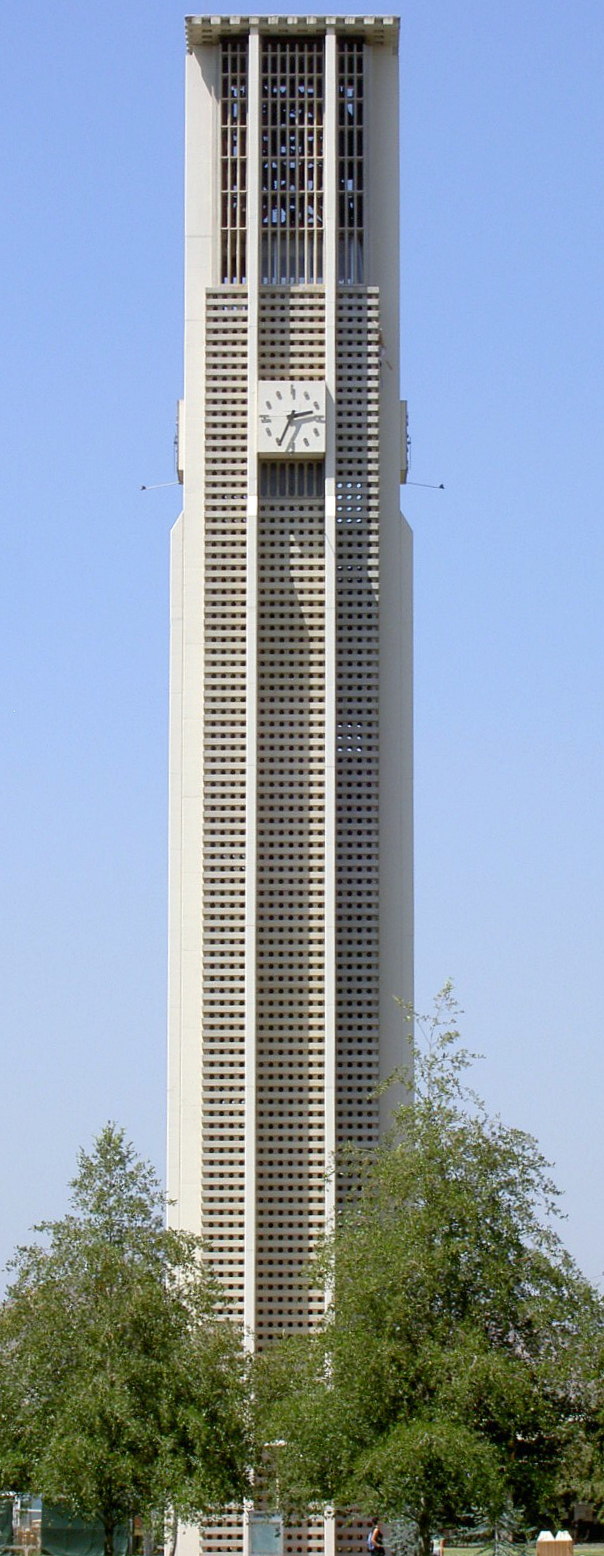
The Carillon Bell Tower is the dominant landmark in the center of the main campus.

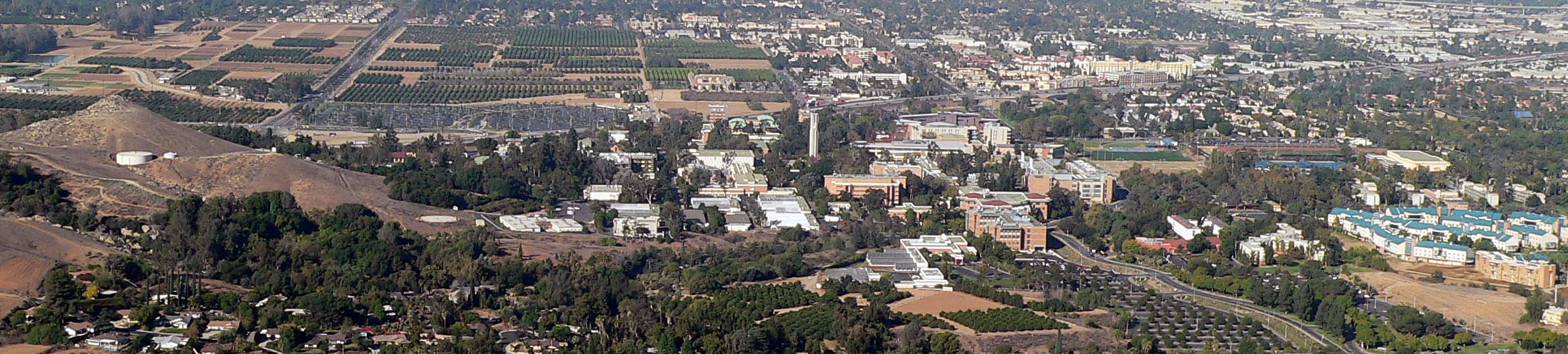
Panoramic view of campus from the Box Springs Mountains (north to the right). Student housing is to the far lower right, west of which are the athletic facilities. The dense vegetation to the lower left constitutes the Botanic Gardens. The agricultural fields in the central left are designated for future campus development (2007).

UCR's main campus sits at an elevation of 1,100 ft (340 m) to 1,450 ft (440 m) near Box Springs Mountain, 3 miles (5 km) east of downtown Riverside, 3 miles (5 km) south of neighboring Highgrove, CA, and comprises 1,112 acres (450 ha) divided into eastern and western areas by the State Route 60 freeway.

East Campus, occupying approximately 600 acres (243 ha), hosts the core cluster of academic buildings and services. The original buildings that formed the earliest kernel of the campus included the UC Citrus Experiment Station, residential buildings, and barn, all of which are still in use. They were designed by Lester H. Hibbard, in association with H.B. Cody. Built by 1917 at a cost of $165,000, the architecture of the major buildings followed the Mission Revival style suggesting the Spanish colonial heritage of Southern California.

Further major construction largely ceased on the site until the groundbreaking for the College of Humanities Arts and Social Sciences (CHASS) in April 1951. A group of five buildings designed by different architects in a decidedly more Modern style were completed by 1954: the Rivera Library, Webber Hall, Geology Building, Physical Education Building and Watkins Hall. After the Regents declared UCR a "general campus" of the UC system in 1958, many new buildings and additions were laid out over the following decade. Following an east–west axis, new student residence halls and athletic facilities were developed along the southeastern quadrant of the main campus, while academic and research facilities were built along the central campus area closer to the freeway. The Bell Tower, one of only five carillons in California, was built in this period. Designed by A. Quincy Jones, the tower is 161 ft (49 m) tall and contains 48 bells, each weighing from 28 pounds (13 kg) to 5,091 pounds (2,309 kg), covering four chromatic octaves.

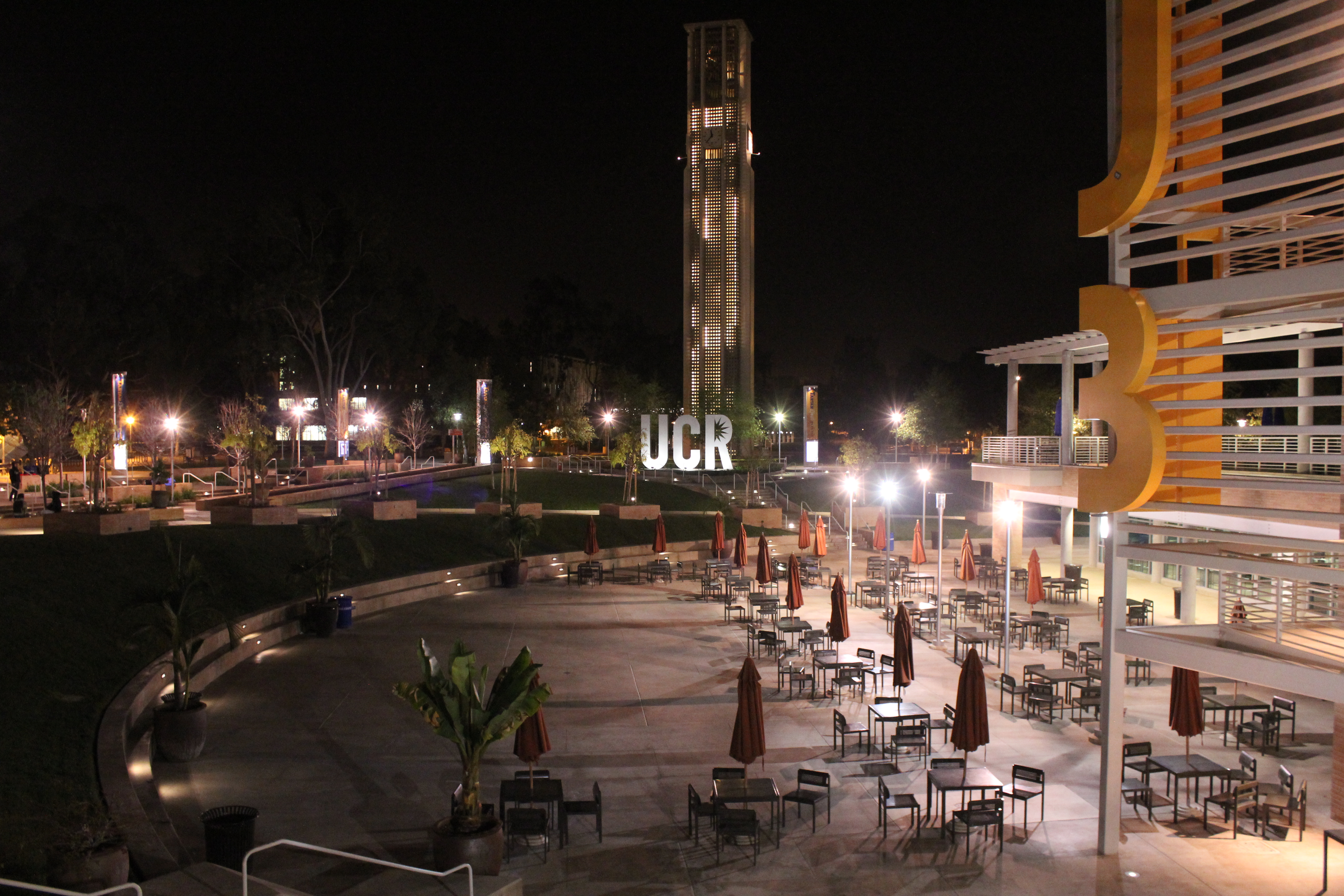
The UCR Bell Tower area viewed at night

After the drop in enrollment and subsequent restructuring of academic programs in the 1970s, little capacity construction was undertaken over the next two decades. However, enrollment growth in the late 1980s justified considerable further campus expansion over the 1990s. Major additions built in the period include: Bourns Hall, completed in 1995; the Humanities & Social Science building, completed in 1996; and the Science Library, completed in 1998. The Pentland and Stonehaven residence halls were completed in 2000, and the Arts building was completed in 2001. Active construction projects include the "Multidisciplinary Research Building," new residence halls located east of A-I and ongoing renovations to Pierce Hall. The first phase of a new Commons was completed in 2007, and phase II is in development. Other ongoing projects include a new CHASS Instructional and Research Center and Students Academic Support Services Building. Since 1999, more than $730 million has been invested in construction projects.

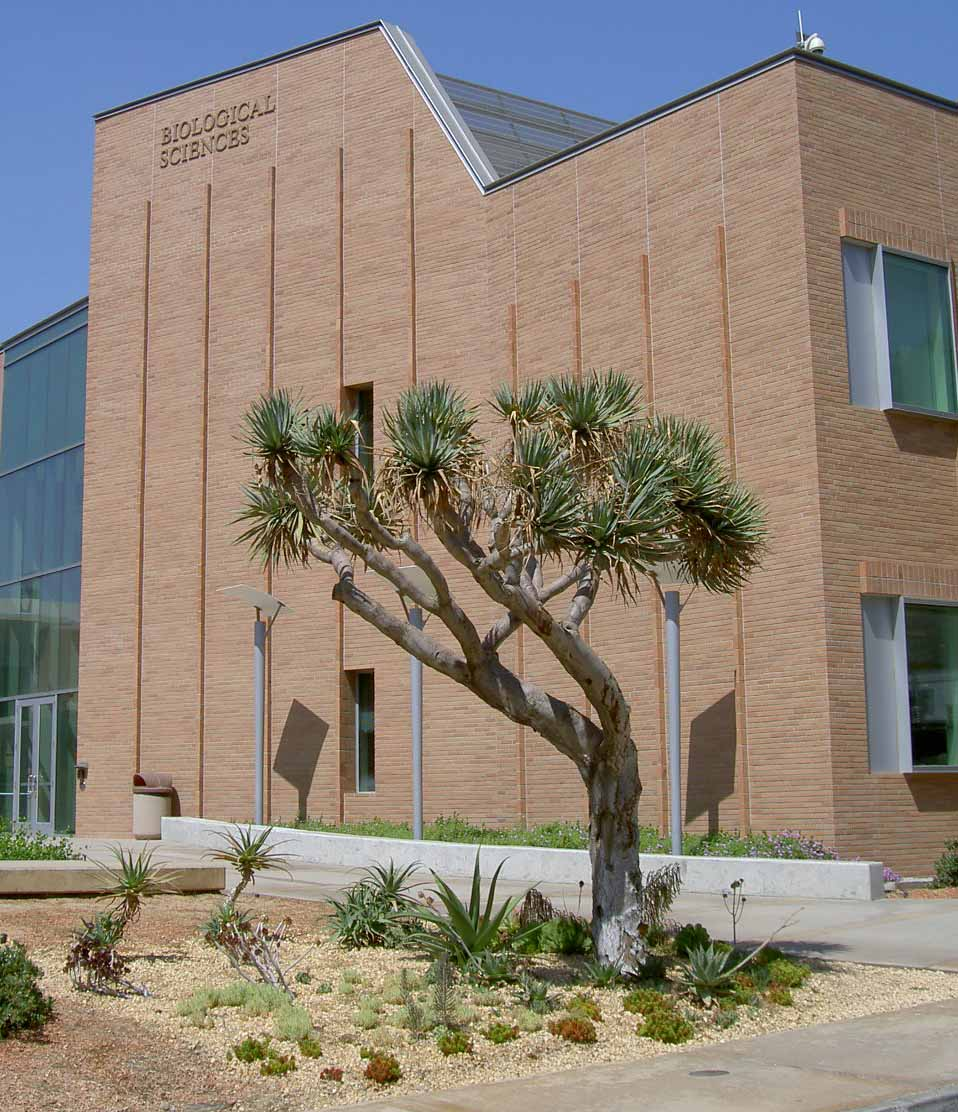
Xeriscaping in front of the Biological Sciences Building on the UCR campus (2007)

Of the 511 acres (207 ha) of UCR property constituting West Campus, approximately 216 acres (87 ha) along University Avenue have been developed. These include facilities such as University Extension, the United States Department of Agriculture (USDA) Germplasm Repository, International Village (student housing), Human Resources and Highlander Hall. University Village, a mixed use commercial development, features a movie theater, stores, restaurants, office space, and an apartment complex, along with a parking structure and surface parking. Citrus groves and row crops occupy the remaining 295 acres (119 ha) stretching northwest to the intersection of Chicago Avenue and Le Conte Drive. Plans for future expansion include converting a portion of these fields into new UCR infrastructure.

The University of California, Riverside has recently united its three downtown arts presentation venues under the umbrella name of the UCR ARTSblock. The ARTSblock is composed of the UCR/California Museum of Photography, The Sweeney Art Gallery, and the Culver Center of the Arts, a media lab and presentation facility. The three institutions reside side by side in the heart of downtown Riverside's historic pedestrian mall.

=== Palm Desert Graduate Center ===
The Richard J. Heckmann International Center for Entrepreneurial Management was founded in Palm Desert in 2001. After the 540-acre (219 ha) Coachella Valley Agricultural Research Station, it is UCR's second institutional presence in the Coachella Valley. Initially by a $6 million gift from Richard J. Heckmann, a water treatment entrepreneur, the institution was planned as a teaching and research center of the A. Gary Anderson Graduate School of Management at the UCR School of Business. The center encourages local entrepreneurship through the Coachella Valley Angel Network, an angel investment network. A further investment of $10 million from the State of California and a donation of 20 acres (8 ha) of land from the City of Palm Desert allowed for the opening of an expanded graduate center on April 15, 2005, adjacent to the California State University, San Bernardino Palm Desert Campus. The center is also home to university researchers in conservation biology, technology transfer and Native American studies. Master's level instruction in business management and creative writing is available at the center.

== Academics ==
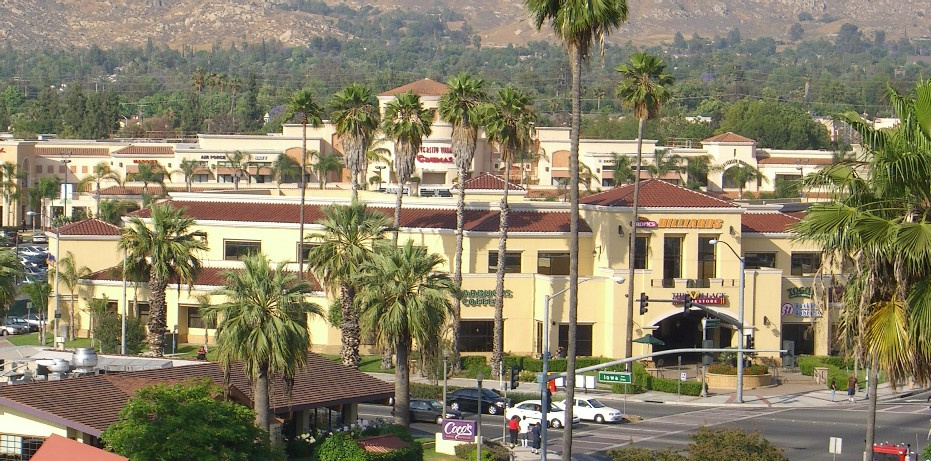
University Village. The movie theater doubles as a classroom during the day.

As a campus of the University of California system, UCR is governed by a Board of Regents and administered by a president. The current president is Michael V. Drake, and the current chancellor of the university is S. Jack Hu. UCR's academic policies are set by its Academic Senate, a legislative body composed of all UCR faculty members.

UCR is organized into three academic colleges, two professional schools, and two graduate schools. UCR's liberal arts college, the College of Humanities, Arts and Social Sciences, was founded in 1954, and began accepting graduate students in 1960. The College of Natural and Agricultural Sciences, founded in 1958, incorporated the CES as part of the first research-oriented institution at UCR; it eventually also incorporated the natural science departments formerly associated with the liberal arts college to form its present structure in 1974. UCR's newest academic unit, the Bourns College of Engineering, was founded in 1989. Comprising the professional schools are the Graduate School of Education, founded in 1968, and the UCR School of Business, founded in 1970. These units collectively provide 81 majors and 52 minors, 48 master's degree programs, and 42 Doctor of Philosophy (PhD) programs. UCR is the only UC campus to offer undergraduate degrees in creative writing and public policy and one of three UCs (along with Berkeley and Irvine) to offer an undergraduate degree in business administration. Through its Division of Biomedical Sciences, founded in 1974, UCR offers the Thomas Haider medical degree program in collaboration with UCLA. UCR's doctoral program in the emerging field of dance theory, founded in 1992, was the first program of its kind in the United States, and UCR's minor in lesbian, gay and bisexual studies, established in 1996, was the first undergraduate program of its kind in the UC system. A new BA program in bagpipes was inaugurated in 2007.

=== Rankings ===
Academic rankings

National
- Forbes: 77
- U.S. News & World Report: 75 (tie)
- Washington Monthly: 50
- WSJ/College Pulse: 57

Global
- ARWU: 201–300
- QS: 440
- THE: 251–300
- U.S. News & World Report: 242

National program rankings
Program	Ranking
Earth Sciences	39
English	46
Political Science	48
Physics	55
Sociology	49
Chemistry	74
Computer Science	56
Economics	57
Psychology	68
Mathematics	66
Biological Sciences	74
Statistics	44
History	54
Education	86
Engineering	83
Medicine: Research	Tier 3
Medicine: Primary Care	Tier 4
Business	90
Public Affairs	76

Global subject rankings
Program	Ranking
Agricultural Sciences	280
Plant & Animal Science	32
Chemistry	171
Computer Science	303
Condensed Matter Physics	171
Geosciences	151
Environment/Ecology	149
Biotechnology & Applied Microbiology	223
Nanoscience & Nanotechnology	200
Engineering	263
Space Science	128
Psychiatry/Psychology	208
Materials Science	339
Mathematics	383
Electrical & Electronic Engineering	256
Molecular Biology & Genetics	222
Physics	156
Biology & Biochemistry	212
Neuroscience & Behavior	466
Social Sciences & Public Health	376
Clinical Medicine	580

Top 10 foreign countries in headcount (Fall 2025)
Country	Headcount
China	752
India	284
Iran	80
Taiwan	77
Bangladesh	70
South Korea	54
Vietnam	38
Mexico	26
Japan	21
Pakistan	16

Institutional rankings of UC Riverside vary widely, depending on the criteria of the publication. For instance, U.S. News & World Report has named UC Riverside the top university in the nation for social mobility 7 years running. In the 2026 edition of U.S. News & World Report's "America's Best Colleges", UCR was ranked tied for 75th among national universities, 36th among public schools, and 1st for social mobility; criteria include professor peer assessment, student selectivity and retention, as well as faculty resources, financial resources, and alumni giving. In the 2026 edition of the Washington Monthly college rankings, UCR ranked 50th among national universities. Washington Monthly assesses the quality of schools based on social mobility (recruiting and graduating low-income students), research (producing cutting-edge scholarship and PhDs), and service (encouraging students to give something back to their country). Since 1997, more than 110 UCR faculty members have been elected fellows of the American Association for the Advancement of Science. Over the course of UCR's history, seven current or former faculty members have been elected to the National Academy of Sciences, and more than 50 have received Guggenheim Fellowships. UCR currently has two Nobel laureates on its faculty.

=== Historical rankings ===
US national
Organization	2026	2025	2024	2023	2022	2021	2020	2019
ARWU	59–78	60–78	62–82	63–85	63–89	66–94	59–66	59–60
Forbes	77	97	75	84	101	-	-	199
Money	4.5/5.0	5.0/5.0	4.5/5.0	40	48	12	32	29
U.S. News & World Report	75	76	76	89	83	88	91	85
Wall Street Journal	57	108	181	184	192	192	189	272
Washington Monthly	50	79	64	69	53	27	27	28

=== Research and economic impact ===
UCR operated under a $727 million budget in fiscal year 2014–15. The state government provided $214 million, student fees accounted for $224 million and $100 million came from contracts and grants. Private support and other sources accounted for the remaining $189 million. Overall, monies spent at UCR have an economic impact of nearly $1 billion in California. UCR research expenditure in FY 2018 totaled $167.8 million. Total research expenditures at Riverside are significantly concentrated in agricultural science, accounting for 53% of total research expenditures spent by the university in 2002. Top research centers by expenditure, as measured in 2002, include the Agricultural Experiment Station, the Center for Environmental Research and Technology, the Center for Bibliographical Studies, the Air Pollution Research Center, and the Institute of Geophysics and Planetary Physics.

Throughout UCR's history, researchers have developed more than 40 new citrus varieties and invented new techniques to help the $960 million-a-year California citrus industry fight pests and diseases. In 1927, entomologists at the CES introduced two wasps from Australia as natural enemies of a major citrus pest, the citrophilus mealybug, saving growers in Orange County $1 million in annual losses. This event was pivotal in establishing biological control as a practical means of reducing pest populations. In 1963, plant physiologist Charles Coggins proved that application of gibberellic acid allows fruit to remain on citrus trees for extended periods. The ultimate result of his work, which continued through the 1980s, was the extension of the citrus-growing season in California from four to nine months. In 1980, UC Riverside released the Oroblanco grapefruit, its first patented citrus variety. Since then, the citrus breeding program has released other varieties such as the Melogold grapefruit, the Gold Nugget mandarin (or tangerine), and others that have yet to be given trademark names.

To assist entrepreneurs in developing new products, UCR is a primary partner in the Riverside Regional Technology Park, which includes the City of Riverside and the County of Riverside. It also administers six reserves of the University of California Natural Reserve System. UCR recently announced a partnership with China Agricultural University to launch a new center in Beijing, which will study ways to respond to the country's growing environmental issues. UCR can also boast the birthplace of two name reactions in organic chemistry, the Castro-Stephens coupling and the Midland Alpine Borane Reduction.

=== Admissions and enrollment ===
Undergraduate admission statistics
	Fall 2025	Fall 2024	Fall 2023	Fall 2022	Fall 2021
First-time Freshmen
Applicants	70,863	58,048	56,943	54,684	52,677
Admits	61,312	44,343	39,758	37,563	34,437
Admit rate	87%	76%	70%	69%	65%
Enrolled	6,682	5,422	5,521	5,573	5,203
Yield rate	11%	12%	14%	15%	15%
Transfers
Applicants	13,744	12,268	12,086	12,937	14,740
Admits	9,245	7,034	6,803	7,877	9,234
Admit rate	67%	57%	56%	61%	63%
Enrolled	1,612	1,271	1,246	1,461	2,056
Yield rate	17%	18%	18%	19%	22%

Admission to UC Riverside is rated as "more selective" by U.S. News & World Report.

For fall 2018, UCR received 49,079 freshmen applications; 24,820 were admitted (50.6%). The average GPA of the enrolled freshmen was 3.83, while the average SAT scores were 620 for reading & writing and 635 for math.

In 2006, 43.4 percent of admitted students were first generation college students, 38.7 percent came from low family income backgrounds, and 24 percent graduated from low-performing high schools as measured by Academic Performance Index (API) scores. In 2007, U.S. News ranked UCR as the third most ethnically diverse and, by the number of undergraduates receiving Pell Grants (42 percent), the 15th most economically diverse student body in the nation.

According to statistics released by the Education Trust, a national nonprofit, in 2005 UC Riverside graduated 65.3 percent of its students in six years, a figure consistent with national averages but behind the average set by the top five public research universities by as much as 22 percent. However, UCR's consistency with the national average is well above the median of 39 percent for low-income-serving institutions as calculated in 2006 by the National Center for Education Statistics, making the campus a model for successful approaches to diversity in higher education.

== Athletics ==
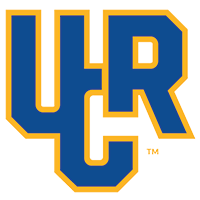
UC Riverside Highlanders Athletics logo, launched in 2020

UCR's varsity teams compete in the Big West Conference of NCAA Division I. Programs include men's and women's soccer, cross country, basketball, track and field, baseball, softball, tennis, golf and women's volleyball. After students voted to assess themselves $35 a quarter to fund the athletic programs in 1998, men's and women's soccer and golf were added, and the athletic department switched from NCAA Division II in 2000. While at Division II level, UCR produced 5 national championship teams in men's baseball and women's volleyball.

As of 2006, UCR had produced 17 individual national champions, 17 All-Americans and many conference and regional champions. The men's golf team represented UCR in the 2004 and 2005 NCAA West Regionals after winning back-to-back Conference Championships in those respective years while having three athletes ranked in the top 100 in the country. In 2006, 2007, and 2010 the UCR women's basketball team represented the conference in the Division I tournament but lost all three times in the first round. In December 2008, the UCR women's basketball team upset the #16-seeded Vanderbilt Commodores.

=== National championship teams (Division II) ===
- Baseball (1977 and 1982)
- Women's volleyball (1977 – AIAW, 1982 and 1986)
- Women's soccer (1983) – first place in the California Collegiate Women's Soccer Conference

== Libraries and collections ==
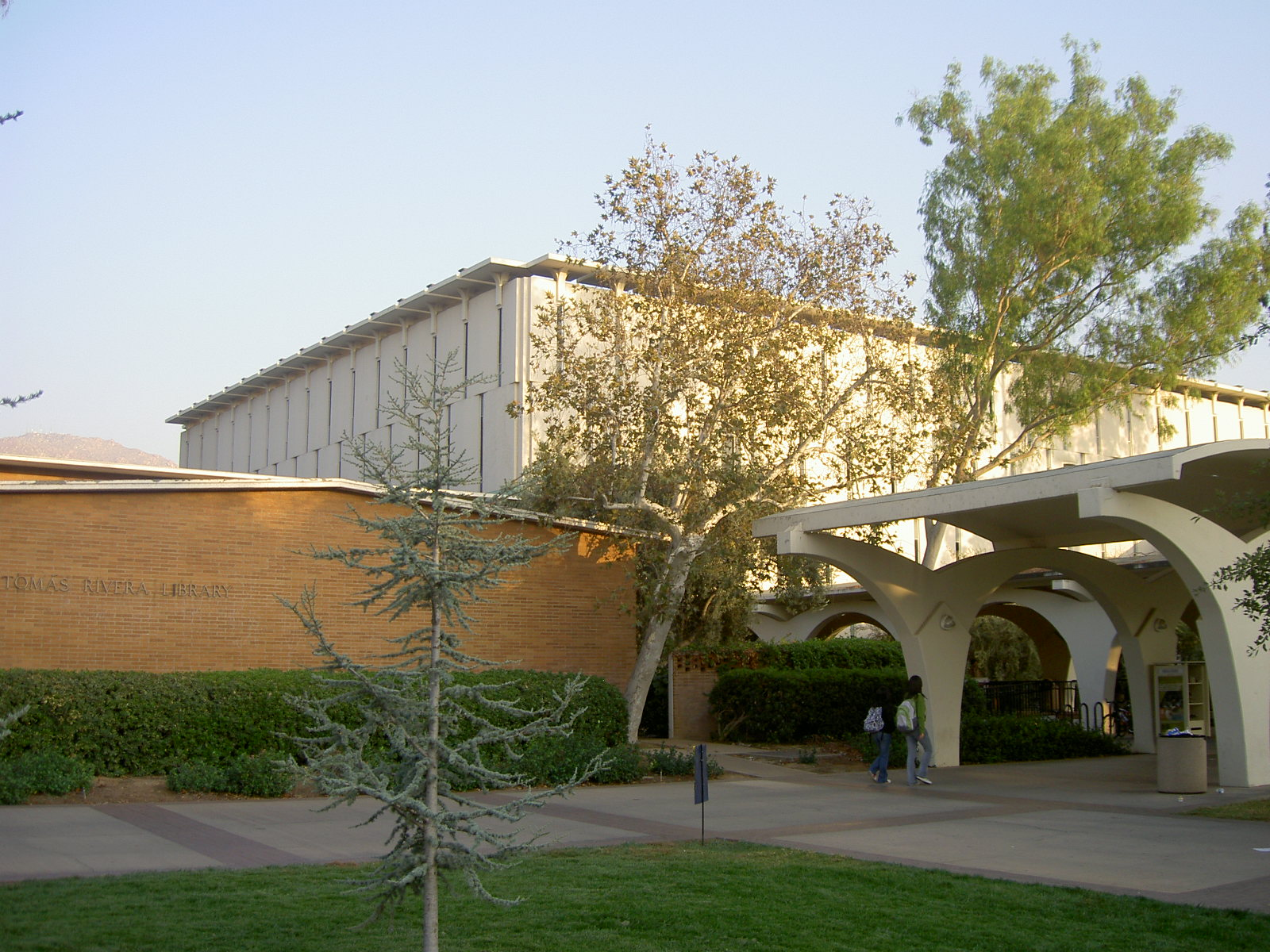
The Tomás Rivera Library (2003)

Raymond L. Orbach Science Library (2007)

Total library collections at UCR comprise more than 2 million volumes, 14,017 electronic journals, 23,000 serial subscriptions, and 1.7 million microformats. Two large, four-story libraries house most of the physical collections. The 179,595 ft (54,741 m) Rivera library was constructed in 1954 and named after Tomás Rivera in 1985. It seats a capacity of 956 and houses general humanities and social science collections, as well as special collections, including the world's largest collection of science fiction, horror and fantasy literature, the 110,000-volume Eaton Collection. The Rivera Library also hosts the only U.S. Patent and Trademark Depository based on a UC campus. The 125,752 ft (38,329 m) Raymond L. Orbach Science Library, built in 1998, seats a capacity of 1,360 and houses 533,000 volumes in the physical, natural, agricultural, biomedical, engineering and computer sciences, with special strengths in the areas of citrus and sub-tropical horticulture, entomology, and arid lands agriculture. On November 3, 2009, the Science library was officially renamed the Raymond L. Orbach Science Library in honor of former chancellor Raymond L. Orbach. Smaller libraries include the Media and Cultural Library, the Music Library, and a branch digital library in Palm Desert. The UCR Library is one of 116 members of the Association of Research Libraries, and is ranked 93rd in this group.

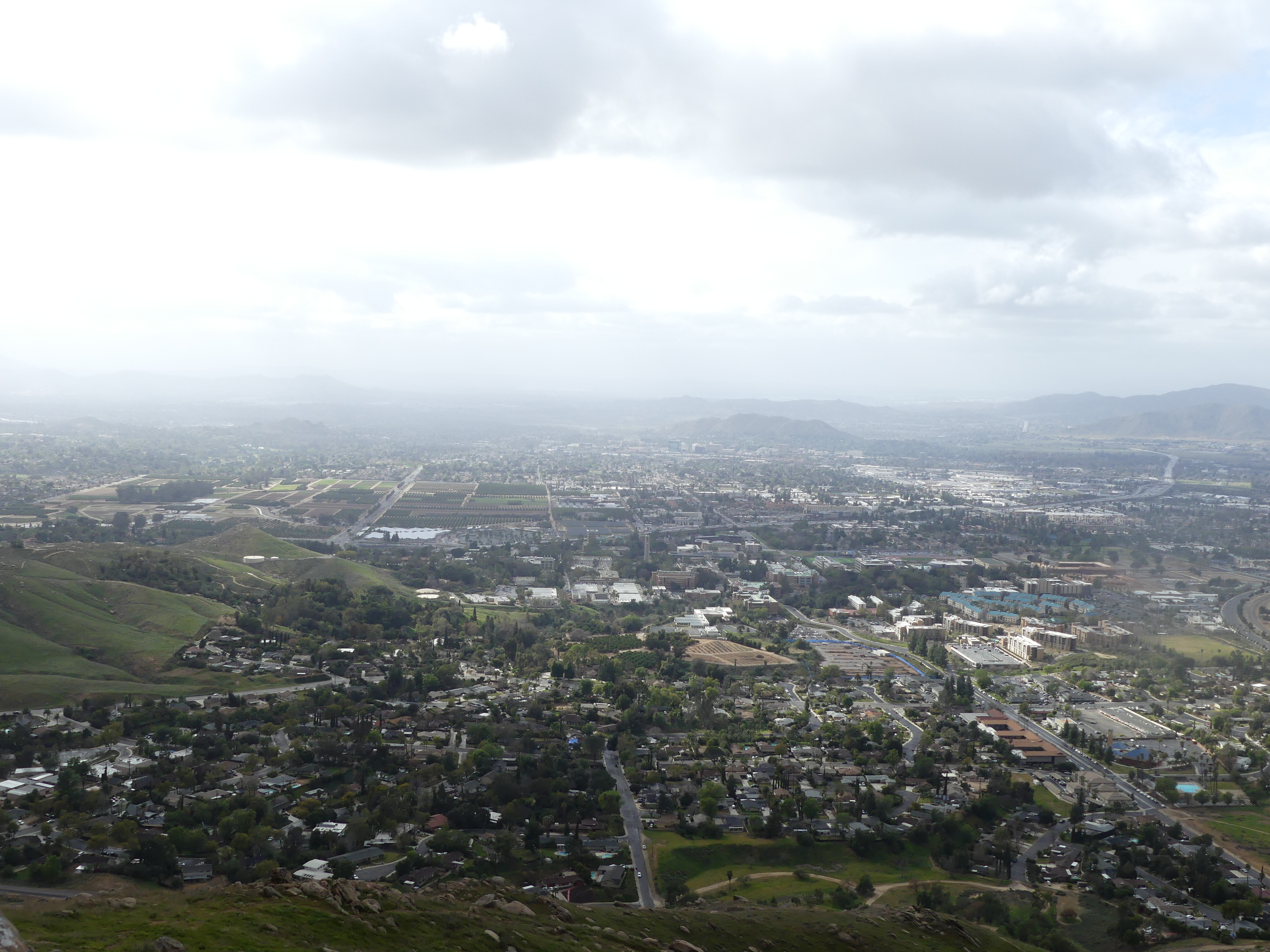
The 40 acres of the UCR Botanic Gardens are visible from Box Spring Mountain.

UCR's academic colleges administer significant museum collections in the arts and sciences. The Citrus Variety Collection constitutes 1,800 trees representing two of each of the 640 types of citrus and 28 other related genera in the family Rutaceae, the largest such collection in the world. The Herbarium houses more than 110,000 dried plant specimens from across the Western hemisphere. UCR is also home to 40 acres (16 ha) of botanical gardens containing more than 3,500 plant species from around the world. The Gardens are located in the eastern foothills of the Box Springs Mountain on the University of California, Riverside campus. Over four miles (6 km) of trails wind through many microclimates and hilly terrain.

The Entomology Research Museum contains more than four million insect specimens, with particular strengths in Hymenoptera, Chalcidoidea, Aphelinidae, Thysanoptera and Meloidae. The UCR/California Museum of Photography and Sweeney Art Gallery house UCR's primary art collections. The UCR/CMP includes the world's largest holding of vintage stereographs, one of the three great public collections of photographic apparatus in the US, and the University Print Collection of contemporary and historical images by over 1000 photographers. Located adjacent to the UCR/CMP, the Sweeney Art Gallery holds approximately 650 unique works, with especially strong collections from the modern to contemporary periods, including pieces by Alexander Calder, Roy Lichtenstein, Millard Sheets and Kara Walker.

== Student life ==
Undergraduate demographics as of Fall 2024
Race and ethnicity	Total
Hispanic	40.0%
Asian	35.9%
White	10.3%
Two or more races	5.0%
Black	3.5%
International	3.4%
Unknown	1.5%
Native American	0.1%
Native Hawaiian/Pacific Islander	0.1%
Economic diversity
Affluent (Note: The percentage of students who are a part of the American middle class at the bare minimum.)	52%
Low-income (Note: The percentage of students who received an income-based federal Pell grant intended for low-income students.)	48%

Riverside enrolls the highest percentage of African American students of any of the 10 UC campuses and the second highest percentage of Latino students after Merced, prompting the Los Angeles Times and New York Times to run stories stating that UCR is a "campus of choice" for minority students. UCR was the first college in California to open a staffed lesbian, gay, bisexual and transgender (LGBT) resource center in 1993; the first UC campus to offer an LGBT minor studies program in 1996; and the first campus in the nation to offer a gender-neutral housing option in 2005. In recognition of this, The Advocate recognized UCR as one of the nation's best campuses for LGBT students in 2006, although it did not make the top 20. The Princeton Review listed UCR as a "Best Western College."

=== Housing ===
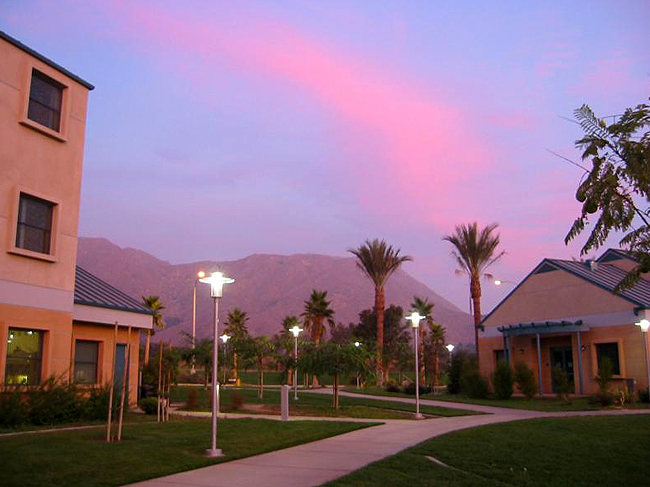
The Box Springs Mountains at dusk from the Pentland Hills residence hall

UCR's residence halls consist of four structures—Aberdeen-Inverness, Dundee, Lothian, and Pentland Hills—which can house over 3,000 students in single, double, and triple rooms. In addition, UCR features several on-campus apartment complexes such as Stonehaven, Bannockburn Village, University Plaza, Falkirk, Oban, Glen Mor and International Village, which together house 959 students. Oban has since been upgraded to accommodate family housing following the demolition of Canyon Crest. Glen Mor, an apartment housing complex adjacent to Pentland Hills, was opened in 2007, and the university also purchased a nearby apartment complex, which is now known as Falkirk, for student housing in 2007. About half of the student population lives in off-campus apartments, one-fourth commute, and one-fourth live on campus. Thirty percent of students remain on campus for the weekend.

Reflecting UCR's diversity, a number of residence halls have been established for specific social, cultural and academic needs. Ethnic and gender-oriented theme halls include Unete a Mundo, for students seeking to support Latino or Chicano students in acclimating to life at UCR; a Pan African Theme Hall for students interested in developing consciousness of African culture in relation to other cultures of the world; and Stonewall Hall, dedicated to students of all gender identities and sexual orientations who wish to live in a gender-neutral community. UCR's three academic colleges in the humanities, sciences and engineering fields are represented by respective theme halls, and halls exist for honor students and transfer students.

In Fall 2018, UCR began construction of a new residence hall and dining facility in the parking lot behind Aberdeen-Inverness. This new residence hall and dining facility opened as Dundee-Glasgow in 2020, and features UCR's first two-story residential restaurant.

=== Student organizations and activities ===
UCR hosts over 500 registered student organizations, including the Associated Students of the University of California, Riverside (ASUCR), which represents undergraduates on administrative and policy issues. ASUCR is guided by a Senate composed of 19 elected senators, who represent the undergraduate colleges in proportion to their enrollment, 7 Executive Cabinet Officers, and directors, who are in charge of the various parts of ASUCR, and a Judicial Council6, which adjudicates any cases involving personnel misconduct or interpretation of the constitution. Membership is composed of all UCR students who pay mandatory activity fees. ASUCR assesses these fees and distributes funds to registered student groups on campus, including student lobbying groups, a right that ASUCR won in a federal court case against the regents in 1999.

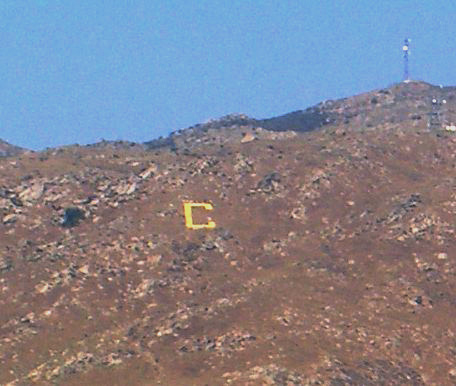
In August 1955, students constructed a 132 ft (40 m) by 70 ft (21 m) concrete "C" on the western slope of the Box Springs Mountain.

Of the registered student groups, 40 are fraternities and sororities. Nine men's fraternities belong to the North American Interfraternity Conference; seven women's sororities belong to the National Panhellenic Conference; seven men's fraternities and ten women's sororities represent the National Multicultural Greek Council, and two others fall under the campus Raza Assembly and are unique to UCR. Thirteen percent of the undergraduate student body participates in Greek life, although chapter houses are not permitted. Including the Greek letter organizations, more than 60 student volunteer service organizations at UCR contribute to more than 100,000 hours of collective and individual service done in the community each year. Jewish student life has existed for over a decade through UCR Hillel.

Student media organizations include The Highlander student newspaper, currently published every Tuesday during the academic year. First published in 1954, The Highlander remains an independent student media outlet. It was an entirely self-funded organization until 2001, when ASUCR passed a funding referendum for it. Student fees from the referendum go towards overhead and printing costs, however The Highlander is primarily funded through its own advertising revenue. In 2003, The Highlander published a comic depicting a stereotypical Asian American graduate teaching assistant with poor English skills, inciting community backlash and prompting an apology from Editor-in-Chief Kahlil Ford. Other student news publications on campus include the Asian Community Times, Indian Time, Nuestra Cosa, Queeriosity, and the X-Factor Student Newspaper. Campus literary magazines include Mosaic, published at UCR since 1959, and Crate, published by graduate students in UCR's master's level creative writing program since 2005. UCR broadcasts over radio as KUCR at 88.3 FM. The station programs a variety of independent music, news and commentary.

On-campus entertainment events are planned by a 14-member Associated Students Program Board (ASPB), comprising six student-run divisions that include concerts, films and lectures, cultural events and special events, as well as a marketing and leadership division. ASPB's major events include the Block Party Concert, Winter Soulstice, Homecoming Bonfire and Spring Splash.

The Graduate Student Association of the University of California, Riverside (GSAUCR) is ASUCR's counterpart on the graduate level. It is guided by a Graduate Student Council consisting of representatives from every department on campus. GSAUCR assesses fees required of all graduate students and uses them to fund research awards and colloquiums, conference travel grants, and speaker funds.

== Notable people ==
=== Alumni ===
More than 94,000 alumni have graduated from UCR over the course of its history. A 13,865-square-foot (1,288.1 m^{2}) Alumni and Visitors Center was established in 2007. It is used as a central gathering place for alumni and holds several facilities for use including meeting rooms, a formal board room, a central lobby area, a library, several alumni affairs offices, and a café.

Some of the most notable alumni include:

- Daniel Aguirre – professional soccer player for Liga MX club Guadalajara
- Steve Breen – editorial cartoonist and two-time Pulitzer Prize winner (1998 and 2009)
- Joanna Cameron – actress and model, The Secrets of Isis
- Laurent Charlet – geochemist and professor at the University of Grenoble-Alpes
- Billy Collins – author, 11th U.S. Poet Laureate
- Sherilyn Peace Garnett – federal judge for the United States District Court for the Central District of California, since 2023
- David Gilbert – photographer
- Joe Kelly – professional baseball player
- Brenda Martinez – ran track & field for UCR and later represented the United States in the 2016 Rio de Janeiro Olympics for the 1500 meter track event
- Anil Raj – former Amnesty International board member and UNDP aid worker; killed in a terror attack in Kabul in November 2019
- Richard R. Schrock – physicist, Nobel Prize in Chemistry laureate
- Judy Shapiro-Ikenberry – long-distance runner
- Tim D. White – paleoanthropologist, one of Time magazine's "100 Most Influential People of 2010" for his work with Lucy, one of the oldest known Hominin
- Charles E. Young – UCR's first student body president, later chancellor of UCLA

=== Faculty ===
Some of the most notable faculty members include:

- Chris Abani – author, member of the American Academy of Arts and Sciences
- Reza Aslan – author, researcher, member of the Council on Foreign Relations
- Steven G. Axelrod – writer, son of George Axelrod and stepbrother of Jonathan Axelrod
- John C. Baez – physicist, researcher focused on loop quantum gravity
- Barry Barish – physicist, Nobel Prize in Physics laureate
- Carl F. Cranor – philosopher and writer, fellow of the American Association for the Advancement of Science
- Mike Davis – historian, MacArthur Fellows Program recipient
- Edwin Gaustad – historian, president of the American Society of Church History
- Gail Hanson – physicist, Panofsky Prize recipient and fellow of the American Physical Society
- Nalo Hopkinson – author, World Fantasy Award recipient
- Peter E. Kaus – physicist, son of Gina Kaus and the brother of Otto Kaus
- Laila Lalami – author, American Book Awards recipient
- Sonja Lyubomirsky – psychologist, author of the bestseller The How of Happiness: A Scientific Approach to Getting the Life You Want
- William H. Okamura – chemist, fellow of the American Association for the Advancement of Science
- Dylan Rodríguez – Ethnic studies scholar, first distinguished professor in the department of Black studies
- Robert Rosenthal – psychologist, Guggenheim Fellowship recipient
- Richard R. Schrock – chemist, Nobel Prize in Chemistry laureate
- Jane Smiley – author, Pulitzer Prize recipient
- Susan Straight – author, Edgar Award recipient, MacArthur Fellows Program recipient, Kirsch Award for Lifetime Achievement from the Los Angeles Times Book Prize
- Karl Taube – archeologist, researcher focused on pre-Columbian civilization
- Michael R. Zachariah – Distinguished Professor of Chemical Engineering and Materials Science

== See also ==
- University of California Students Association
- Katherine Siva Saubel – Cahuilla people leader and scholar, received the Chancellor's Medal from UCR
