= History of the University of California, Riverside =

The history of the University of California, Riverside, or UCR, started in 1907 when UCR was the University's Citrus Experiment Station. By the 1950s, the University had established a teaching-focused liberal arts curriculum at the site, in the spirit of a small liberal arts college, but California's rapidly growing population made it necessary for the Riverside campus to become a full-fledged general campus of the UC system, and it was so designated in 1959.

== The University of California Citrus Experiment Station ==
=== The Rubidoux Laboratory ===
The Southern California "citrus belt" first emerged in the 1870s, and within two decades stretched eastward from Pasadena to Redlands beneath the foothills of the San Gabriel and San Bernardino mountains. It originated from experimental navel orange plantings first conducted in Riverside, from cuttings introduced from Brazil. John Henry Reed, a retired school superintendent and dry goods merchant from Ohio turned citrus grower, is credited with first proposing the establishment of a scientific experiment station specifically for citrus research in Southern California, and organized a vigorous lobbying effort of the local citrus industry towards that end. As founding member and chair of the Riverside Horticultural Club's experimental committee, he also pioneered a collaborative approach to conducting experimental plantings, and published more than 150 semitechnical and popular papers on citrus and other subjects between 1895 and 1915.

Riverside California State Assembly member Miguel Estudillo worked with Reed and a committee of the Riverside Chamber of Commerce to draft Assembly Bill 552, which provided for a pathological laboratory and branch experiment station in Southern California. On March 18, 1905, a legislative board of commissioners was appropriated $30,000 to select the site and implement the measure. On February 14, 1907, the University of California Board of Regents established the UC Citrus Experiment Station on 23 acres (93,000 m^{2}) of land on the east slope of Mt. Rubidoux in Riverside. However, the University's decision to concentrate on the development of the University Farm in Davis led to only two initial staff being assigned to the CES, only one of whom, Ralph E. Smith, a plant pathologist from Berkeley, was a scientist. Dubbed the Rubidoux Laboratory, the initial purpose of the station was to concentrate on various soil management problems such as fertilization, irrigation, improvement of crops.

=== Expansion and relocation to Box Springs ===
In 1913, a record killing freeze in Southern California caused a panic throughout the $175 million citrus industry, which demanded more state-funded agricultural research. Three acts of the California Legislature in 1913 provided $185,000 to fund an enlarged CES to be located in one of the eight southern counties. Developers of the San Fernando Valley, recently opened for settlement by the 1914 completion of the Owens Valley aqueduct, lobbied intensively for the CES to be relocated there.

Herbert John Webber, a professor of plant breeding from Cornell University and newly appointed director of the Citrus Experiment Station, considered various site proposals but ultimately worked with the Riverside Chamber of Commerce, city officials, and local growers to assist in drafting and endorsing a proposal for the CES to be relocated to its current site on 475 acres (1.92 km^{2}) of land 2.5 miles (4.0 km) from downtown Riverside, adjacent to the Box Springs Mountains. On December 14, 1914 the UC Regents approved the selection, news of which caused jubilation in downtown Riverside: "The entire city turned into the streets, the steam whistle on the electrical plant blew for 15 minutes, and the Mission Inn bells were rung in celebration." It was, according to Reed as quoted in the Riverside Daily Press: "...the most important day that has occurred in all the history of Riverside."

The new station was to be governed autonomously under Webber's direction. He spent the next few years personally recruiting the founding research team, eleven scientists organized into six divisions of agricultural chemistry, plant physiology, plant pathology, entomology, plant breeding, and orchard management. Webber also initiated the development of the Citrus Variety Collection on five acres (20,000 m^{2}) planted with approximately 500 species of citrus from around the world, which grew to become the greatest such variety collection internationally. He also planted hundreds of other subtropical crops, including 70 varieties of avocado, imported from Mexico, that produced more than 45,000 hybrids through controlled pollination. (He also helped found the California Avocado Association in 1914 and served as its president for two years, and organized the annual citrus institute of the National Orange Show in San Bernardino and the Date Growers Institute of Coachella Valley.)

=== Early architecture ===
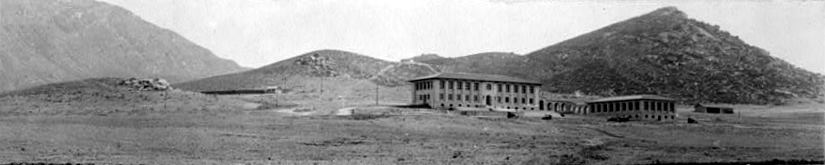
Citrus Experiment Station, circa 1916

The original laboratory, farm, and residence buildings on the Box Springs site was designed by Lester H. Hibbard of Los Angeles, a graduate of the University of California School of Architecture, in association with a colleague, H.B. Cody. Built at a cost of $165,000, the architecture followed the Mission Revival style suggesting the Spanish colonial heritage of Southern California. The site, which became the early nucleus of the UCR campus, eventually opened in 1917, although the Division of Agricultural Chemistry continued to occupy lab space at the Rubidoux site.

== The early years ==
After the 1945 passage of the GI Bill, a massive influx of former servicemen began to enter college and strained the capacities of many state university systems throughout the United States. While this wave was expected to eventually subside by the early 1950s, state and federal studies released in the late 1940s all projected massive demand for access to higher education in California in the near future. The UC system was then composed only of established campuses at Berkeley and Los Angeles which were already operating near capacity. Davis was then still a primarily agricultural campus, while Santa Barbara State had just entered the UC system in 1944.

In 1947, the Board of Regents and an Education Committee of the State Legislature appointed a committee to conduct a large-scale study of California's needs which was dubbed the Strayer Committee (after its chair, George D. Strayer, professor emeritus of Teachers College, Columbia University). As the Strayer Committee was empowered to make recommendations regarding the establishment of any new state campuses, a group of Riverside citrus growers and civic leaders, including many Cal (Berkeley) alumni, formed the Citizens University Committee (CUC) to lobby for a small liberal arts college attached to the UC Citrus Experiment Station. After diligent lobbying by the CUC, which sent gifts of oranges and grapefruit to every member of the Legislature, the Strayer Committee recommended that Riverside become the location for the fourth UC undergraduate campus. (It also recommended that the existing College of Agriculture at Davis be expanded to serve other kinds of undergraduates besides agriculture students.) Riverside State Assemblyman John Babbage drafted Senate Bill 512, which allocated $6 million for the construction of the new college. Governor Earl Warren signed the bill approving the establishment of the College of Letters and Science in Riverside in 1949, after reducing its initial allocation for construction to $4 million.

That same year, the Regents appointed a 13-member faculty committee to plan the expansion of the existing campuses at Davis and Riverside, headed by Harry B. Walker of the College of Agriculture at Davis. Though it was decided that the new college at Riverside would be a separate institution from the CES, with no undergraduate work in agriculture planned, it was also decided that the Riverside provost would report to the president of the UC through the Vice-president of the statewide College of Agriculture, to whom the director of the CES also reported. Gordon S. Watkins, then dean of the College of Letters and Science at UCLA, was a member of this initial planning committee, and UC President Robert Gordon Sproul requested him to oversee the organization of the College of Letters and Science at Riverside. Watkins accepted the job and started five years of planning, faculty recruitment, and building construction. The onset of the Korean War delayed construction, and the CUC continued to lobby for basic resources such as steel and concrete to build the new campus. Anticipating an initial enrollment of 1,000, Watkins ordered the initial campus built for a maximum capacity of 1,500 students. Not anticipating the need for graduate work, Watkins focused on recruiting many young, new Ph.D.s into junior faculty positions, rather than already established researchers. He became provost of the Riverside campus and presided at its opening with 65 faculty and 131 students in February 1954, remarking "Never have so few been taught by so many."

Under Watkins, Riverside got off to a most auspicious start. Watkins was able to attract many excellent faculty members to Riverside with good pay, a relatively light teaching load, and no obligation to conduct research. The Claremont Colleges were particularly frustrated at their new public competitor, especially when Watkins recruited W. Conway Pierce from Pomona College to serve as Riverside's first dean of physical sciences. In turn, Riverside's high-quality faculty combined with low tuition meant that during the 1950s, Riverside briefly led all UC locations (including Berkeley) in terms of the quality of its incoming freshmen classes, and it was the only public college listed on a 1956 ranking of the 10 best liberal arts colleges in the United States. Among the most brilliant of Riverside's early students was Charles E. Young, who would go on to become UCLA's longest-serving chancellor.

=== Mascot history ===
The original UCR logo

When the university opened in February 1954, many students wanted a bear symbol in keeping with the traditional ursine mascots at UC Berkeley and UCLA. The founding editors initially named the student newspaper "The Cub", and out of a total of 67 names entered in a contest to pick the mascot, "Cubs" was the most popular; however, many felt that this name would permanently denigrate the campus as a "little brother" of UCLA and Berkeley. In November 1954, the men's basketball team championed freshman Donna Lewis' suggestion of "Hylanders" as a write-in candidate in a run-off between "Cubs" and "Grizzlies." The corrected name won easily, as Provost Watkins was noted for speaking with a Welsh accent, and the UCR campus was located at the highest elevation among all UC schools. Also, the Box Springs Mountains were known as the Highlands.

== The Spieth administration and designation as a general UC campus, 1950s and 1960s ==
At the time of the Strayer Report, the Regents did not believe California could afford multiple high-quality public universities. They intended that the newer campuses would become specialized. Riverside was designed to provide a high-quality liberal arts education, but would not support graduate-level research. However, the Regents soon found that continually increasing enrollment demands at Berkeley and Los Angeles required continuous expansion of the university at all levels and at all locations. The liberal arts college model, implemented by the Regents as a money-saving measure, was ultimately deemed too small and costly in light of the needs of California's rapidly growing population.

Biologist Herman Theodore Spieth, chair of the life sciences division, succeeded Watkins as provost upon his retirement in 1956. Spieth was already known to be a supporter of the idea of transitioning Riverside from a small liberal arts college into a full-fledged university, and his appointment was seen as a signal of the university administration's intent to move in that direction. The news of his appointment stirred up such open hostility from the faculty members who thought they had signed up under Watkins to work for a liberal arts college that Spieth never held a ceremony to inaugurate his provostship. UC President Clark Kerr was bewildered to discover years later that Watkins had inexplicably recommended Spieth as his replacement over the other leading candidate, Robert Nisbet; Watkins knew or should have known that Spieth's appointment would seal the fate of his liberal arts college.

By the time Kerr succeeded Sproul as president of the UC system in 1958, UCR was in its fifth year of operation and comprised 1,087 students. Kerr articulated a vision of UC as "one university, many campuses" and so Riverside, Santa Barbara, Davis and San Diego were all designated general campuses of the UC system by 1959. Like the provosts elsewhere, Spieth's title was upgraded from provost to chancellor. The Regents tasked him with increasing UCR's enrollment capacity to 5,000 students and administering UCR's development towards full university status. As UCR's first chancellor, Spieth was to combine the College of Letters and Science and the Citrus Research Center under a single academic and administrative entity, as well as oversee the planning and development of UCR's graduate division, in accord with the provisions of the developing California Master Plan for Higher Education. UCR started accepting graduate students in 1961; UCR's College of Agriculture, Air Pollution Research Center and the Dry-Lands Research Institute were also established during Spieth's administration.

One of Spieth's most important contributions to Riverside was in planning its campus. Oddly, Watkins attempted to use the liberal arts colleges of the East Coast as a model for campus design in the hot, arid Inland Empire, which meant the college's first buildings looked like a New England high school to Kerr. Spieth quickly shifted the Riverside campus towards Spanish- and Moorish-inspired architecture more appropriate for its arid climate.

=== The Kerr directives ===
In October 1959, President Kerr prohibited the student governments on all UC campuses from taking positions on off-campus political issues without the expressed permission of their resident chancellors. Students at Riverside picketed Spieth's office in protest, and student newspaper editors at Berkeley, Riverside and Santa Barbara signed a joint editorial condemning them. As the editor of the UCR Highlander summed up the opposition:

It appears that Riverside has been one of the leaders against the original directives, with Berkeley naturally taking a considerable role. Santa Barbara's newspaper opposed the directives from the beginning also, although little more than that was done. The Los Angeles campus was exceptionally slow in deciding anything, which some cynics have suggested as being quite typical of anything there. The Highlander, December 2, 1959.

In accordance with the Kerr directives, which also affected speakers on campus, in 1962 Spieth refused to let Nobel chemist Linus Pauling speak on disarmament because the subject was outside his academic field of expertise. The same year he also refused Dorothy Healy, former chair of the Southern California Communist Party, from speaking on campus. Six UCR students sued the Regents over Spieth's ruling against Healy, and the case was still pending when the Regents voted 15/2 to remove the outright ban on communist speakers in 1963.

=== The end of Spieth's administration ===
During the 1963–64 academic year, Spieth came to Kerr "to say, with tears in his eyes, that he had had enough of constant combat." Kerr arranged for Spieth to transfer to the Davis campus and resume research and teaching as a regular faculty member.

In his memoirs, Kerr expressed regret for not having recognized earlier and not having thought harder about how to alleviate the great burdens placed upon Spieth as UCR's first chancellor. The citrus experiment station saw the liberal arts college as an unwanted intruder on its precious land, while the faculty of the liberal arts college looked down upon the experiment station's agricultural researchers as "clodhoppers", and were also irate at the Regents and the university administration in Berkeley for transforming their little college into a full-fledged research university. And all "the lines of conflict intersected, with Spieth ... at the center."

== The Hinderaker administration, 1960s and 1970s ==
By the time UCR's second chancellor, Ivan Hinderaker, was inaugurated on September 29, 1964, the Free Speech Movement had begun in Berkeley. Hinderaker, who was photographed at his own inauguration carrying a placard borrowed from a student protester that said, "The University is not a Sandbox," cooperated with student activists that first year to develop such projects as the KUCR radio station, a campus child-care center, a political debate union, social events, fine arts workshops, and a few of his own projects such as Greek chapters and grants for student athletes. He negotiated a confrontation with student activists in ASUCR by suggesting the student council would be vacated if they did not rescind a resolution, which demanded President Lyndon B. Johnson support the right of African Americans to vote in Selma, Alabama. Five ASUCR officers, including the council president, resigned in protest of Hinderaker's position, and the remaining council members complied with his request. At a later protest against campus recruiting by Dow Chemicals, organized by Students for a Democratic Society, student activists camped inside the administration building were served coffee and donuts by Norm Better, the dean of Letters and Science.

It fell to Hinderaker to complete Spieth's unfinished task of turning UCR into a full-fledged research university. In doing this, he had to confront the early faculty whom Watkins had recruited on the premise that UCR Letters and Science would be a small liberal arts institution dedicated to teaching undergraduates. Many of UCR's early L&S faculty had achieved tenured positions without having to do extensive research, and saw themselves primarily as teachers. As Professor Charles Adrian, former Chair of UCR's Political Science Department, summarized the faculty situation:

It sort of was Ivan Hinderaker vs. the 'old UCR.' There was talk of the old UCR as if it were some kind of an organization. But it didn’t exist as such. It simply was the original faculty members and some who were hired shortly thereafter vs. the fact that Hinderaker was sent here to change that and make this a regular part of the university system... The resistance would be one thing if it were a minority, a smaller group of the whole faculty. But it was the dominant group that was hired here primarily to teach and who didn't want to do research ... and he was supposed to change this.

All Hinderaker could do to that effect was wait for these early faculty members to retire in order to appoint new faculty on a research basis. About this, Kerr later wrote that of all the chancellors with whom he personally worked, only Roger W. Heyns at Berkeley "had a more tormenting assignment than Spieth and Hinderaker had at Riverside".

Through the 1960s, UCR's enrollment had risen to a plateau of approximately 5,000 students, then it leveled off and began to steadily decrease during the 1970s. The main reason was air pollution. By 1972, UCR's official description in the UC statewide undergraduate admissions packet was already openly disclosing that Riverside was "hot with too much smog .... We are not perfect." (In the era before the World Wide Web, college applicants had to obtain mailing addresses from published hard copy directories of colleges and universities, then write by mail to request admissions materials.) One thing that helped to keep the campus alive was UC's redirection policy, under which undergraduate applicants denied admission to the campus of their choice were offered spaces at less popular campuses like Riverside. However, Hinderaker explained in 1972: "Redirection has been a negative rather than a plus. Some come with a chip on their shoulders so big they never give the campus a chance. They poison the attitudes of the students around them." In 1973, Riverside's Mayor Ben H. Lewis asked Governor Ronald Reagan to declare the South Coast Air Basin a disaster area. This caused Riverside to become famous throughout the United States for its air pollution and had disastrous effects on student enrollment and faculty recruitment at UCR. According to Hinderaker:

Irvine didn’t have smog. It’s hard to realize what a tremendous problem that was. Your budget is related to enrollment, so what effect did smog have?... UCR in 1971-2 was 5,576 [students]... By '78-'79, we had twenty five percent fewer students than we did in '71-'72. In terms of faculty positions, we had taken away from us in '72-'73 twelve, '73-'74 ten, '74-'75 twenty positions.

Rumors circulated that the campus would close. UC President David S. Saxon publicly suggested closing Riverside. In response, faculty members began to wryly call Riverside the "Hard-Luck Campus". Governor Jerry Brown proposed a merger with Cal State San Bernardino. Hinderaker developed UCR's competitive Biomedical Program and popular Business Administration Program partly as means of assuaging the enrollment problems created by Riverside's air quality. He also established UCR's graduate schools of education and administration, streamlined UCR's departmental structure, and presided over the establishment of the UCR/California Museum of Photography during this period.

== The 1980s ==
Due to poor receipts, Hinderaker terminated UCR's two-time Division II state championship football team in 1975. As a result of the 1978 passing of California Proposition 13, which drastically reduced the state's ability to fund higher education, another set of budgetary problems developed for UCR as well as for all the public education institutions in California.

After Hinderaker retired in 1979, a series of chancellors served short appointments as UCR's chief executive through the 1980s. While enrollment began to make modest but sustained annual gains in 1984, more than doubling by 1991, no single chancellor at Riverside was ever in office long enough during the 1980s to strategically direct UCR's overall development.

Upon his appointment, Tomas Rivera became UC's first minority chancellor and the first Latino leader of a major research university in the United States. He dismantled UCR's Black and Chicano Studies interdepartmental programs in response to the budget crisis. He suddenly died of a heart attack while in office in 1984. Daniel G. Aldrich served a one-year interim appointment as Chancellor before being replaced by Theodore L. Hullar, who began the push for more professional schools and locally supported development practices that would characterize later administrations.

Without warning, UC President David P. Gardner reassigned Hullar to the chancellorship at Davis in 1987 and appointed Rosemary S.J. Schraer as his replacement to serve as the UC system's first female chancellor at Riverside (in both cases without a formal committee-reviewed search process). Due to the enrollment gains during the 1980s, Schraer was able to appoint 200 new faculty members. Schraer died while in office in 1992, but not before completing a formal, peer-reviewed search process for her successor, Raymond Orbach. Orbach remained in office as chancellor for ten years (1992-2002) and like Hinderaker was able to strategically steer UCR's development during the 1990s.

=== Costo Archive ===
UCR has long been the recipient of significant support from members of the California Indian community. In 1986, Rupert and Jeannette Costo, who took part in the CUC campaign to found the university at Riverside, established the Costo Chair of American Indian Affairs at UCR, the first endowed chair of American Indian Studies in the United States and the first academic chair ever endowed at Riverside. They also bequeathed UCR their vast collections, establishing the Costo Library of the American Indian and Costo Archive.

There are Native American student programs and outreach services as well as high school recruitment at the nearby Sherman Indian School. These programs both recruit and aid Native American students.

== From 1990s to present: Riding Tidal Wave II ==
The American economy went into recession in the early 1990s, but when the economy began to improve in 1994, the UC campuses began to receive more applications than anticipated. This surge became known as "Tidal Wave II" (the first "tidal wave" of students having been the Baby Boom generation born in the post-World War II era). To help the UC system accommodate this growth, planners targeted UCR for an annual growth rate of 6.3%, the fastest in the UC system, and anticipated 19,900 students enrolled at UCR by 2010.

As enrollment increased, so did the ethnic diversity of the student body. By 1995, fully 30% of UCR students were members of non-Caucasian groups, the highest proportion of any campus in the UC system at the time. The 1997 implementation of Proposition 209 — which banned the use of race and ethnicity as criteria for admissions, hiring, promotions and contracting by state agencies (including the University of California) — had the effect of further increasing ethnic diversity at UCR while reducing it at the most selective campuses in the system. By 2007, fully 69% of undergraduates were members of non-Caucasian groups. Faculty diversity statistics, however, remained relatively constant. Of UCR faculty, 9.1% were members of underrepresented minority groups in 1997, only 2% higher than the UC average. This percentage dropped to the UC average of 7.3% in 2002, but was back up to 9% in 2006, making it the third-most diverse faculty in the UC system behind Merced and Santa Cruz. Still, given the diversity of the student body and within the surrounding area, this relative lack of diversity at the faculty level remains controversial.

With UCR scheduled for dramatic population growth, efforts have been made to increase its popular and academic recognition. The students voted to increase fees to move UCR athletics into NCAA Division I standing in 1998. Proposals to establish a law school, a medical school, and a school of public policy at UCR have been in development since the 90s. In June 2006, UCR received its largest gift, 15.5 million from two local couples, in trust towards building its medical school. The Regents formally approved UCR's medical school proposal in November 2006, but Chancellor Cordova's subsequent resignation to assume the leadership of Purdue University lead to a temporary suspension of the search for the med school dean until a search for a new chancellor could be completed.

== See also ==
- List of University of California, Riverside people
