= The Citrus Industry =

1943 botany book

- Authors: Herbert John Webber, Leon Dexter Batchelor, Robert Willard Hodgson, Walter Tennyson Swingle, Walter Reuther and more
- Language: English
- Subject: Citriculture
- Published: First Edition: 1943–1948 (University of California Press); Second Edition: 1967–1989 (University of California Press)
- Publication place: California, USA

The Citrus Industry is a book consisting of five volumes of scientific and experimental information on all the citrus species and varieties, originals as well as hybrids.

The book was produced by scientists associated with the University of California Citrus Experiment Station, and contains fundamental information on the variety description and cost effectiveness of growing, as well technical support for citrus cultivation. The name reflects its aim to support the success of the citrus industry in all means. It is considered the Bible of citrus farming.

== Revision ==
The book was originally published between the years 1943-1948, which is its first edition. It was revised in the 1960s by Walter Reuther with major reconstruction, and republished starting in 1976-1989. The Second Edition is much updated, but some interesting material was removed.

== Volumes, subjects and editors ==
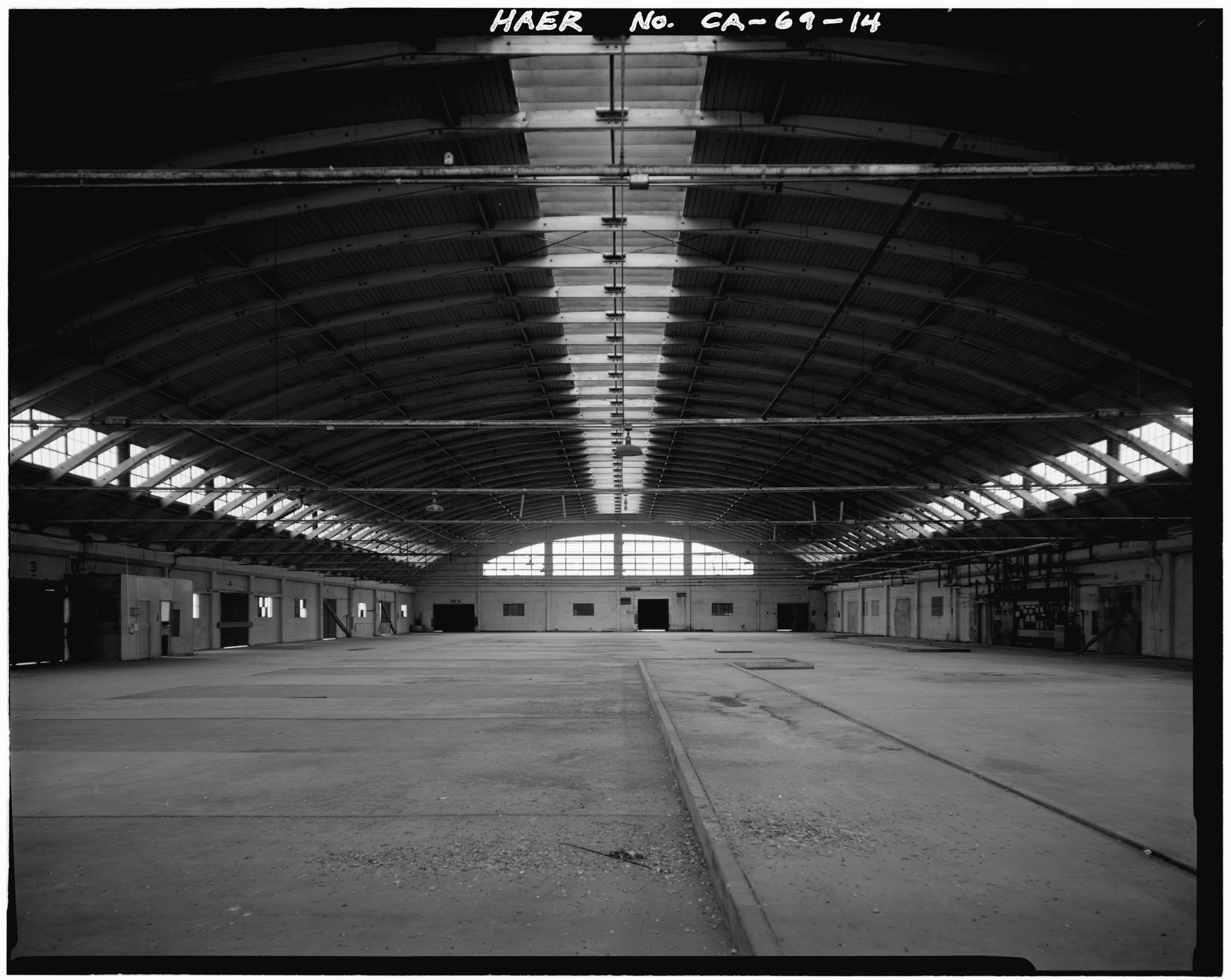
Packing house of oranges, in San Diego County, California.

- Volume I - History, World Distribution, Botany, and Varieties. Edited by: Walter Reuther, Herbert John Webber and Leon Dexter Batchelor, all respected professors of the University of California, Riverside. With the collaboration of: J. Henry Burke, Walter T. Swingle, Philip C. Reece, Robert Willard Hodgson, and Harry W. Lawton. The revised version of 1967, is digitally available online by the University of California, Riverside libraries website.
- Volume II - Anatomy, Physiology, Genetics, and Reproduction. Edited by: Walter Reuther, Leon Dexter Batchelor and Herbert John Webber, all respected professors of the University of California, Riverside, California. With the collaboration of: Henry Schneider, Louis C. Erickson, Homer D. Chapman, Howard B. Frost, Robert K. Soost, James W. Cameron, Charles W. Coggins, Jr., and Henry Z. Hield. The revised version of 1968, is digitally available online.
- Volume III - Production Technology, by Walter Reuther and Robert G. Platt. This volume is not available for free.
- Volume IV - Crop Protection, by Walter Reuther and more. This volume is not available for free.
- Volume V - Crop Protection (from cold, winds, citrus diseases and pests), Post-harvest Technology (washing, sorting, storage etc.), and Early History of Citrus Research in California. Edited by: Walter Reuther, E. Clair Calavan, Glenn E. Carman, Professors Emeriti of Horticulture, Plant Pathology, and Entomology, respectively, of the University of California, Riverside. With the collaboration of: Lee R. Jeppson, Glenn E. Carman, Joseph W. Eckert, Irving L. Eaks, Peter H. Tsao, James P. Martin, R. Michael Davis, Harry W. Lawton, and Lewis G. Weather. This volume is available online in PDF form.

Many of the mentioned are classical abbreviation authors, and the citations of their names are actually referring to this book.

== See also ==
- Essay on Pest Control
