= Alpha Zeta (professional) =

American professional fraternity for agriculture and natural resources

- ΑΖ
- Founded: November 4, 1897; 128 years ago Ohio State University
- Type: Professional and Honorary
- Affiliation: PFA
- Former affiliation: PIC
- Status: Active
- Emphasis: Agriculture, natural resources
- Scope: National
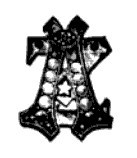
- Member badge
- Colors: Mode (Old gold) and Sky Blue
- Flower: Pink Carnation
- Publication: Alpha Zeta News
- Chapters: 31 active; 74 total
- Members: 1,000 active 125,000 lifetime
- Headquarters: Paducah, Kentucky 42002; United States
- Website: www.alphazeta.org

Alpha Zeta (ΑΖ) is a professional fraternity for students and industry professionals in agricultural and natural resources fields. It was founded in 1897 at Ohio State University and was the first collegiate society for agriculture.

== History ==
Charles W. Burkett and John F. Cunningham, roommates and students at the College of Agriculture at Ohio State University, founded the Alpha Zeta fraternity on November 4, 1897. Three years prior, Burkett and Cunnigham had the idea of forming an organization to support agricultural students, create fellowship, and promote agriculture. They recruited ten other agriculture students who became the fraternity's charter members, including

- Arthur G. Abbott
- Charles Burkett
- Clarence Clawson
- John Cunningham
- Vernon H. Davis
- Donnelley H. Duncan
- Oscar Erf
- Marion Imes
- Arthur G. McCall
- Carl J. Miller
- Charles B. Stewart
- Leonard C. Warden

Alpha Zeta formed as a professional fraternity but became an honorary fraternity in 1936. Its chapters were limited to land-grant institutions until 1951.

At the fraternity's 1940 Conclave, a proposal was presented to open membership to non-white males. This was presented at each Conclave for twelve years, finally passing in 1952. Also in 1952, a proposal to admit women was defeated with a tied vote. The fraternity's constitution was amended in 1972, allowing its chapters to initiate women.

The fraternity was headquartered in Washington, D.C. in the 1960s. It was located in Lafayette, Indiana from 1974 to 1994, when it moved to St. Louis, Missouri. Its headquarters is currently located in Paducah, Kentucky. As of 2023, Alpha Zeta has chartered 74 chapters.

Its print publication was the Quarterly of Alpha Zeta, first published in the early 20th century. AZ News is now its primary publication.

== Symbols ==
The fraternity's badge is a monogram of the letter Α on top of the letter Ζ, with a small star at the center of the Α. Its key is the shape of two overlapping circles in gold and black. Its colors are old gold (mode) and sky blue. Its flower is the pink carnation.

== Charitable activities ==
In 1942, Alpha Zeta began issuing scholarships to a select number of members for graduate studies. The Washington, D.C. Alumni Association helped form the National Alpha Zeta Foundation of America, Inc. in 1960, allowing the expansion of the scholarship program. The foundation accepts and manages donations for "scientific, educational and charitable purposes which best advance agriculture for the public good."

The Alpha Zeta Foundation, Inc. was formed in Indiana on April 4, 1984, to oversee the fraternity's national scholarship program and to support its leadership development program.

== Governance ==
The fraternity is overseen by a seven-member High Council that is elected by student representatives of each chapter at Biennial Conclaves held on odd calendar years. The council includes the High Chancellor, High Censor, High Scribe, High Treasurer, High Chronicler, Alumni Representative, and student representative. Alpha Zeta also has staff who oversee the fraternity's operations and communications.

== Membership ==
To be eligible for membership in Alpha Zeta, students must be majoring in agriculture or a related field, must have completed one year of study, and must be in the upper two-fifths of their class. Prospective members are also evaluated for character and leadership.

As of 2023, Alpha Zeta has initiated 125,000 members and has 1,000 active members. Its membership types are student, alumni, associate, and honorary. Honorary members can be nominated by chapters every ten years after their Charter date.

Membership was limited to white males for the fraternity's first 55 years but became open to any male in 1952. Membership was made open to women starting in 1972.

== Chapters ==
Following is a list of Alpha Zeta chapters. Active chapters are indicated in bold. Inactive chapters are in italics. Chapters are named in some way concerning agriculture or after the locality of the chapter.

Chapter	Charter date and range	Institution	Location	Region	Status	Ref.
**Townshend**	November 4, 1897	Ohio State University	Columbus, Ohio	Northeast	Active	(Note: Chapter was named for Norton Townshend, professor, and trustee of Ohio Agricultural and Mechanical College (now Ohio State).)
**Morrill**	1898–1900; 1903	Pennsylvania State University	University Park, Pennsylvania	Northeast	Active	
**Morrow**	June 1, 1900	University of Illinois Urbana-Champaign	Urbana, Illinois	North Central	Active	(Note: Chapter was named after George E. Morrow, the first dean of the University of Illinois College of Agriculture.)
**Cornell**	June 11, 1901	Cornell University	Ithaca, New York	Northeast	Active	
Kedzie	1902	Michigan State University	East Lansing, Michigan	North Central	Inactive	
Granite	1903	University of New Hampshire	Durham, New Hampshire	Northeast	Inactive	
**Nebraska**	1904	University of Nebraska–Lincoln	Lincoln, Nebraska	North Central	Active	
**North Carolina**	1904	North Carolina State University	Raleigh, North Carolina	Southeast	Active	
La Grange	February 22, 1905–1973	University of Minnesota	Saint Paul, Minnesota	North Central	Inactive	(Note: Chapter formed from the Berkshire Club (local). It joined Alpha Zeta with the assistance of Dr. C. P. Bull. The chapter was named to recognize Bull's leadership in The Grange, a progressive farm organization.)
Green Mountain	1905	University of Vermont	Burlington, Vermont	Northeast	Inactive	
**Wilson**	November 27, 1905	Iowa State University	Ames, Iowa	North Central	Active	(Note: Chapter was named in honor of James Wilson, the first professor of agriculture and the first director of the Agricultural Experiment Station at the Iowa Agricultural College. He was also a U.S. Secretary of Agriculture.)
Babcock	1906	University of Wisconsin–Madison	Madison, Wisconsin	North Central	Inactive	(Note: Chapter named for Dr. Steven Babcock who developed a ground-breaking butterfat test while teaching at the University of Wisconsin-Madison.)
Centennial	1906	Colorado State University	Fort Collins, Colorado	Western	Inactive	
Maine	1906	University of Maine	Orono, Maine	Northeast	Inactive	
Missouri	1907	University of Missouri	Columbia, Missouri	North Central	Inactive	
Elliott	1907	Washington State University	Pullman, Washington	Western	Inactive	
California	1908–1957	University of California, Berkeley	Berkeley, California	Western	Inactive	(Note: This chapter went defunct when the agriculture program was moved to another branch of the University of California system.)
**Purdue**	May 9, 1908	Purdue University	West Lafayette, Indiana	North Central	Active	
**Kansas**	1909	Kansas State University	Manhattan, Kansas	North Central	Active	
Dacotah	1909	North Dakota State University	Fargo, North Dakota	North Central	Inactive	
Scovell	1912	University of Kentucky	Lexington, Kentucky	Southeast	Inactive	
Morgan	1912	University of Tennessee	Knoxville, Tennessee	Southeast	Inactive	
Georgia	1914	University of Georgia	Athens, Georgia	Southeast	Inactive	
Louisiana	1916	Louisiana State University	Baton Rouge, Louisiana	Southeast	Inactive	
**Oklahoma**	1916	Oklahoma State University–Stillwater	Stillwater, Oklahoma	Southwest	Active	
Arkansas	1917	University of Arkansas	Fayetteville, Arkansas	South Central	Inactive	
Oregon	1918	Oregon State University	Corvallis, Oregon	Western	Inactive	
Maryland	1920	University of Maryland	College Park, Maryland	Northeast	Inactive	
Idaho	1920	University of Idaho	Moscow, Idaho	Western	Inactive	
**Montana**	1922	Montana State University	Bozeman, Montana	Western	Active	
**Florida**	1922	University of Florida	Gainesville, Florida	Southeast	Active	
**Cook**	1922	Rutgers University	New Brunswick, New Jersey	Northeast	Active	(Note: Chapter named for Cook College, a division of Rutgers.)
West Virginia	1922	West Virginia University	Morgantown, West Virginia	Northeast	Inactive	
**South Dakota**	1924	South Dakota State University	Brookings, South Dakota	North Central	Active	
New Mexico	1927	New Mexico State University	Las Cruces, New Mexico	South Central	Inactive	
Arizona	1927	University of Arizona	Tucson, Arizona	Western	Inactive	
Mississippi	1928	Mississippi State University	Starkville, Mississippi	Southeast	Inactive	
South Carolina	1930	Clemson University	Clemson, South Carolina	Southeast	Inactive	
**Virginia**	1932	Virginia Tech	Blacksburg, Virginia	Southeast	Active	
Wyoming	1933	University of Wyoming	Laramie, Wyoming	Western	Inactive	
Rhode Island	May 29, 1936	University of Rhode Island	Kingston, Rhode Island	Northeast	Inactive	
California Beta	1937–1961	University of California, Los Angeles	Los Angeles, California	Western	Inactive	
Utah	1939	Utah State University	Logan, Utah	Western	Inactive	
California Gamma	1940	University of California, Davis	Davis, California	Western	Inactive	
Alabama	1941	Auburn University	Auburn, Alabama	Southeast	Inactive	
**Delaware**	1949	University of Delaware	Newark, Delaware	Northeast	Active	
**Texas Alpha**	1951	Texas A&M University	College Station, Texas	Southwest	Active	
**Texas Beta**	1951	Texas Tech University	Lubbock, Texas	Southwest	Active	
**Connecticut**	1952	University of Connecticut	Storrs, Connecticut	Northeast	Active	
Massachusetts	1956	University of Massachusetts Amherst	Amherst, Massachusetts	Northeast	Inactive	
California Delta	1959	California Institute of Technology	Pasadena, California	Western	Inactive	
**Puerto Rico**	1959	University of Puerto Rico at Mayagüez	Mayagüez, Puerto Rico	Southeast	Active	
**Illinois Beta**	1960	Southern Illinois University Carbondale	Carbondale, Illinois	North Central	Active	
**California Epsilon**	1962–xxxx?; 2005	California State University, Fresno	Fresno, California	Western	Active	
Nevada	1963	University of Nevada, Reno	Reno, Nevada	Western	Inactive	
Arizona Beta	1964	Arizona State University	Tempe, Arizona	Western	Inactive	
Louisiana Beta	1964	Southwestern Louisiana University	Lafayette, Louisiana	South Central	Inactive	
California Zeta	1966	California Polytechnic State University	San Luis Obispo, California	Western	Inactive	
**Illinois Gamma**	January 29, 1966	Western Illinois University	Macomb, Illinois	North Central	Active	
Utah Beta	1970	Brigham Young University	Provo, Utah	Western	Inactive	
**Wisconsin Beta**	1971	University of Wisconsin–Platteville	Platteville, Wisconsin	North Central	Active	
**Texas Gamma**	1972	Tarleton State University	Stephenville, Texas	Southwest	Active	
**Wisconsin Gamma**	1972	University of Wisconsin–River Falls	River Falls, Wisconsin	North Central	Active	
**Illinois Delta**	1974	Illinois State University	Normal, Illinois	North Central	Active	
**Louisiana Gamma**	1974	Louisiana Tech University	Ruston, Louisiana	Southwest	Active	
Tennessee Beta	1976	University of Tennessee at Martin	Martin, Tennessee	Southeast	Inactive	
Texas Delta	March 26, 1977	West Texas A&M University	Canyon, Texas	South Central	Inactive	(Note: Chapter formed from the Alpha Zeta Club (local), established in 1968.)
Alabama Carver	1979	Alabama A&M University	Huntsville, AL	Southeast	Inactive	
Murray	1981	Murray State University	Murray, KY	Southeast	Inactive	
**Mount Berry**	1987	Berry College	Mount Berry, Georgia	Southeast	Active	
**Oklahoma Beta**	1989	Oklahoma Panhandle State University	Goodwell, Oklahoma	Southwest	Active	
Western Kentucky	1991	Western Kentucky University	Bowling Green, KY	South Central	Inactive	
**California Eta**	2004	California State University, Chico	Chico, California	Western	Active	
**Louisiana Delta**	2023	Southern University	Baton Rouge, LA	Southeast	Active	

== Notable members ==
Named	Chapter and year	Notability	Ref.
George Aiken	Green Mountain 1956 (Honorary)	horticulturist, Governor of Vermont, U.S. Senate	
Alfred Atkinson	Montana	agronomist, President of Montana State University, and president of University of Arizona	
Liberty Hyde Bailey	Cornell 1901 (Honorary)	Horticulturalist, founder of American Society for Horticultural Sciences, first dean of the College of Agriculture and Life Sciences at Cornell University.	
Robert C. Baker	Cornell 1943	Inventor of the chicken nugget and professor emeritus of Food Science at Cornell University	
Leon Dexter Batchelor	Granite	horticulture professor and director of the University of California Citrus Experiment Station	
Ezra Taft Benson	1953 (Honorary)	U.S. Secretary of Agriculture	
John Rusling Block		U.S. Secretary of Agriculture	
Norman Borlaug	La Grange	Nobel laureate	
Edgar B. Brossard	La Grange	college professor; economist; and chair of the U.S. Tariff Commission	
Lester R. Brown	Cook	founder of the Earth Policy Institute	
Earl Butz	Purdue 1931	U.S. Secretary of Agriculture	
Herman Cain		former chairman and CEO of Godfather's Pizza	
Elbert N. Carvel		Lieutenant Governor of Delaware and fertilizer manufacture	
Arthur B. Chapman	Elliott (Honorary)	Animal genetic researcher	
Walter Clore	Oklahoma (Honorary)	Father of the Washington wine industry	
John Eliot Coit	North Carolina	horticulture professor specializing in avocado, citrus and carob	
Dwight D. Eisenhower	Morrill (Honorary)	President of the United States	
Arthur Rose Eldred	Cornell 1916	Agriculturalist, first Eagle Scout recognized by the Boy Scouts of America	
Orville Freeman	1962 (Honorary)	Governor of Minnesota, U.S. Secretary of Agriculture	
Dan Glickman		U.S. Secretary of Agriculture; president of the Motion Picture Association of America	
John A. Hannah	Kedzie (Honorary)	president of Michigan State College	
Clifford M. Hardin	Purdue 1953	U.S. Secretary of Agriculture	
Otto Frederick Hunziker	Purdue	pioneer in the dairy industry, educator, and technical innovator	
William Marion Jardine	Kansas 1911	U.S. Secretary of Agriculture, agronomist and president of Kansas State Agricultural College	
W. Pat Jennings	Virginia 1941	United States House of Representatives	
Edwin Jackson Kyle	Cornell 1902	U.S. Ambassador to Guatemala and namesake of Texas A&M's Kyle Field	
Jerry Litton	Missouri	United States House of Representatives	
Richard Lugar	Purdue (Honorary)	United States Senator	
Richard Lyng	Wilson 1974 (Honorary)	U.S. Secretary of Agriculture	
Al Maeder	La Grange	Professional football player	
Ron Micheli	Wyoming	director of the Wyoming Department of Agriculture and Wyoming House of Representatives	
Gerald A. Miller	Virginia	agronomist, professor, and associate dean emeritus at Iowa State University	
Henry A. Munger	Cornell 1936	Vegetable breeder, professor and department chair Cornell University	
Robert B. Patterson	Mississippi	football player, planter, and founder of the first Citizens' Councils	
Stanley M. Powell	Kedzie	farmer and Michigan House of Representatives	
Roland Renne	Cook	economist and president of Montana State College - Bozeman	
Scott Rivkees	Cook	Surgeon General of Florida	
Nelson Rockefeller	Cornell 1962 (Honorary)	Governor of New York, Vice President of the United States	
Richard Rominger	California Davis	Deputy Secretary of Agriculture (1993-2001)	
Henry P. Rusk	Missouri	dean of the Department of Agriculture, University of Illinois	
Albert Schatz	Cook	microbiologist and co-discoverer of streptomycin	
Robert W Scott	North Carolina	Governor of North Carolina	
Bob Sikes	Georgia	United States House of Representatives	
Mark G. Thornburg	Wilson	Secretary of Agriculture of Iowa	
Victor A. Tiedjens	Babcock	horticulturist, agronomist, biochemist, and soil chemist	
Selman Waksman	California Alpha	Nobel Prize in Physiology or Medicine, microbiologist, and co-discoverer of streptomycin	
Henry A. Wallace	Wilson 1908	Vice President of the United States, U.S. Secretary of Agriculture, U.S. Secretary of Commerce	
Henry Cantwell Wallace	1922 (Honorary)	U.S. Secretary of Agriculture	
Herbert John Webber	Nebraska	plant physiologist, professor, and first director of the University of California Citrus Experiment Station	
James Wilson	Wilson (Honorary)	U.S. Secretary of Agriculture, academic	
M. L. Wilson	Wilson 1907	Agronomist, professor, and Undersecretary of the U.S. Department of Agriculture	
Kenneth E. Wing	Cornell 1958	President of State University of New York at Cobleskill	
Dale E. Wolf	Nebraska	Lieutenant Governor of Delaware and temporary Governor of Delaware	
Clayton Yeutter	Nebraska 1950	U.S. Secretary of Agriculture	

== See also ==
- Professional fraternities and sororities
