= John Eliot Coit =

- Born: March 9, 1880; San Antonio, Texas
- Died: June 4, 1976 (aged 96)
- Citizenship: USA
- Known for: Father of avocado industry in California
- Spouse(s): Emilie A. Hanna, Luise Gait Viney
- Children: Eleanor, Frances and Lucy
- Scientific career
- Notable students: Robert Willard Hodgson

John Eliot Coit (March 9, 1880 – June 4, 1976) was an American professor specializing in the horticultural fields of avocado, citrus and carob, and second curator of University of California Citrus Variety Collection

== Early life ==
John Eliot Coit was reared in Texas and North Carolina. He spent much of his early life learning the fundamentals of agriculture on experimentally level, with shovel and hoe.

He entered the North Carolina State University College of Agriculture and Life Sciences in 1899, graduating in agriculture in 1903.

== Career ==
Soon he became assistant professor of Pomology, University of California at the Whittier Pathological Laboratory and at the University of California Citrus Experiment Station, in Riverside, California. He was Superintendent of the Citrus Experiment Station at Mount Rubidoux in 1911–1912, and in that position was instrumental in selecting the site of the present Citrus Research Center and Experiment Station at Riverside.

From 1913 to 1917, Coit was Professor of Citriculture, University of California, Berkeley. Farm Advisor, Los Angeles County, 1917 to 1919. In 1919 he founded the "Coit Agricultural Service" and is today continuing in this line of service.

Among agricultural organizations, Coit has served as director of the Sierra Madre Lamanda Citrus Association, the California Avocado Association in 1915 and again from 1923 to 1947, and served as president three terms. In 1924 he helped organize the California Avocado Growers Association (now Calavo) and served as director until 1944.

Coit's literary accomplishments have been valuable contributions both as technical and of a popular nature. He served as editor of the California Avocado Society Yearbook from 1932 until 1948. He also authored the "Citrus fruits" book, which is an account of the citrus fruit industry, with special reference to California requirements and practices (Jan 1, 1915), and "A peony check-list" including the leading varieties of peonies of which authentic descriptions can be found in horticultural literature... (Jan 1, 1907)

== Awards ==
Dr. Coit has received honorary awards including: Fellow, American Association for the Advancement of Science. Sigma Xi, Cornell University 1905, and is a member of Alpha Zeta and Gamma Alpha. He received the first Award of Honor from the California Avocado Society and was presented with a Special Award of Honor in 1956, and in 1963 was made director emeritus by the Board in appreciation of his many contributions to the industry.

The following from the 1939 Yearbook of the California Avocado Society, is a succinct statement of the service of John Eliot Coit to the avocado industry:

Dr. J. Eliot Coit is truly "The Father of the California Avocado Industry." From its babyhood or the time when growing avocados was a hobby, through adolescence or the transitional period into maturity as a full fledged industry Dr. Coit has been its able and watchful parent. Long after his name will have been forgotten, consumers in New York as well as growers in California will unknowingly feel Dr. Coit's influence.

No other individual deserves to be called "The father of the California Avocado Industry" than Dr. J. Eliot Coit. – California Avocado Society 1976 Yearbook 60: 11-13

== Personal life ==
John Eliot Coit married Emilie A. Hanna in 1907 at Durham, North Carolina. They had three girls: Eleanor, Frances and Lucy. His first wife died August 10, 1924. In 1926 Coit was married to Luise Gait Viney of Pasadena. His second wife died on August 25, 1962.
