= Margaret Campbell Mann Lesley =

American cytologist and geneticist (1891–1988)

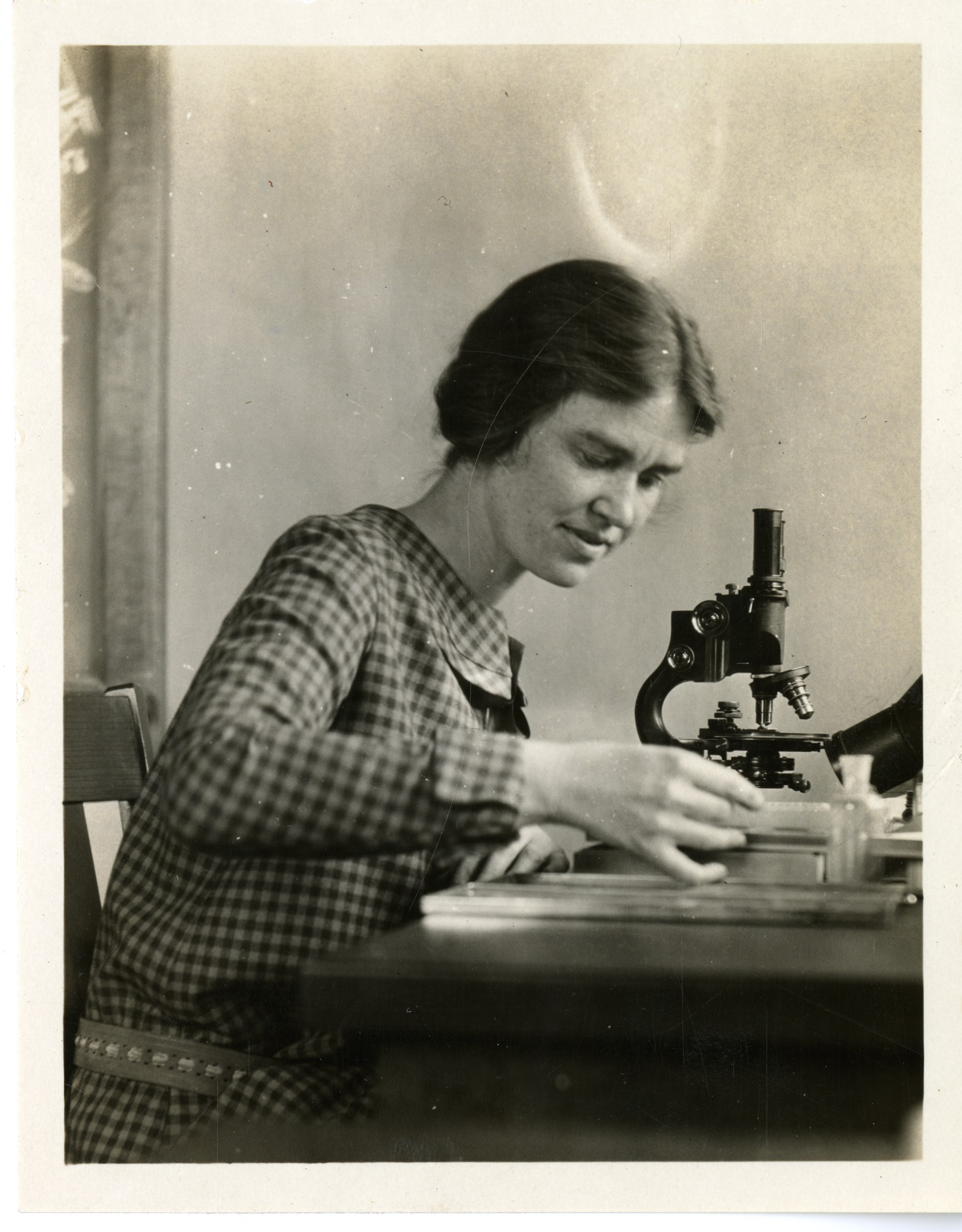
Margaret Campbell Mann Lesley

Margaret Campbell Mann Lesley (1891–1988) was an American cytologist and geneticist who specialized in plant breeding cytogenetics. Her primary work focused on cytological analyses of tomatoes and citrus. She was an active research assistant to Howard B. Frost (1881–1969), an Associate Plant Breeder at the Citrus Experiment Station, and to James W. Lesley (1888–1982), her husband, whom she extensively collaborated and conducted research on tomato breeding.

== Early life and education ==
Lesley was born Margaret Campbell Mann on 1891 in Michigan. Lesley received her bachelor's degree from the University of Oregon in 1915. She then continued to work on her doctoral degree at the University of California, Berkeley, where she received her master's degree in zoology in 1918 and her Ph.D. in genetics in 1921. She began her career as a research associate at the University of California, Berkeley, She was later assigned to the Citrus Experiment Station in 1924, carrying out the cytological work for Dr. Howard B. Frost, which she also co-published as a junior author.

Lesley met her husband and research collaborator, James W. Lesley, while working at the Citrus Experiment Station. They married in 1924 and lived in Riverside, California. They had two daughters, Celia and Enid.

== Career ==
Lesley conducted her study in tomatoes' genetics and published most of her work in The American Naturalist as a sole author, an uncommon phenomenon for a woman scientist in the early twentieth century. Like many women scientists, Lesley was a detailed illustrator of her scientific observations under the microscope.

=== Individual research ===
Lesley's independent publication focused on the chromosomal chimeras in tomatoes. As a plant geneticist, Lesley pursued the study of cross-sectioning tomato plants, cutting root tips from two tomato plants and grafting the two to grow a hybrid tomato. The result was split; Lesley found tetraploid either as a whole or in part of the tomato plant while the others showed as diploid. The attempt to produce giant shoots like that of Winkler's tetraploid tomato from root cutting was a failure. However, her studies of the tomato roots' tetraploid areas showed that the mutation does not represent degenerative changes.

=== Collaboration with Howard B. Frost ===
Lesley contributed to Dr. Howard B. Frost's studies of the genus Matthiola as a cytogeneticist and co-author. The studies in Matthiola mutation was initiated by Dr. Frost that began as early as 1915 at the Citrus Experiment Station. The significance of the research on Matthiola is the discovery of the cytogenetic foundation to the doubleness of the flowers. The earliest publication of the collaboration between Frost and Lesley began in 1924 and expanded up to 1928. Lesley provided the cytological evidence and prepared all the figures and illustrations for their studies.

Lesley and Frost obtained their hybrid mutant Matthiola plants from Edith R. Saunders in 1925 which made their studies possible. They saw that the mutant Matthiola developed leaves that are small, flat and rigid compared a regular plant. The mutant plant produced little to no seed and completely sterile.

=== Collaboration with James W. Lesley ===
The collaboration between Margaret Mann Lesley and James W. Lesley was initiated in the late summer of 1923, when a seedling tomato plant was observed not to be bearing any fruit while other plants of the same variety were producing an ample amount. The Lesleys' cytological and genetic study resulted in their findings of hereditary variegation and parthenocarpy in tomato plants.

In 1959, the Lesleys jointly received the L.H. Vaughan Award from the American Society for Horticultural Science due to their great contribution in hybrid tomato production using a line of male sterile mutant plant.

In 1979, the Lesleys established the James & Margaret Lesley Endowment at University of California, Riverside to support the students in the Department of Biological and Agricultural Sciences.
