= UC Riverside Citrus Variety Collection =

Collection of citrus in California, United States

Coordinates: 33.9725°N 117.3250°W

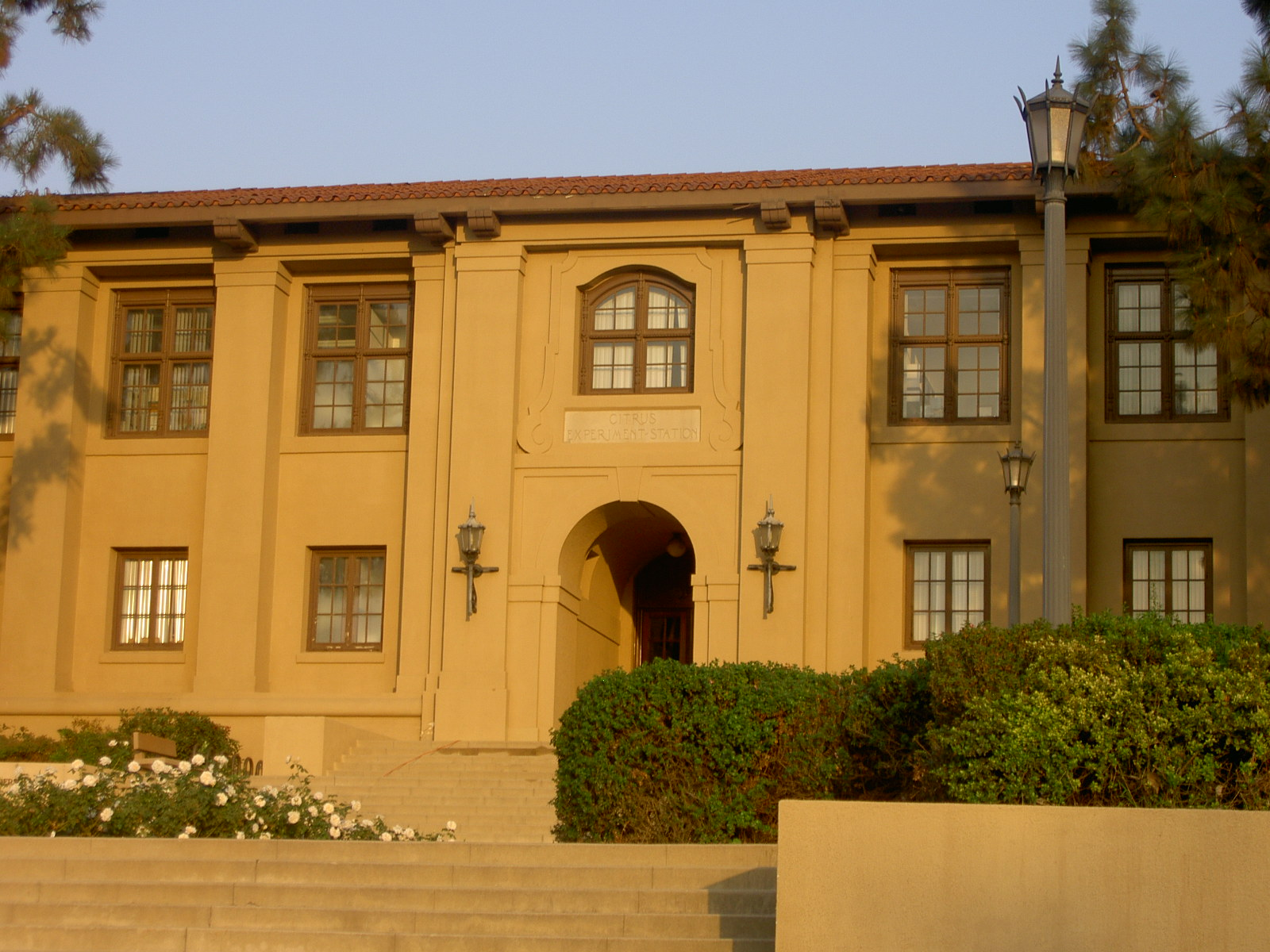
Original building of the UC Citrus Experiment Station

The UCR Citrus Variety Collection (CVC) is one of the most important collections of citrus diversity in the world. It is used for research, plant breeding, and educational extension activities on the UC Riverside campus in Riverside, California.

== Holdings ==
The collection is composed of over 1000 accessions, planted as two trees of each of various types of citrus and citrus relatives. The collection largely comprises accessions within the genus Citrus, the remaining types are included among 28 other related genera in the Rutaceae subfamily Aurantioideae.

The collection consists of approximately 25 acres (10 ha) on the UCR campus, 2 acres (0.81 ha) at the South Coast Research and Extension Center in Irvine, California, and 2 acres (0.81 ha) at the Coachella Valley Agricultural Research Station in Thermal, California. It includes accessions that were first introduced in the early 20th century, as well as varieties brought in over time from various curators, and newer varieties that were more recently developed by breeding or brought in as material through the Citrus Clonal Protection Program (CCPP), a special program that evaluates the trees for the nursery and citrus industries.

== History ==
The CVC was first established with approximately 500 species of citrus planted on 5 acres (2.0 ha) by Herbert John Webber, professor of plant breeding and director of the early UC Citrus Experiment Station.

== Services ==
The collection currently serves as a genetic resource for research and breeding. Other research being conducted in the collection ranges from subjects related to entomology, nematology, microbiology, plant pathology, soil science, and metabolomics. In addition, the USDA-ARS National Clonal Germplasm Repository for Citrus and Dates (NCGRCD) uses the collection for the conservation of genetic diversity within the family Rutaceae.

The collection is one of the most diverse citrus germplasm collections. Aside from its foundations of supporting research, the collection also supports educational tours and extension activities through the University of California, Riverside.

== Curators ==
- R. Smith (1909–1911) Superintendent of Whittier and Rubidoux Labs
- John Eliot Coit (1911–1912) Superintendent of Whittier and Rubidoux Labs
- Herbert John Webber (1912–1936) Director of Citrus Experiment Station
- Leon Dexter Batchelor (1936–1946) Director of Citrus Experiment Station
- Willard Paul Bitters (1946–1982) Professor of Horticulture
- Robert K. Soost (1982–1986) Professor of Genetics
- E.M. Nauer (1982–1989) Specialist
- M.L. Roose (1986–1995) Professor of Genetics
- R.W. Scora (1986–1995) Professor of Botany
- K.D. Bowman (1990–1992) Senior Museum Scientist
- Tracy L. Kahn (1995–current) Senior Museum Scientist

== See also ==
- Citrus taxonomy
- Oroblanco
