= Giorgio Gallesio =

Italian botanist (1772–1839)

- Born: 23 May 1772; Finalborgo, Province of Savona, Republic of Genoa
- Died: 30 November 1839 (aged 67); Florence, Grand Duchy of Tuscany
- Scientific career
- Fields: Botany, plant systematics

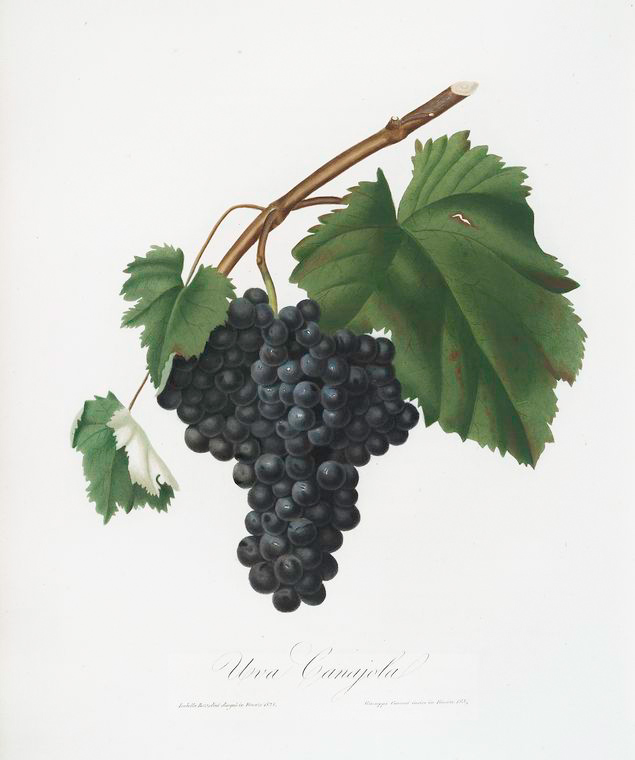
Illustration of Canaiola grapes from Gallesio's book Pomona Italiana or Treatise of fruit trees

Giorgio Gallesio (in English and French sources Georges Gallesio, 23 May 1772 – 30 November 1839) was an Italian botanist and researcher of the 18th and 19th centuries, specializing in citrus. His famous book Traité du citrus was first printed in 1811 and reprinted in 1826 due to its popularity. In this work, he presented his findings that hybrids are offspring of outcross pollination and not due to grafting as previously thought. He also studied the family barriers affecting species compatibility and gave a good account of the history and distribution of citrus. He was widely cited in many works of his day, and also in The Citrus Industry book, by Webber, Batchelor and others.

He has a further minor claim to fame as the first person to use the expression 'dominant' (in Italian, 'dominante') to refer to the hereditary transmission of characters when plants are hybridised ("Quindi la loro combinazione, non essendo naturale, riesce inconstante nei suoi effeti, e questi portano, ora l'impronta di un principio, ora di un altro, in proporzione che ve ne è uno dominante." Gallesio, Giorgio. Teoria della Riproduzione Vegetale, Pisa: Nicolo Capurro, 1816, p 79. English translation in Stubbe, Hans. History of Genetics, pp. 107–108). The term appears in a passage in which Gallesio describes the hybridisation of two strains of carnations having red and white flowers.

== Bibliography ==
- — (1811). Traité du citrus (in French). L. Fantin.
- — (1820). Pomona italiana parte scientifica fascicolo primo contenente il trattato del fico (in Italian). presso Niccolò Capurro Company' caratteri di Didot.

== Biography ==
- Ferraro, C.; Gallesio, G. (1996). Giorgio Gallesio (1772-1839): vita, opere, scritti e documenti inediti. I Georgofili (in Italian). Accademia dei Georgofili.
