= Pixie mandarin =

Variety of fruit

Pixie
- Hybrid parentage: One parent is a Cam sành (King orange) and Dancy hybrid, the other unknown
- Cultivar: Pixie
- Origin: California

Pixie mandarin, also called Pixie tangerine, is a variety of mandarin that is late ripening and seedless.

== Development ==
Pixie was developed by Howard Brett Frost at the University of California, Riverside Citrus Research Center in 1927, and was eventually released in 1965 by his colleagues James W. Cameron and Robert K. Soost.

Frost was trying to cross two mandarin varieties, King and Dancy, to combine the late ripening of the King tangor with the richness in flavor of Dancy. The result was Kincy, which was large and seedy. Pixie is the second generation progeny of an open pollinated seedling of Kincy; the male parent is uncertain. Thus, the Pixie is either an F2 hybrid resulting from the Kincy F1 hybrid status, or a hybrid by itself between the Kincy and an unknown donor.
