= James W. Cameron =

James W. Cameron (23 April 1913 – 12 January 2010) was a professor of horticultural science, a geneticist and citrus breeder in the University of California Citrus Experiment Station.

== Breeding ==
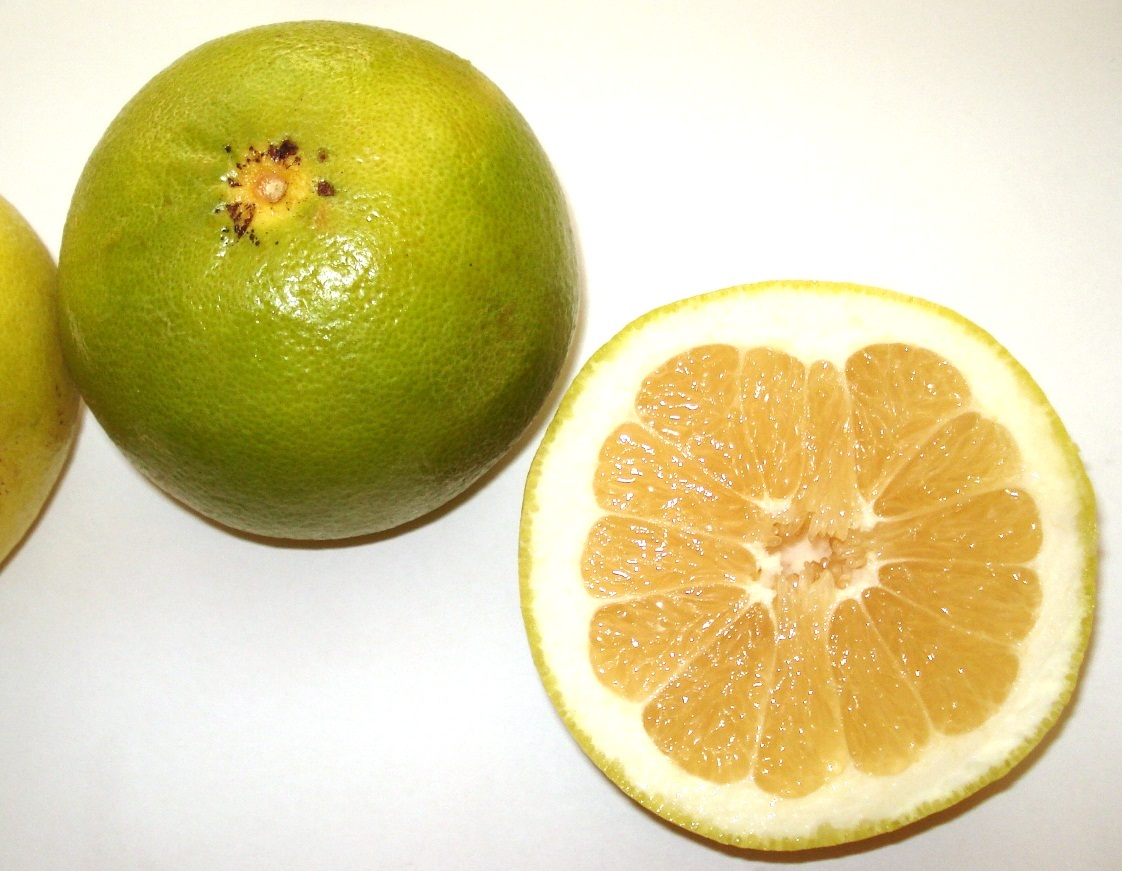
Oroblanco is a very popular grapefruit variety, praised for its sweetness. Was developed by James W. Cameron together with Robert K. Soost.

Together with Robert Soost he developed the Oroblanco and Melogold grapefruits, and the encore and pixie mandarins, which turned out to be of major importance. By 1954, he had developed 484 hybrid citrus seedlings, most of them resistant against nematodes, together with Richard C. Baines.

Cameron was a co-author on volume II of The Citrus Industry.

== Academic writings ==
- Nucellar Seedlings may permit development of disease-free citrus varieties
- Tree and fruit characters of Citrus triploids from tetraploid by diploid crosses
- Chemico-Genetic Bases for the Reserve Carbohydrates in Maize Endosperm, PDF full
- Nuclear lines of citrus: Tree size, yield, and fruit characters of old and young lines of ten citrus varieties compared
