= Soost =

Soost is a surname. Notable people with the surname include:

- Detlef Soost (born 1970), German television personality, dancer, and choreographer
- Robert Soost (1920–2009), American citrus expert and professor
