= UC Riverside Insectary and Quarantine Facilities =

Coordinates: 33.97044°N 117.32475°W

The UCR Insectary and Quarantine Facilities are where foreign insect and mite predators and parasites are confined and screened before propagation and release in California and the United States. This complex of facilities was first established in 1923 as part of the UC Citrus Experiment Station, and is currently managed by the University of California, Riverside Department of Entomology. The complex supports integrated pest management and biological pest control, research, and includes the Insectary, Quarantine Facility, Insect Preparation Facility, eight specialized greenhouses, a lathhouse, and storage.

The Quarantine Facility is one of 14 approved biological control quarantine facilities in the U.S. and the oldest non-federal facility in the nation.
