= Alfred M. Boyce =

American entomologist

Alfred Mullikin Boyce
- Born: May 2, 1901; Maryland
- Died: July 11, 1997 (aged 96); Riverside, California
- Education: B.S. 1926 Cornell University: M.S. 1927 Cornell University; Ph.D 1931 University of California, Berkeley
- Occupation: Entomologist
- Spouse: Janet Mabry Boyce

Alfred Mullikin Boyce (May 2, 1901 – July 11, 1997) was an American entomologist and first dean of University of California, Riverside's College of Agriculture.

== Early life and education ==
Boyce grew up on his family's farm in Maryland. After spending 1919 at the Annapolis campus of St. John's College, Boyce embarked as a seaman aboard several commercial vessels. Boyce served as a crewman aboard the ill-fated SS Philadelphia and was arrested along with the rest of the crew by Italian authorities during the 1922 mutiny.

Boyce enrolled at Cornell University in 1923, earning his bachelor's and master's degrees. 1927 he took a temporary research position at the Citrus Experiment Station in Riverside, California. Though he had initially intended to return to Cornell, Boyce transferred to University of California earning his doctorate at UC Berkeley in 1931.

== Professional life ==
Boyce became an associate professor of entomology at Riverside in 1933 while he continued to work at the Citrus Experimentation Station. He was advanced to full professor in 1942 and became the head of the entomology department in 1943. At the urging of Harry Scott Smith, Boyce made an overseas trip in 1951 on behalf of the Foreign Agricultural Service to identify natural predators of the Scale insect as a measure of biological control, to protect California's olive crop. Boyce took his wife Dr. Janet Mabry Boyce (also an entomologist) along to capture and import the appropriate insects. Upon their return, Boyce was appointed the head of the station at Riverside replacing the retiring Leon D. Batchelor. Boyce was a proponent of nematology, supporting the creation of a separate department of nematology within University of California with Dr. Dewey J. Raski as the new department's chair. Boyce appeared on the March 25th, 1956 episode of The New Edgar Bergen Hour In 1960, Boyce was appointed the first Dean of the College of Agriculture where he remained until his retirement from teaching in 1968. He continued to serve as an agricultural advisor to the Rockefeller Foundation until 1974. Boyce's papers are archived at UCR.

== Publications ==
- Turrell, F. M.; Boyce, A. M. (April 1953). "Effect of Quality and Intensity of Solar Radiation on Injury of Lemon Fruit by Sulphur Treatment in the Field". Plant Physiology. 28 (2): 151–176. doi:10.1104/pp.28.2.151. JSTOR 4258640. PMC 540371. PMID 16654531.
- Webber, Herbert John; Batchelor, Leon Dexter, eds. (1946). "Insects and Mites and Their Control". The Citrus Industry. University of California Press. pp. 665–812.
- Odyssey of an Entomologist: Adventures on the Farm, at Sea, and in the University Foundation. University of California, Riverside. June 1986. OCLC 15644827.

== Honors and awards ==
- UCR created the "Al Boyce lecture series"
- The Alfred M. Boyce Chair in entomology was established by the UCR Board of Regents in 1984.
- Boyce Hall on the UCR campus
- Boyce received a number of awards from citrus farmers including California Citrus Quality Council's Albert G. Salter Memorial Award.

== See also ==
- The Citrus Industry
