= John Coit =

John Coit may refer to:

- John J. Coit, American railroad engineer,
- John Eliot Coit, American professor specializing in the horticultural fields of avocado, citrus and carob

== See also ==
- John Coit Spooner, politician and lawyer from Wisconsin
