= California Avocado Commission =

US agricultural marketing organization and trade association

- Company type: trade association
- Industry: agricultural marketing organization
- Founded: 1961; California, United States
- Headquarters: Irvine, California

The California Avocado Commission is an agricultural marketing organization and trade association serving avocado producers in the American state of California.

== Avocado production in California ==
Avocados, native to Central and South America, have long been produced in California. In 1989, California supplied 90 percent of fresh avocados produced in the United States. As of 2008, approximately 6,500 growers produce avocados on 60,000 bearing acres of land (less than 100 square miles). Price and production levels vary from season to season, and from year to year, due to weather and incidents such as fires. In a typical year production averages 350 million pounds at a wholesale price of $1 per pound, although 2008 was an exceptionally low yield year. Most avocados are grown from San Luis Obispo south, with San Diego County the largest producer.

== Organization history ==
The California Avocado Commission's predecessor organization, the California Avocado Advisory Board, was organized in 1961 out of dissatisfaction by individual growers with the success of the state's largest agricultural cooperative, Calavo Growers, to secure stable prices for avocados. New laws were passed allowing growers to form an association that would obtain a compulsory contribution from businesses directly involved in the avocado industry, and use the money to advertise and promote avocados to consumers throughout America. The Board assumed this marketing responsibility from Calavo, which continued to manage distribution and relations with retailers for the 60% of growers who remained in the co-op.

The newly organized Board began marketing avocados to American consumers, attempting to downplay the fruit's Mexican origin in favor of an exotic tropical or Mediterranean image, as well as its suitability for mass-produced processed food. The Board also attempted to counter the avocado's reputation as being unhealthy and fattening, a marketing effort that has continued sporadically through the present in an attempt to increase sales.

In the 1970s guacamole, once primarily consumed in America by Mexican-Americans, became popular throughout America, initially due to a Sunset Magazine cover story featuring avocado recipes. In the late 1970s to early 1980s consumption surged again due to Latino immigration. During the period avocado consumption tripled in Mexico as well.

The present Commission was organized in 1978 as a successor to the Advisory Board.

In the 1980s there was a boom in avocado planting in California, mostly by small, semi-professional growers. Throughout the 1980s and 1990s the Commission lobbied to prevent imports of fresh avocados from Mexico, which has a much larger avocado industry and lower labor, water, and land costs. One argument it used successfully until 1997, when importation was finally allowed, was that allowing Mexican avocados into the United States would spread crop disease. After 1997, lower costs of production in Mexico forced California growers to lower wages to become competitive.

== Programs ==
The organization is based in Irvine, California. Among its initiatives are advertising, public relations, defending growers from effects of importation of avocados from Mexico, compiling and disseminating industry news and information, lobbying, research on growing and production, and policing groves from "avocado rustlers" who steal fruit.

Revenues vary from $10–20 million per year (they vary with industry income).

== See also ==
- California Avocado Society
- Calavo Growers
