= Tracy L. Kahn =

American botanist

Tracy Lynn Kahn
- Citizenship: US
- Education: University of California, Riverside
- Scientific career
- Fields: Biology (Botany)

Tracy Lynn Kahn is a citrus scientist, that currently serves as the 11th curator of University of California, Riverside Citrus Variety Collection since 1995, succeeding her master Willard Paul Bitters.

== Education & degree ==
Kahn earned her B.S. degree on Botany from the University of Michigan and her Ph.D. degree on botany from the University of California, Riverside in 1987. She is also a researcher, using the collection to evaluate the commercial potential of new varieties.

== Scholarly work ==
- Citrus Variety Evaluation for Trueness-to-Type and Commercial Potential by Tracy Kahn (2008)
- Tried and True or Something New? A catalog of new fruits relative to the old ones, by Toni Siebert and Tracy Kahn
- A quantitative and structural comparison of Citrus pollen tube development in cross-compatible and self-incompatible gynoecia by Tracy L. Kahn and Darleen A. DeMason
- Characterization of Expression of Drought- and Abcisic Acid-Regulated Tomato Genes in the Drought-Resistant Species Lycopersion pennellii be Tracy L. Kahn, Susan E. Fender, Elizabeth A. Bray, and Mary A. O'Connell
