= James E. Bacon (rancher) =

American avocado horticulturist (1909–1997)

James Edward Bacon
- Born: July 13, 1909; Buena Park, California, U.S.
- Died: September 11, 1997; Fullerton, California, U.S.
- Occupations: Rancher, horticulturist
- Spouse: Virgie Maude Hill (m. 1948)

James Edward Bacon (July 13, 1909 – September 11, 1997) was an American horticulturist and rancher. He was the developer of the 'Bacon' Avocado and 'Jim' Avocado varieties, and worked to screen avocado trees for cold hardiness in Buena Park, California, by growing hundreds of Mexican and hybrid seedlings. He has been called "the world's first genuine avocado breeder".

== Life and career ==
James Bacon was born on July 13, 1909, in the Bacon House at Buena Park, California. His parents were Agatha and Robert Bacon. Their family home was moved to the Buena Park Historic District in 1994, and turned into a museum.

The 'Bacon' avocado was a seedling planted and selected by Bacon around 1928. It was registered with the California Avocado Society in 1948.

In 1985, Bacon and his wife donated USD $53,000 to the Fullerton Arboretum in Fullerton, California, calling it "a worthwhile recipient", by creating an endowment to "provide monies to assist in the operational and education activities of the arboretum."
