= Melogold =

Citrus fruit and plant

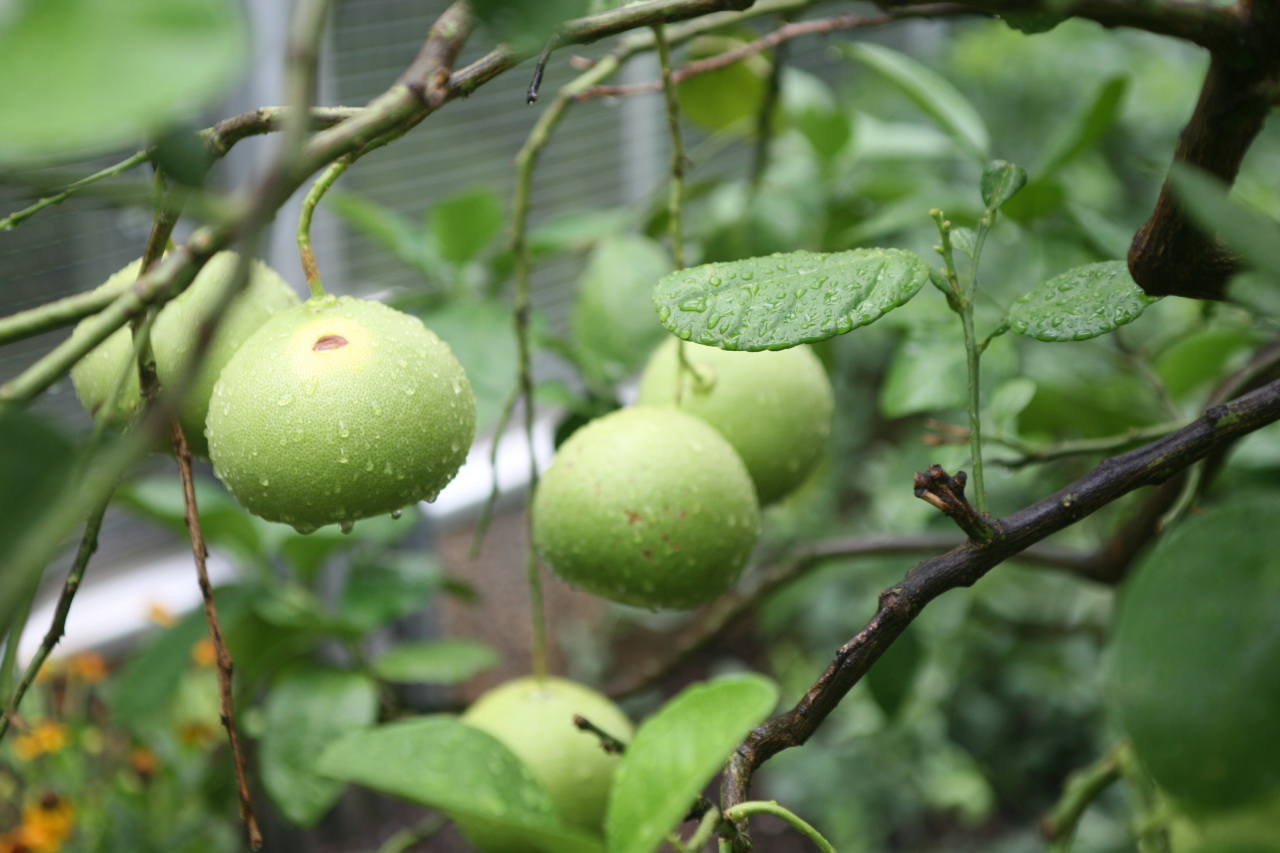
- Melogold in growth
- Hybrid parentage: Citrus grandis × C. Paradisi/Citrus maxima/Citrus grandis
- Cultivar: Melogold
- Origin: University of California, Riverside

The Melogold or Melogold grapefruit (Citrus grandis Osbeck × C. Paradisi Macf.) is a citrus hybrid similar to the oroblanco; both result from a cross between the pomelo and the grapefruit and is a fruit similar to a sweet grapefruit.

== Motivation ==
The intent was to obtain a grapefruit-like cross that is less bitter or acidic than grapefruit, instead achieving sweetness similar to the pomelo. It was to be smaller than the pomelo, and more flavourful, with characteristics linked to the grapefruit. The breeders intentionally used a tetraploid grapefruit and a diploid pomelo, with triploid progeny and seedless.

== Characteristics ==
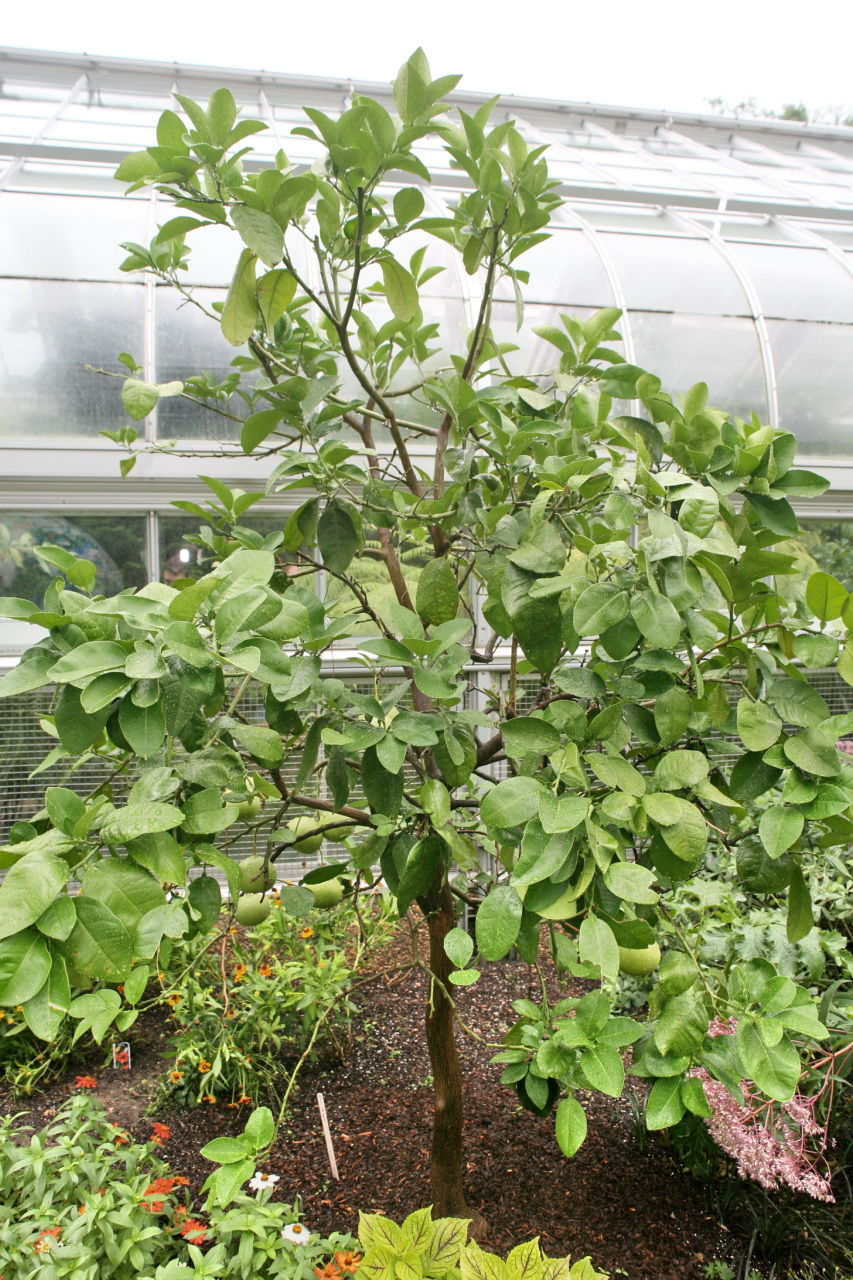
A Melogold citrus tree

Similar to oroblanco, Melogold can be eaten with a grapefruit spoon, or peeled as an orange. They turn from green to yellow during ripening.

Melogold was once said to be preferred as a cash crop over oroblanco, since melogold has thinner skin, which is preferred by consumers.

Exterior peel color is slower to develop than in Marsh grapefruit, but late in the season is comparable. Exterior peel texture is smooth to slightly pebbled. Average peel thickness is slightly greater than Marsh, but as a percentage of fruit diameter is equal to Marsh and thinner than Oroblanco; interior color and texture are the same as Oroblanco. As with Oroblanco the central core hollow is greater than Marsh at maturity. The flesh is tender and juicy, separating well from the segment membranes. Percent juice has been equal to Marsh and slightly higher than Oroblanco.

== History ==
In 1958, Robert K. Soost and James W. Cameron crossed CRC 2240 (pomelo) with a seedy, white, tetraploid grapefruit. Two of the triploid offspring had particularly favorable characteristics. One was released in 1980 as 'Oroblanco'. The second was released as Melogold. Oroblanco was more similar to grapefruit, while Melogold was more similar to pomelo.

Melogold was much larger than Marsh grapefruit and Oroblanco at all test locations. Weight at Riverside from 1967 through 1975 averaged 470 grams for Melogold, 360 grams for Oroblanco and 280 grams for Marsh.
