= Chip on shoulder =

English-language expression

To have a chip on one's shoulder is to hold a grudge or grievance that readily provokes disputation.

== History ==
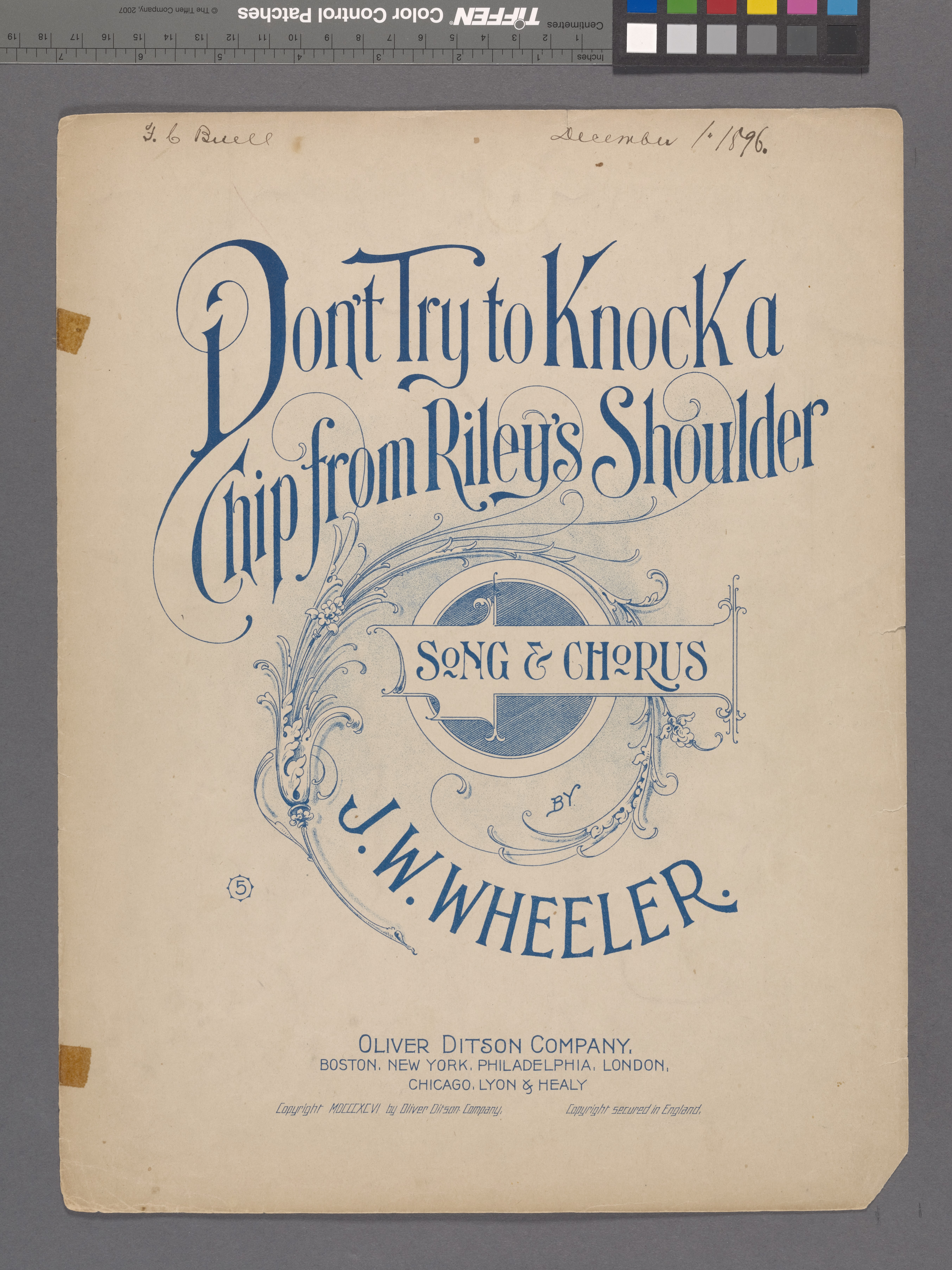
Cover of sheet music for the song titled: "Don't Try to Knock a Chip from Riley's Shoulder." (J. W. Wheeler) which alludes to the expression.

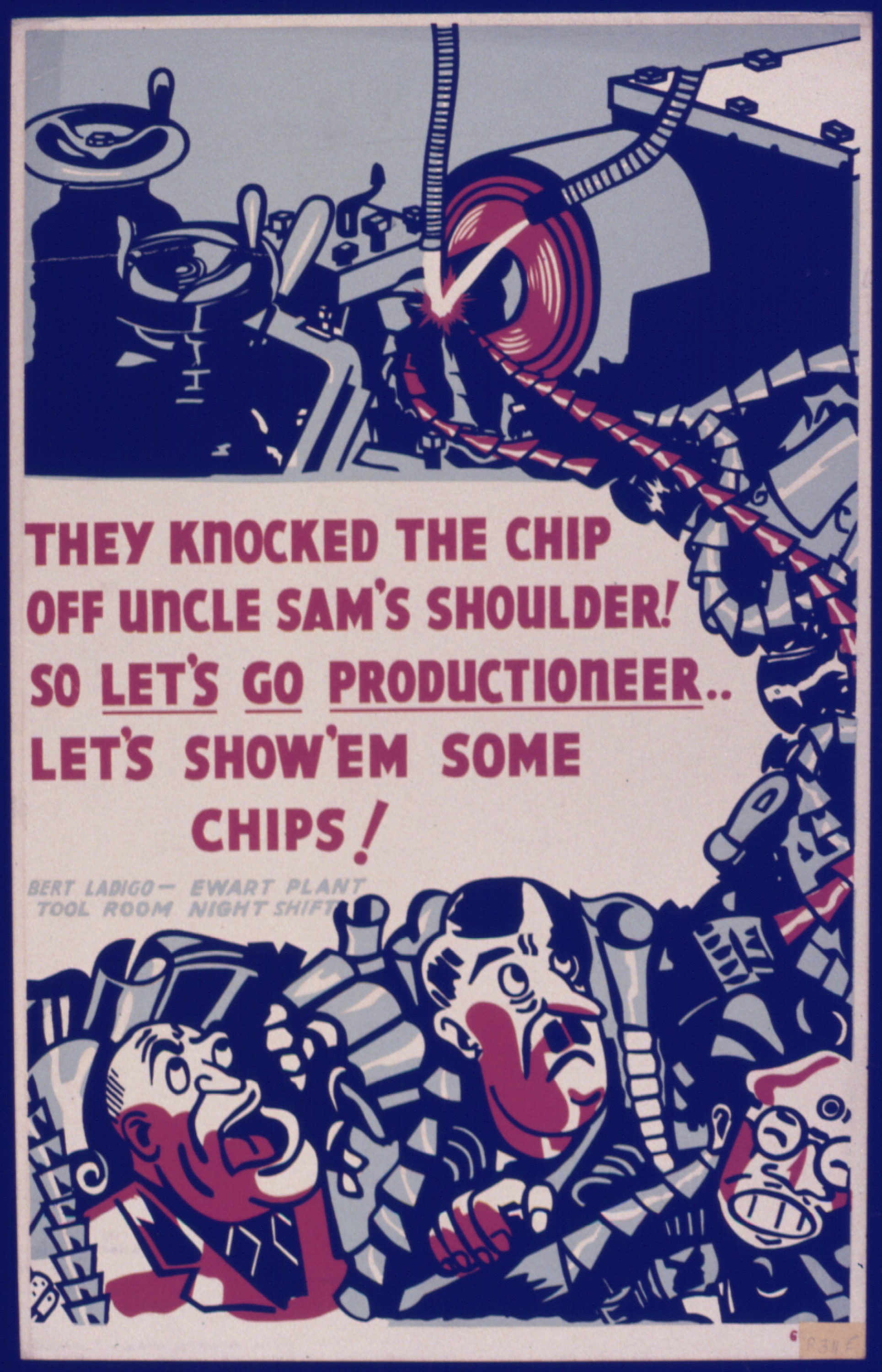
An American wartime poster alluding to the expression.

This idiom traces its roots back to a custom that was known in North America since the early 19th century. There is an 1817 reference by James Kirke Paulding to "The boyish custom of knocking a chip off the shoulder". The New York newspaper Long Island Telegraph reported on 20 May 1830 "when two churlish boys were determined to fight, a chip [of wood] would be placed on the shoulder of one, and the other demanded to knock it off at his peril". A similar notion is mentioned in the issue of the Onondaga Standard of Syracuse, New York on 8 December 1830: "'He waylay me', said I, 'the mean sneaking fellow—I am only afraid that he will sue me for damages. Oh! if I only could get him to knock a chip off my shoulder, and so get round the law, I would give him one of the soundest thrashings he ever had'."

Some time later in 1855, the phrase "chip on his shoulder" appeared in the Weekly Oregonian, stating "Leland, in his last issue, struts out with a chip on his shoulder, and dares Bush to knock it off". In American author Mark Twain's 1898 manuscript of Schoolhouse Hill, character Tom Sawyer states his knowledge of the phrase and custom when he says, "[I]f you want your fuss, and can't wait till recess, which is regular, go at it right and fair; put a chip on your shoulder and dare him to knock it off."

In Canada, the custom is well described at St. Peter Claver's Indian Residential School for Ojibway boys in the town of Spanish, Ontario:

By custom, the challenger, usually one of the intermediates, anxious to prove his worth or avenge some wrong, would deliberately seek out his foe with a wood chip or flat stone on his shoulder, placed there either by his own hand or by that of somebody else.

The challenger might further provoke his opponent by issuing a dare for him to knock off the chip. The opponent might then display his bravery and contempt by brushing the cheek of the challenger lightly as he did so. In more formal cases, a second might take the chip and present the chip to his man who would then place it on his own shoulder. The boys would then square off and fistfight like boxers.
