= California Avocado Society =

US non-profit organization

- Company type: Incentive Corporation Limited
- Industry: Non profit organization
- Founded: 1915; Southern California
- Headquarters: Southern California

The California Avocado Society is a non-profit organization based in Southern California that provides access to information on cultural, marketing, research and governmental issues for growers in the business of raising avocados. The society was founded in 1915 under the name of California Avocado Association, and changed name to the present one in 1941.

== Services ==
The Society arranges seminars and annual meetings for educational purposes, as well as to create new contacts between the growers, marketers and the professionals. In 2015 was the hundredth anniversary of the society, and also was the hundredth annual meeting. To this day they also publish their annual yearbook, that is provided free for paid members. There is also an e-mail publication named The Weekly Newsline that is provided for members.

== Notable associates ==
- James E. Bacon – active member
- John Eliot Coit − served as president of the association in 1915 and again from 1923 to 1947, and served as president three terms.
- Herbert John Webber − took an active part in the organization of the Society in 1915, served as director 1915 to 1920; as President in 1916, and again as director from 1935 to 1937.
- Robert Willard Hodgson − received the Award of Honor by the Society, in 1940.
- William A. Spinks − supplied for the association propagation material from the avocado variety that he invented.

== See also ==
- California Avocado Commission
- Calavo Growers
- List of countries by avocado production
