= Calavo Growers =

International consumer goods and farm products company

Calavo Growers Inc.
- Type: Public
- Traded as: Nasdaq: CVGW
- Industry: Agricultural Food Products
- Founded: 1924; 102 years ago
- Headquarters: 1141 Cummings Rd, Santa Paula, CA 93060, United States
- Key people: John Lindeman (CEO and chairman of the board)
- Revenue: ▲$1.08 billion (2017)
- Number of employees: 1,848 (As of 2014)
- Website: calavo.com

Calavo Growers, Inc., is an international consumer goods and farm products company. It packages, and distributes avocados and other fruits, as well as their fresh prepared food to restaurants, stores, and individual customers worldwide.

Based in Santa Paula, California, its avocado production is cultivated throughout the state of California, as well as in South and Central America.

Calavo Growers was established in 1924 as an agricultural cooperative and was instrumental in launching the California avocado industry. In 2013, the firm was listed on Forbes' America's Best Small Company list.

== History ==
Calavo Growers, Inc., was founded on January 21, 1924, as the California Avocado Growers' Exchange. Due to overwhelming interest in the avocado, many California growers had planted avocado seeds that had originated in Mexico. Although slow to mature, by 1923, those avocado trees were producing a large enough crop to be marketed. The problem was the lack of a marketing outlet. The founders studied grower cooperatives that were doing well at the time, such as the California Fruit Growers Exchange, and adopted features that would work best for the avocado industry. In the first year, the California Avocado Growers Exchange packed the 18,000 lbs. of fruit that launched the California avocado industry. Shortly after, the growers exchange adopted the name Calavo as a brand. This was the result of a naming contest in which multiple entries were submitted combining the words "California" and "avocado". Calavo quickly became the brand name of high quality avocados. In the early 1930s, the cooperative increased its offerings to include limes, coconuts, kiwis, mangos and persimmons. Papayas were added in the late 1940s.

The California Avocado Advisory board was created in 1961; Calavo played a key role in its creation and development. The purpose was to market the Californian avocado industry as a whole and not just the avocado growers in the cooperative. Today it is known as the California Avocado Commission.

After 78 years as a growers cooperative, Calavo members voted to take the company public. In 2002, Calavo Growers Inc. was designated the ticker symbol CVGW on the NASDAQ National Market System. The seats on the company's board of directors were filled mainly with longtime avocado growers, and that remains so today.

Until 2024, it operated its business through three divisions including Fresh Products, Calavo Foods and Renaissance Food Group (RFG). On August 15 of the same year, the RFG division was sold to F&S Fresh Foods for $83 million.

In January 2026, Mission Produce announced it would acquire Calavo in a ~$483 million cash and stock deal.

== Products ==
Calavo Growers markets fresh avocados grown in California, Mexico, and Chile. Additionally, it distributes other fruit products, such as tomatoes, pineapples and Hawaiian produced papayas. Operations in Mexico pack and ship fresh avocados from their 50,000 sq. ft. packinghouse, while a second 90,000 sq.ft. facility prepares and packages fresh avocado products, such as guacamole. Their products are distributed throughout the U.S. to retailers and foodservice operations nationwide, as well as Canada, Europe and Asia.

== See also ==
- California Avocado Society
