= Oroblanco =

Cross between pomelo and grapefruit

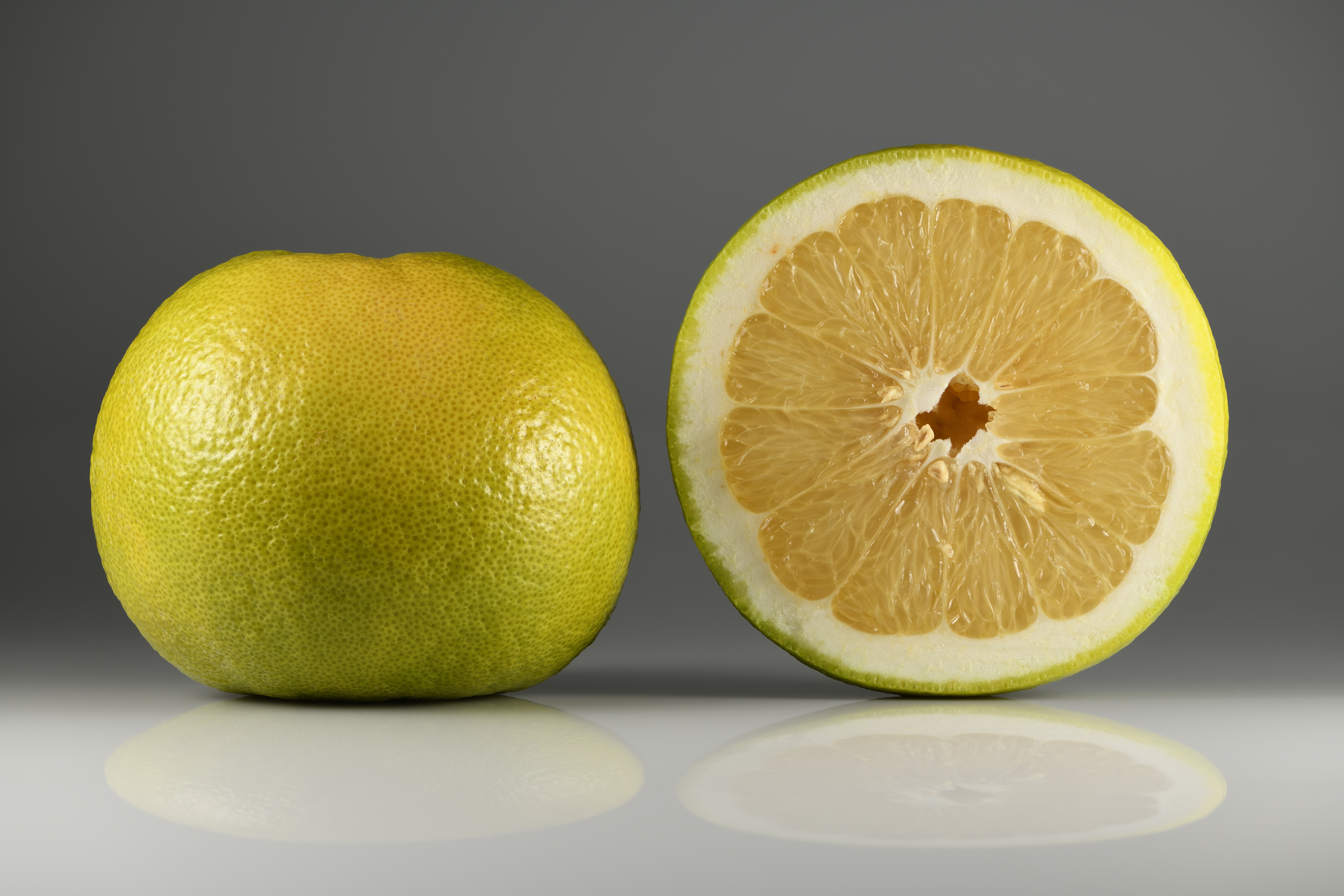
- Hybrid parentage: Citrus grandis Osbeck × Citrus paradisi Macf.
- Cultivar: Oroblanco
- Origin: University of California Riverside

The oroblanco, oro blanco, or sweetie (Citrus grandis Osbeck × C. paradisi Macf.) is a citrus hybrid, resulting from a cross between an acidless pomelo and a Marsh grapefruit. Its fruit is oblate and mostly seedless, with a thick rind that remains green long after it has already matured. It has a sweet, mild taste, and lacks the bitterness generally associated with grapefruit. It requires less heat to grow than other varieties of grapefruit and are harvestable sooner. Oroblancos grown in moderate climates tend to yield the highest-quality fruit.

The hybrid was first created by two geneticists at the University of California, Riverside, James W. Cameron and Robert Soost, in April 1958. It was later released to growers in 1980, who rapidly adopted it. It initially struggled in American markets, but had a resurgence in popularity after growers in Israel began advertising its sweet taste and green color to consumers in Japan, China, and Southeast Asia. It was exported to growers in Australia in 1990, where it was also commercially unsuccessful.

== Description ==
=== Characteristics ===
The oroblanco is a triploid citrus hybrid, resulting from a cross between an acidless pomelo (C. grandis Osbeck) and the Marsh grapefruit (C. paradisi Macf.). Its fruit is seedless with pale yellow flesh and is slightly less juicy than other grapefruits, though it does have a juice content of roughly thirty percent. Rarely, it contains small, aborted seeds. It has a thick, smooth peel which is very slow to transition from green to yellow; in fact, the rind only turns yellow weeks after the fruit has already matured. A consequence of its thicker rind is less edible flesh. It has a thick white pith and a large hollow core, and is oblate. Once mature, the fruit weigh roughly 400–500 grams (14–18 oz), and have a diameter of about 9 centimetres (3.5 in). A 2020 study found that the fruit retained many of the compounds found in grapefruit including terpenes and polyphenols.

=== Flavor ===
The flavor of the oroblanco is mild and sweet. As it descends from an acidless pomelo, it lacks the bitterness generally associated with grapefruit, although it does attain an acidic aftertaste if grown in colder environments, or if eaten earlier in the growing season. Its rind and membrane also possess a bitter taste due to their naringin content. The fruit's Brix/acid ratio, which contrasts a fruit's levels of sweetness and acidity, is considerably higher than those of other grapefruit varieties; in California, it is required to have a ratio of at least 10:1. By comparison, Marsh grapefruit tested in Australia were found to have a ratio of 4.5:1. Its aroma is "citrusy" and "floral".

=== Harvest ===
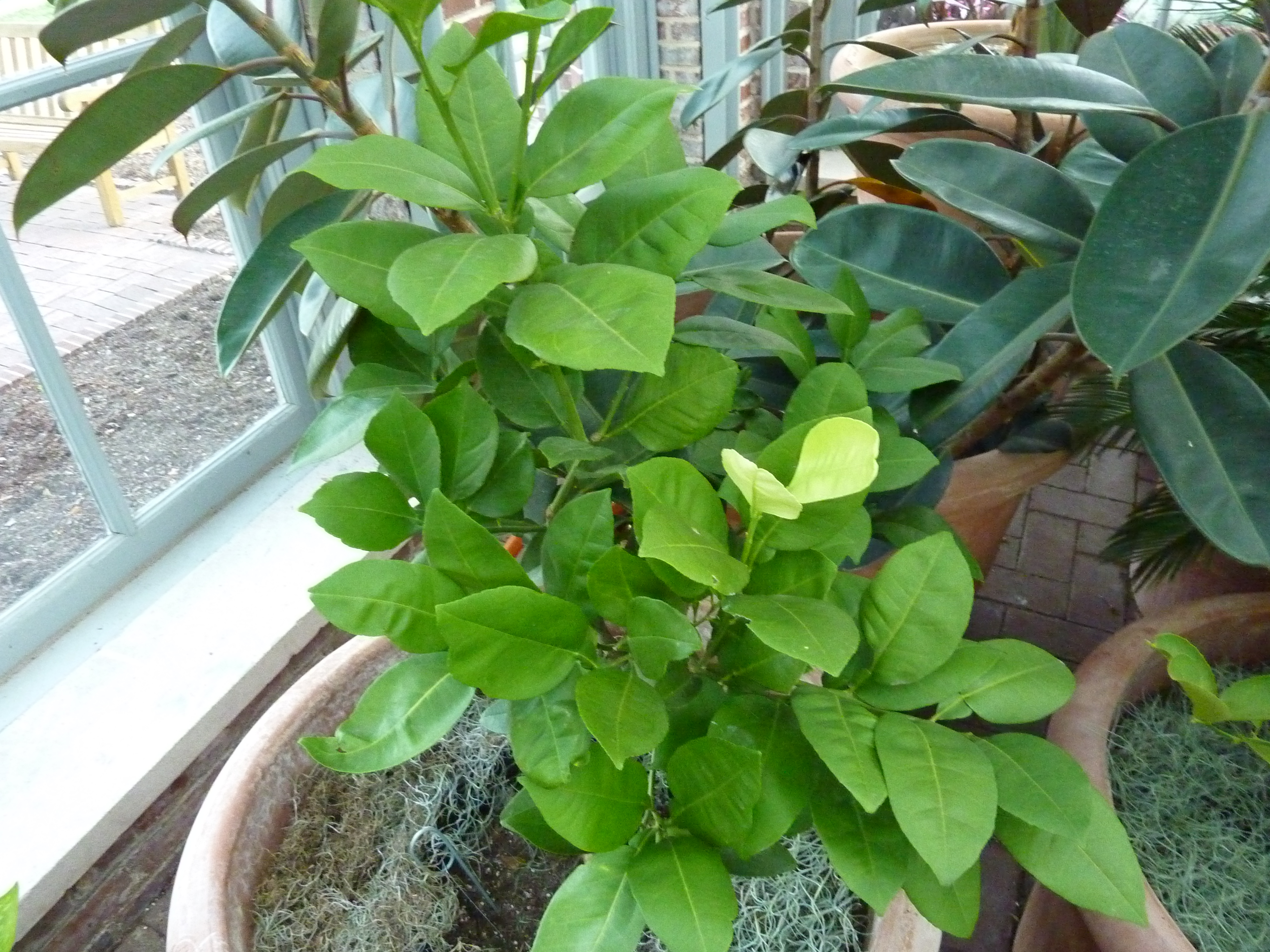
Juvenile oroblanco tree, Missouri Botanical Gardens

Prior to its release, researchers planted oroblanco trees in a mild climate, a cold and humid climate, and a desert climate to analyze its production in different settings. They found that the specimens produced in the hotter climate were of a lower quality, and that those in the colder climate were excessively acidic. They thus determined that mild, inland climates were optimal for oroblanco growth. The oroblanco needs less heat than a standard grapefruit to sweeten and are harvestable sooner than other grapefruit varieties. Oroblancos have been cultivated in California, Florida, Israel, and Australia. In California, their harvest season can last from late November to March. In Australia, where they are grown in the temperate, subtropical, and tropical zones, harvest can last anywhere from February to December, depending on the region and how much heat is received. Its yield size may vary; during seasons of heavier yields, the average size of the fruit decreases.

The tree of the oroblanco quickly grows tall and spreads outward, requiring an allowance of more than 20 feet horizontally when cultivated, and usually begins to yield fruit within five years of being planted. It is susceptible to citrus tristeza virus; a common symptom of CTV in oroblancos is stem-pitting, which stunts tree growth and leads to fruit of small size and low quality. It is also susceptible to fruit fly infestations.

== History ==
The oroblanco was first created as the result of a cross between an acidless pomelo (C. grandis Osbeck) and the Marsh grapefruit (C. paradisi Macf.) carried out in April 1958 by Robert Soost and James W. Cameron, geneticists at the University of California, Riverside. The cross resulted in seven cultivars, of which six were triploids and one was a tetraploid. In 1962, these seven cultivars were planted in fields in Riverside; later, trees were also planted at research stations in Exeter, Santa Ana, and the Coachella Valley to test its production in differing climates. Of the cultivars planted, one labelled 6C26,20 was selected and designated "oroblanco", meaning "white gold" in Spanish. The oroblanco was commercially released to growers in 1980, with the patent belonging to the Regents of the University of California. A separate cultivar from Soost and Cameron's cross in 1958 was also released under the name "melogold" in 1986.

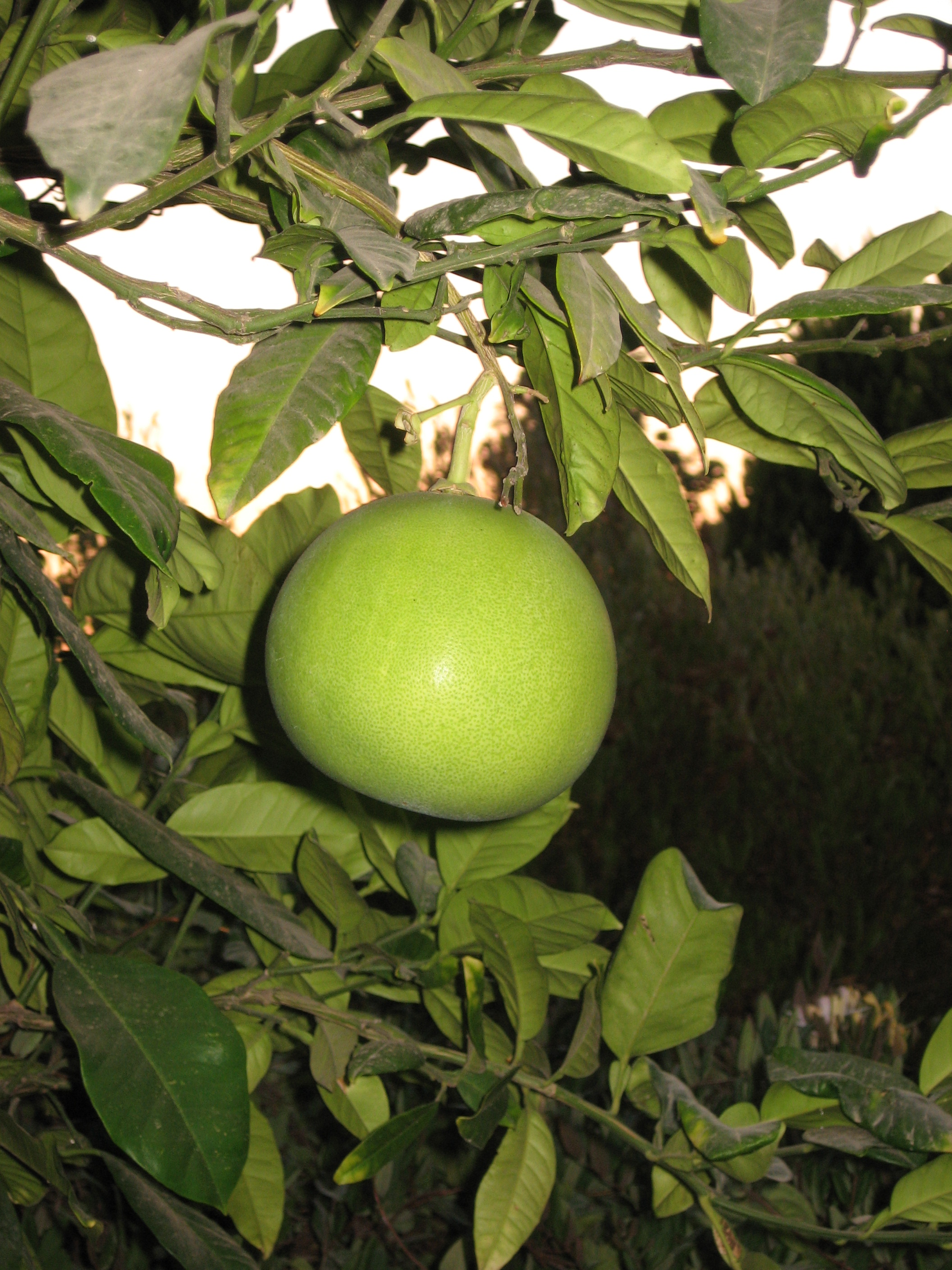
Oroblanco on the branch

Following its release, the oroblanco was rapidly adopted by growers. However, it proved unpopular in American markets due to its thick peel, which is slow to transition from green to yellow, leading consumers to believe it was still unripe. Many of the trees planted were removed or had different grapefruit varieties grafted onto them. It was exported to Australian growers in 1990 and released there the same year, distributed by the Australian Nurserymen’s Fruit Improvement Company. It failed to gain popularity there as well, leading to many of those trees being removed.

The oroblanco later saw a resurgence in popularity after growers in Israel began growing the fruit. After branding the fruits "Sweeties" and "Golden Sweeties" and advertising their green peels and sweet flavor, Israeli growers found a large market of buyers for the oroblanco in Japan, where it became a success. Exports of the fruit from Israel and Australia to Southeast Asia also started around the same time. This led to a renewal of the tree's cultivation in the United States, with trees being planted in California and Florida. Israel also found buyers for oroblancos in China; 3,000 tons of the fruit were exported there by Israel in 2018. Regardless, oroblanco yield still trails behind that of the more popular Marsh grapefruit, and despite its resurgence, it continues to decrease in popularity in California, falling from 1,105 acres of oroblancos in 2004 to 233 acres in 2024, a decline of nearly 79 percent.
