= Robert Willard Hodgson =

American agronomist

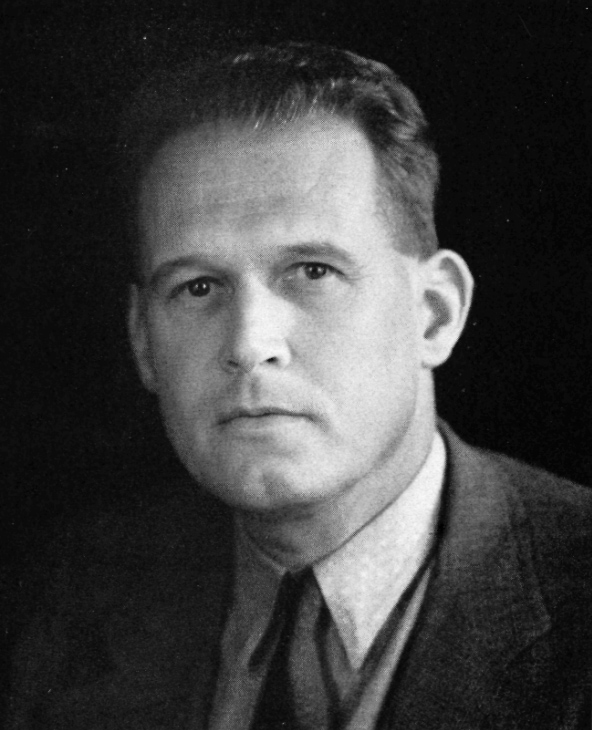
- Born: April 3, 1893; Dallas, Texas, US
- Died: May 16 (or 17), 1966 (aged 73); Los Angeles, California, US
- Known for: Research on Citrus, Avocado and other subtropical and tropical crops
- Spouse: Evelyn Mitchell Hodgson
- Children: Robert Willard Hodgson Jr., and Richard Warren Hodgson
- Scientific career
- Fields: Horticulture
- Institutions: University of California

Robert Willard Hodgson (1893–1966) was an American botanist, taxonomist and agricultural researcher located in the California State, an exceptional citrus and avocado expert. He was a co-author of The Citrus Industry book, emeritus professor of University of California, and dean of the College of Agriculture.
