= Herbert John Webber =

American botanist (1865–1946)

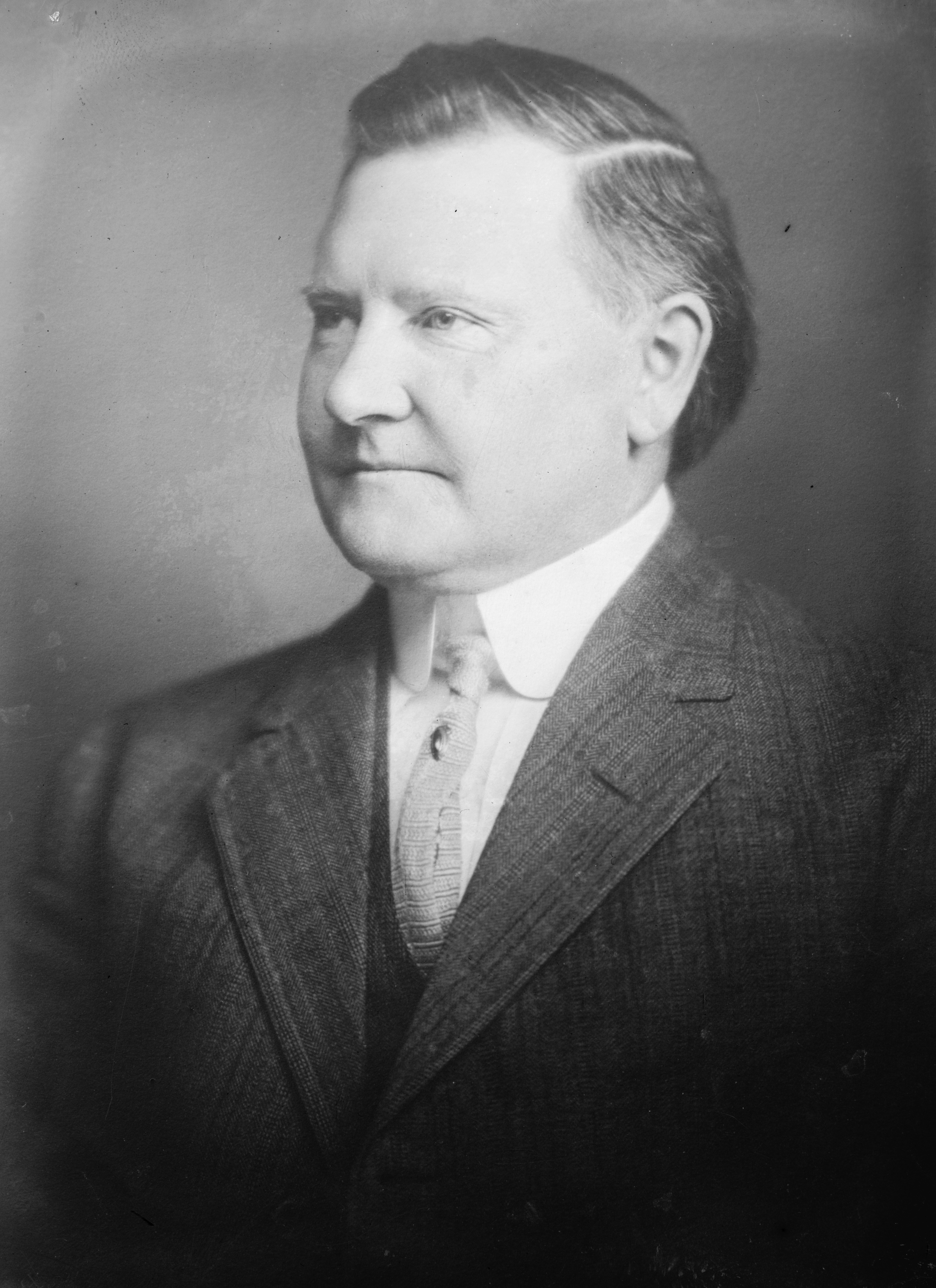
- Born: December 27, 1865; Lawton, Michigan
- Died: January 18, 1946 (aged 80); Riverside, California
- Education: B.S University of Nebraska (1889): MA University of Nebraska (1890); PhD Washington University in St. Louis (1900)
- Spouse: Lucene Anna Hardin
- Children: Eugene Frances (Webber) Morrison, Fera Ella (Webber) Shear, Herbert Earl Webber, and John Milton Webber
- Awards: California Avocado Society Emblem of Honor (1938)
- Scientific career
- Notable students: Leon Dexter Batchelor, Harry H. Love
- Author abbrev. (botany): Webber

Herbert John Webber (December 27, 1865 – January 18, 1946) was an American plant physiologist, professor emeritus of sub-tropical horticulture, first director of the University of California Citrus Experiment Station, and the third curator of the University of California Citrus Variety Collection. Webber was the author of several publications on horticulture, member of numerous professional horticultural and agricultural associations. He coined the word "clone" in 1903 and was the first to use it to describe a colony of organisms derived asexually from a single progenitor.

== Early life ==
Webber was born in Lawton, Michigan, on December 27, 1865, the only child of John Milton Webber and Rebecca Ann Bradt. In 1867, the family moved west to Marshalltown, Iowa, where they would remain for the next fifteen years before moving on to Lincoln, Nebraska, in 1883.

Webber attended Willow Hill School followed by the Albion Seminary for his primary school education. He obtained his Bachelor of Science degree in 1889, and his master's degree in 1890 from the University of Nebraska. In 1900, he received his Ph.D. from Washington University in St. Louis.

== Professional life ==
Beginning in 1892, Webber worked for the United States Department of Agriculture Bureau of Plant Industry in Florida where he investigated orange diseases and from 1889 to 1907 had charge of the department's plant-breeding investigations. In 1898 Webber represented the USDA in London at the International Conference on Hybridization.

In 1907 Webber, then considered the "most notable plant breeder and botanist in the USDA," was hired by Liberty Hyde Bailey, dean of Cornell University's New York State College of Agriculture, to serve as professor of experimental plant biology director of the school’s Department of Plant Breeding. Bailey often left Webber in charge of the college while Bailey participated in conferences away from Ithaca before appointing Webber as acting dean in 1910. While at Cornell Webber stressed biological research with a particular focus on both genetics and breeding. He was a partner in the development of several cultivars including Cornell 1777 Timothy grass, Honor Winter Wheat, Cornell Welcome Spring Oats, Weber's Early Dent O.P. Corn, Cornell 11 and 12 Corn, In 1912 Webber went to the University of California to be director of the Citrus Experiment Station, dean of the Graduate School of Tropical Agriculture, and professor of plant breeding. Webber was one of the advocates in 1913 of keeping the station in Riverside rather than re-locating the facility to the San Fernando Valley. Together with Walter Tennyson Swingle he originated citranges, a hardy citrus fruit, by hybridization. In 1915 Webber joined the California Avocado Society, serving as director twice and president once. During 1920 Webber took a sabbatical from University of California to serve as general manager of South Carolina-based Coker Pedigreed Seed Company only to return to the Citrus Experimentation Station the following year. He retired as director of the Experimentation Station in 1929 and retired from teaching in 1936. In 1939, he and Leon Dexter Batchelor discovered an orange cultivar, Olinda Valencia, in Southern California. Webber was a founding member of the Los Angeles Farm Bureau.

Webber had been a member of the American Association for the Advancement of Science, the American Botanical Society, the American Society of Naturalists, the Society of Horticultural Science, the American Genetic Association, and the Ecological Society of America, as well as academic societies Sigma Xi, Alpha Zeta, and Kappa Delta Rho.

== Publications ==
Webber wrote some 263 publications. He was a contributor and worked on the editorial board of The Citrus Industry. The book has been called the “bible of citrus growers.”

- "Some facts concerning the New York State College of Agriculture at Cornell University. Presented to a hearing of legislative committees". Albany, New York. April 5, 1910 – via Archive.org.
- Webber, Herbert J. (1912). "The effect of research in genetics on the art of breeding". Science. 35 (903): 597–609. Bibcode:1912Sci....35..597W. doi:10.1126/science.35.903.597. hdl:2027/uc2.ark:/13960/t0js9j72t. PMID 17754830. S2CID 5901423 – via Archive.org.

== Awards and recognition ==
Webber was awarded a Doctor of Agriculture degree from the University of Nebraska in 1913 and a Doctor of Laws degree from the University of California in 1943. Webber Hall, a life sciences building on University of California, Riverside, was named in his honor.

== Person life ==
On September 8, 1890, Webber married Lucene Anna Hardin. The couple had four children. Webber died in Riverside, California on January 18, 1946.
