= University of California Citrus Experiment Station =

Agricultural research unit in Riverside, California

Coordinates: 33.97°N 117.34°W

The University of California Citrus Experiment Station is the founding unit of the University of California, Riverside campus in Riverside, California, United States. The station contributed greatly to the cultivation of the orange and the overall agriculture industry in California. Established February 14, 1907, the station celebrated its 100th anniversary in 2007.

== The University of California Citrus Experiment Station ==
=== The Rubidoux Laboratory ===
The Southern California "citrus belt" developed rapidly in the 1870s after experimental navel orange plantings were conducted in Riverside, using cuttings introduced from Bahia, Brazil. Within two decades commercial orange groves stretched eastward from Pasadena to Redlands beneath the foothills of the San Gabriel and San Bernardino mountains. A citrus grower named John Henry Reed is credited with first proposing a state-funded scientific experiment station specifically for citrus research in Southern California, and organized a vigorous lobbying effort of the local citrus industry towards that end. As founding member and chair of the Riverside Horticultural Club's experimental committee, he also pioneered a collaborative approach to conducting experimental plantings, and published more than 150 semitechnical and popular papers on citrus and other subjects between 1895 and 1915.

Riverside California State Assembly member Miguel Estudillo worked with Reed and a committee of the Riverside Chamber of Commerce to draft Assembly Bill 552, which provided for a pathological laboratory and branch experiment station in Southern California. On March 18, 1905, a legislative board of commissioners was appropriated $30,000 to select the site and implement the measure. On February 14, 1907, the University of California Regents established the UC Citrus Experiment Station (CES) on 23 acres (93,000 m^{2}) of land on the east slope of Mount Rubidoux in Riverside. However, the University's decision to concentrate on the development of the University Farm in Davis led to only one scientist among two initial staff being assigned to the CES. Dubbed the Rubidoux Laboratory, the initial purpose of the station was to concentrate on various soil management problems such as fertilization, irrigation, and improvement of crops.

=== Expansion and relocation to Box Springs ===
When you think about it, it's amazing the industry survived at all. Without the Citrus Experiment Station, it probably would not have been possible.

— Lowell N. Lewis, former associate dean of UCR

In 1913, a record killing freeze caused a panic throughout the $175 million Southern California citrus industry, which demanded more state-funded agricultural research. Three acts of the California Legislature in 1913 provided $185,000 to fund an enlarged Citrus Experiment Station to be located in one of the eight southern counties. Developers of the San Fernando Valley, recently opened for settlement by the 1914 completion of the Owens Valley aqueduct, lobbied intensively for the CES to be relocated there. Herbert John Webber, professor of plant breeding and the newly appointed CES director from Cornell University, considered various site proposals but ultimately worked with Riverside officials and local growers to assist in drafting and endorsing a proposal for the station to be relocated to its current site on 475 acres (1.92 km^{2}) of land 2.5 miles (4.0 km) from downtown Riverside, adjacent to the Box Springs Mountains. On December 14, 1914, the UC Regents approved the selection, news of which caused jubilation in downtown Riverside: "The entire city turned into the streets, the steam whistle on the electrical plant blew for 15 minutes, and the Mission Inn bells were rung in celebration." It was, according to Reed as quoted in the Riverside Daily Press: "...the most important day that has occurred in all the history of Riverside."

The new station was to be governed autonomously under Webber's direction. He spent the next few years personally recruiting the founding research team, eleven scientists organized into six divisions of agricultural chemistry, plant physiology, plant pathology, entomology, plant breeding, and orchard management. Webber also initiated the development of the Citrus Variety Collection on 5 acres (20,000 m^{2}) planted with approximately 500 species of citrus from around the world, which grew to become the greatest such variety collection internationally. He also planted hundreds of other subtropical crops, including 70 varieties of avocado, imported from Mexico, that produced more than 45,000 hybrids through controlled pollination. (He also engaged in agricultural extension activities by founding the California Avocado Association in 1914, and by organizing the annual citrus institute of the National Orange Show in San Bernardino and the Date Growers Institute of Coachella Valley.)

The original laboratory, farm, and residence buildings on the Box Springs site were designed by Lester H. Hibbard of Los Angeles, a graduate of the University of California School of Architecture, in association with a colleague, H.B. Cody. Built at a cost of $165,000, the architecture followed the Mission style suggesting the Spanish colonial heritage of Southern California. The site, which became the early nucleus of the UCR campus, eventually opened in 1917, although the Division of Agricultural Chemistry continued to occupy lab space at the Rubidoux site. (The Rubidoux site is today occupied by the UC Center for Water Resources.)

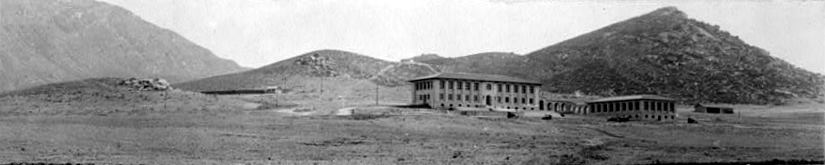
Citrus Experiment Station, circa 1916

=== Research achievements during the Webber Administration ===
Webber's tenure as director of the CES lasted, with a few interruptions, from 1913 until his retirement in 1929. A few important achievements of the CES during his directorship were: Walter P. Kelly's development of drainage techniques for reclaiming thousands of acres of California land made unproductive by salt accumulation; the development of chemical fertilizers; the discovery of boron poisoning, methods for its control, and an understanding of the necessity of minute amounts of boron in citrus growth. Howard B. Frost's pioneering genetic research lead to the first accurate reports of the normal number of chromosomes for some citrus, the first discovery of polyploidy in citrus, and the first descriptions of citrus tetraploids. Frost also developed tools for guiding artificial hybridization for production of new citrus cultivars, which resulted in widespread propagation of nuclear lines and contributed to the improvement of citrus plantings throughout the world. By working out the etiology of various types of diseases, particularly gummosis, Howard S. Faucet contributed significantly to improved methods for disease control and made possible the discovery of the viral nature of some diseases which were responsible for causing quick decline among 3 million orange trees over a 25-year period. H.J. Quale's entomological research on citrus insects, mites, and walnut insects led to the first recognition of the problem of insect resistance to fumigation, and of means of overcoming it. Harry H. Smith and Harold Compere's discovery of natural parasites of the citrophilus mealybug in Australia effected almost complete control of this parasite in California, which saved growers in Orange County almost $1 million in crop losses annually. Although its major emphasis was on citrus, the CES also made research contributions to every major crop grown in Southern California.

== The Citrus Research Center and Agricultural Experiment Station ==
After Webber retired in 1929, Leon Dexter Batchelor became the second director of the CES. Under his direction, the land, capital facilities, and operating budget expanded significantly, and the station moved into several new areas of agricultural science, including statistics and experimental plot design, herbicides to reduce weeds, and the first studies of the effects of air pollution on crops. It was during this time that the station battled a mutation of Citrus tristeza virus, resulting in some 9000 trees (87% of the station's orchards) being destroyed in order to contain the outbreak. After Batchelor retired in 1951, Alfred M. Boyce became the new director, and the CES entered another period of growth as agricultural production in Southern California boomed after World War II. The old divisional structure was replaced along departmental lines, and five new departments were added, including the nation's first department of nematology. A committee on air pollution research was also developed in 1953.

When the Citrus Experiment Station celebrated its fiftieth anniversary, it had grown considerably in size and stature with several new buildings and a wider range of horticultural research conducted with more acres for experimental plantings. The laboratory's original two staff personnel increased to 265 personnel by 1957. The lab itself had become famous throughout the citrus industry. In 1961, to reflect the growth of the laboratory, the name was changed to the Citrus Research Center and Agricultural Experiment Station (CES-AES). At the time, the director was Alfred M. Boyce for which Boyce Hall, the home to the Entomology and Biochemistry Departments, is named. In 1968 Boyce was succeeded by W. Mack Dugger until 1981 when Irwin W. Sherman was named the fifth director of the station.

=== Successive development ===
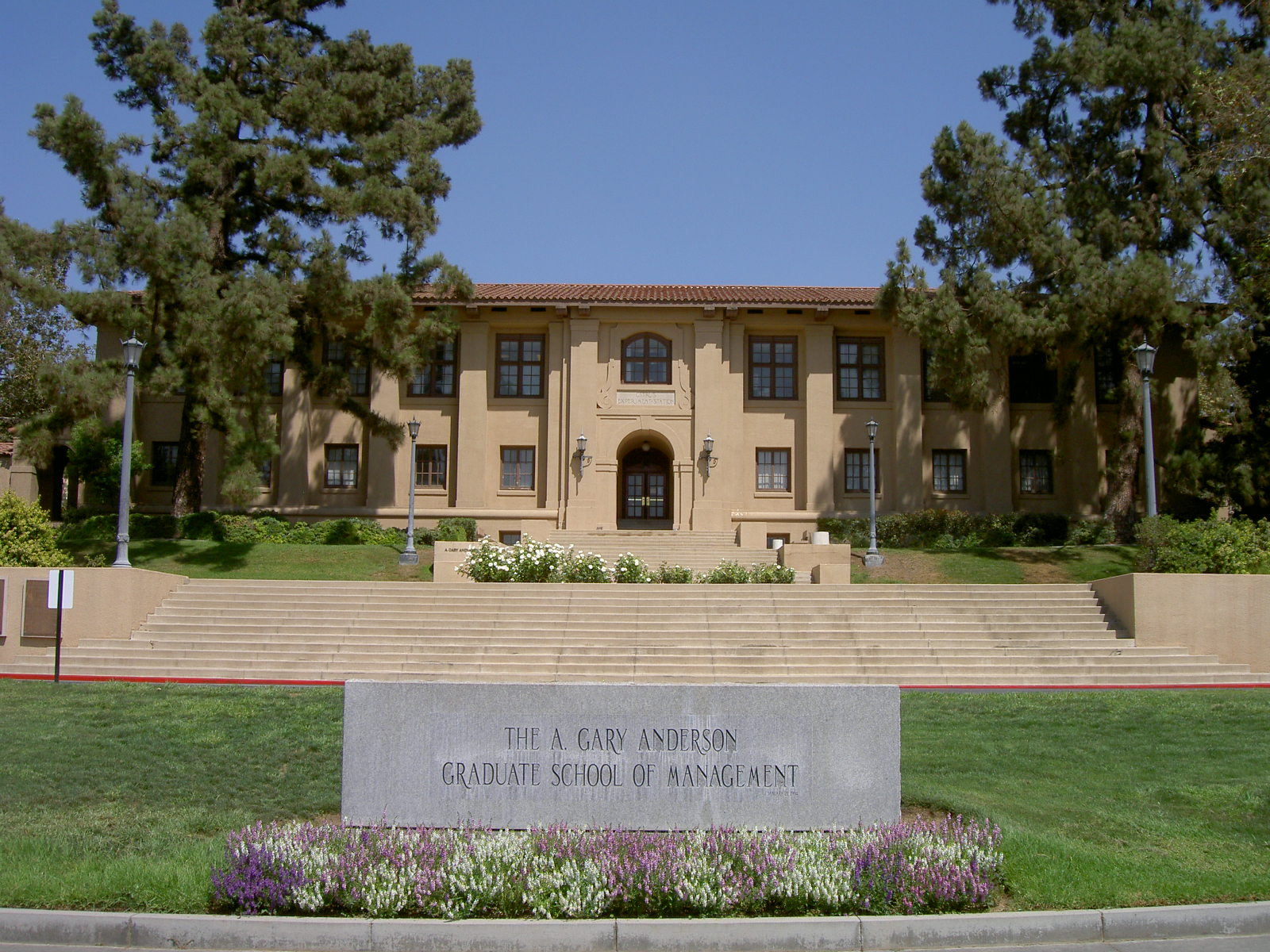
The original 1917 structure of the UC Citrus Experiment Station now houses the A. Gary Anderson Graduate School of Management.

In the 1970s, research at the station incorporated new scientific disciplines and techniques such as molecular biology and genetics. Environmental protection along with agriculture in arid and semiarid regions became new focus areas. New crops were developed, including turfgrass varieties with tolerance to soil salinity and air pollution. Biological control and integrated pest management remained robust areas of research. In one case, the importation and establishment of a tiny stingless wasp brought the ash whitefly, which caused millions of dollars in damage to agriculture and also despoiled cars, under control. It was a case that brought widespread attention to Citrus Experiment Station research.

The last quarter-century has also seen the release of several patented new varieties of citrus, starting with the 'Oroblanco' grapefruit in 1981 and continuing with the recent release of the 'Tango' mandarin. Another breeding program has yielded cowpea lines that are early-maturing and heat-tolerant, making them particularly well-suited to the drought conditions of West Africa, helping to reduce hunger and poverty there.

Today, the CES-AES is operated by Agricultural Operations, a support department of the College of Natural and Agricultural Sciences at UCR. In addition to the original 420-acre (1.7 km^{2}) CES-AES, the department also oversees the 540-acre (2.2 km^{2}) Coachella Valley Agricultural Research Station, located about 80 miles (130 km) southeast of campus, in a desert environment near the Salton Sea. (Acquired in 1991 to mitigate the loss of agricultural lands on the UCR main campus due to development.) On the two stations, over 50 crops are grown for research including citrus, avocado, turfgrass, asparagus, date palms, vegetables, small grain, alfalfa, and ornamentals.

=== Collections ===
There is one active collection, the Citrus Variety Collection, still operated and maintained under the CES-AES. Currently, the Citrus Variety Collection occupies 22.3 acres on the UCR campus and 2 acres at the South Coast Research and Extension Center in Irvine, California, and 2 acres at the UC Riverside Coachella Valley Agricultural Research Station in Thermal, California. At any given time, the Citrus Variety Collection contains two trees of approximately 1000 types within the genus Citrus and many of the over 30 related genera, encompassing virtually all of the commercially important and historic citrus varieties of the world.

The University of California, Riverside Libraries are now home to the literature collections of the former Citrus Experiment Station Library as well as substantial archives containing historical and administrative documents from the Station. A sampling of historical materials and rare books from Special Collections are represented in the online Citrus Experiment Station Centennial Exhibition on the UCR Libraries website.

In 1924, Philip Hunter Timberlake was appointed Associate Entomologist in the Department of Biological Control at the Citrus Experiment Station, where he served until retirement in 1950. His insect collection contained about 500,000 specimens of which about 150,000 were Hymenoptera, including what was once the largest bee collection in North America, and this served as the foundation for the collection now housed in the University of California's Entomology Research Museum, containing some 4 million total specimens.

=== UC Riverside Highlanders Ag/Ops Course ===
The Ag/Ops Course is the home course for the UC Riverside Highlanders men's and women's cross country teams.

== See also ==
- Kinnow - a mandarin hybrid very popular in Punjab region, bred by Howard B. Frost at the Experiment Station
- Oroblanco and Melogold - sweet grapefruit hybrids, bred by Robert Soost and James W. Cameron at the Experiment Station
