= American Society for Horticultural Science =

Scientific society for horticulture

The American Society for Horticultural Science (ASHS) is a professional society for horticultural science based in Alexandria, Virginia. Founded in 1903, the mission of ASHS is to promote and encourage national and international interest in scientific research and education in horticulture in all its branches. The more than 4800 ASHS members in all 50 states and 60 countries around the world fulfill this mission by sharing the results of their research, teaching, extension, and community engagement activities with their colleagues and humankind the world over.

The members of ASHS are researchers, teachers, industry leaders, extension educators, and graduate and undergraduate students. They work at universities, in government, and in industry. They provide the research that keeps the production of our horticultural crops (ex. fruit, nut, vegetable, turf, and ornamental crops) competitive and allows them to be raised sustainably. They help rural economies develop and institute profitable horticultural production methods. They educate and train the critical employees needed by industry and translate the latest fundamental research into products and practices that improve our health, communities, and environment.

== Publications ==
ASHS publishes three peer-reviewed open access science publications.

Journal of the American Society for Horticultural Science

The primary mission is to publish accurate, clear, reproducible, and unbiased articles in the field of fundamental horticultural science. JASHS seeks to advance selected papers in horticultural science encompassing original discovery through analysis, compilation, formulation, and synthesis of concepts, data, ideas, observations, and theories formulated with the primary goal of answering a question.

Scientific queries published in JASHS are limited to advances in knowledge associated with high-value specialty crop species and their components or products. The research published in JASHS is usually undertaken without a specific product being considered, developed, or tested. The resulting contribution of knowledge is generally not yet ready for any practical application; however, it may be a prerequisite for subsequent problem solving or product development efforts.

HortScience

The primary mission is to publish accurate, clear, reproducible, and unbiased articles in the field of applied horticultural research. HortScience seeks to advance selected papers in horticultural research derived from original efforts in design, engineering, exploration, and preliminary testing of new methods, processes, products, protocols, techniques, and technologies formulated with the primary goal of solving a problem.

The research studies published in HortScience are limited to advances in knowledge derived from high-value specialty crops and their components or products. HortScience seeks to publish the results of problem-solving research, typically conducted on a small-scale basis, in controlled environments or in limited trials. Generally, the results are not considered ready for direct utilization by practitioners, without additional evaluation efforts in larger-scale development trials. HortScience also publishes Cultivar and Germplasm Releases.

HortTechnology

The primary mission is to publish accurate, clear, reproducible, and unbiased articles in the field of practical horticultural science. HortTechnology seeks to advance selected peer-reviewed papers derived from topics in practical horticultural investigations with the primary goal of improving capabilities of horticultural practitioners and students, or recommending best practices for horticultural operations, or advancing knowledge concerning the intrinsic social benefits associated with the intersection of humanity and horticulture.

The research investigations published in HortTechnology are limited to advances in knowledge derived from or associated with high-value specialty crops and their components or products. HortTechnology seeks to publish the results of comparative and evaluation research, typically conducted in real-world applications, and/or in classroom, field, or greenhouse environments on a large enough scale to support recommendations to practitioners. Generally, the results are ready for direct utilization by educators, growers, practitioners, and technical advisors.

== Annual conference ==
The ASHS Annual Conference is a showcase for the latest advances in science and technology related to horticulture and specialty crops. The Conference brings together researchers, scientists, industry, academia, government, and students to cultivate ideas and share new techniques. The Conference focuses on the distribution of science through technical sessions, oral and poster presentations, keynote speakers, interactive workshops, special topic sessions and an overarching themed colloquium.

== Professional interest groups ==
Professional Interest Groups are composed of members sharing interests in special horticultural science areas or activities.

The objectives of most ASHS Professional Interest Groups include the following.

- To promote interaction between and among the research, extension, teaching, and industry components of horticultural science.
- To provide a forum for the development, discussion, exchange, sharing, or dissemination of ideas, information, or materials via approved workshops, symposia, contributed paper sessions, discussion groups, business meetings, field trips, regional and national meetings.
- To promote, encourage, facilitate, or coordinate basic and applied research and education by identifying critical needs, developing methods and procedures, or preparing proposals.
- To promote liaison or good working relationships with other organizations with similar interests.
- To educate the public.
- To encourage recruitment of young scientists.
- To recognize outstanding contributions.

== See also ==
- American Horticultural Society (AHS)
