= Leon Dexter Batchelor =

American horticulture professor

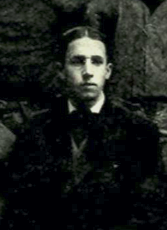
- Batchelor in December 1906
- Born: May 8, 1884; Upton, Massachusetts, U.S.
- Died: March 21, 1958 (aged 73); Riverside, California, U.S.
- Education: B.S New Hampshire College of Agriculture and Mechanical Arts (1907): Ph.D Cornell University (1911)
- Organizations: American Association for the Advancement of Science: American Society of Horticultural Science; Alpha Zeta

Leon Dexter Batchelor (May 8, 1884 – March 21, 1958) was an American horticulture professor. He was the longest-serving director of the University of California Citrus Experiment Station.

== Early life and education ==
Batchelor was born in 1884 and grew up on a New England farm in Upton, Massachusetts. He attended the New Hampshire College of Agriculture and the Mechanic Arts, as did his older brother, chemist Harry David Batchelor (class of 1903). Both were members of Kappa Sigma. Batchelor also served as a cadet in the college's Reserve Officers' Training Corps Battalion, and was student manager of the 1906 New Hampshire football team. He earned his Bachelor of Science degree in 1907. He then attended Cornell University and earned his Doctor of Philosophy in 1911.

== Career ==
Batchelor taught horticulture at Cornell University from 1907 to 1910 and resigned to teach at Utah Agricultural College. While teaching at Utah, Batchelor published studies about thinning apple orchards. In 1915, he joined the University of California Citrus Experiment Station as an Associate Professor of Plant Breeding. Batchelor was promoted to Professor of Orchard Management in 1919 and to director of the Citrus Experimentation Station in 1929 to replace retiring director Herbert John Webber.

Batchelor became a preeminent authority within California on the study of walnuts. He was named by the state director of agriculture in 1940 as the seventh member of the California Walnut Control Board. Batchelor remained director of the Citrus Experimentation Station until July 1, 1951, when he returned to research. Batchelor was selected as the University of California, Riverside's Faculty Research Lecturer for 1954. Batchelor Hall on UC Riverside's campus is named after Batchelor, the longest-serving director of the Citrus Experimentation Station.

== Selected published works ==
- "Classification of the Peony". Cornell University Agricultural Experimentation Station of the College of Agriculture. Cornell University: 223–229. May 1910.
- Irrigation of Peaches. Utah Agricultural Experiment Station. January 1916.
- Winter injury to young walnut trees during 1921-1922. University of California. 1922 – via Archive.org.
- Walnut culture in California. University of California. 1924 – via Archive.org.
- —; Reuther, Walter; Webber, Herbert John, eds. (1943). The Citrus industry. USAIN State and Local Literature Preservation Project, California. Vol. 1. University of California. ISBN 9780931876028. OCLC 624111334.
- Walnut production in California. University of California. 1945 – via Archive.org.
