= Robert Soost =

American citrus expert (1920–2009)

Robert K. Soost (November 13, 1920, Sacramento – March 8, 2009) was a citrus expert and professor of genetics at University of California, Riverside, and sixth curator of the University of California Citrus Variety Collection.

He studied at UC Berkeley.

Soost worked to develop important citrus varieties, including two noted grapefruits (the Oroblanco and the Melogold at that university's citrus experiment station in Riverside, California.) as well as two noted mandarins. Was a co-author of volume II of The Citrus Industry (book).

On March 8, 2009, the professor died from a heart attack.
