= List of Missouri University of Science and Technology faculty =

The faculty of Missouri University of Science and Technology include professors, coaches, chancellors, and other staff associated with the Missouri University of Science and Technology, as well as faculty employed under its former names, the University of Missouri–Rolla and the Missouri School of Mines and Metallurgy.

== Professors and teaching staff ==
Name	Department	Notability	References
James William Abert	Civil, Architectural, and Environmental Engineering	Major, U.S. Army, professor of civil engineering, applied mathematics, and engineering drawing (1872–1877), topographical engineer in the U.S. Army Corps of Topographical Engineers during the Mexican–American War, Seminole Wars, and American Civil War	
Thomas Akers	Mathematics and Statistics	Math instructor (1999–2010), former NASA astronaut and veteran of four Space Shuttle flights including flights on Discovery and Endeavour, retired Air Force colonel	
Eugene Thomas Allen	Chemistry	Chemistry professor (1895–1901), pioneer in the field of geochemistry and key member of the Geophysical Laboratory of the Carnegie Institution for Science	
Alexander Animalu	Physics	Assistant professor of physics (1968–1970), awarded the Nigerian National Order of Merit Award in 2000, known for research with solar energy and superconductivity	
Daniel W. Armstrong	Chemistry	Professor of chemistry (1989–2000), known for work in chiral resolution and authored over 740 publications	
Estella Atekwana	Geosciences and Geological and Petroleum Engineering	Adjunct professor of geology (2003–2007), dean of the UC Davis College of Letters and Science (2021–present)	
Nolan B. Aughenbaugh	Geosciences and Geological and Petroleum Engineering	Professor of geological engineering (1966–1983), known for conducting research in Antarctica, Aughenbaugh Peak is named after him	
S. N. Balakrishnan	Mechanical and Aerospace Engineering	Professor of aerospace engineering (1985–2021), chancellor of Shiv Nadar University (2014–2018)	
Romesh Batra	Mechanical and Aerospace Engineering	Professor of applied mechanics (1976–1994), professor of engineering science and mechanics at Virginia Tech (1994–present), authored one of the leading continuum mechanics textbooks	
Abdeldjelil Belarbi	Civil, Architectural, and Environmental Engineering	Professor of civil engineering (1991–2009), known for work with reinforced concrete and prestressed concrete	
Ida A. Bengtson	Chemical and Biochemical Engineering	Lecturer in bacteriology and overseer of the Trachoma Hospital in Rolla (1924–1931), first woman hired to work in the United States Public Health Service's Hygienic Laboratory at the National Institutes of Health	
Maggie Cheng	Computer Science	Professor of computer science (2003–2016), director for the Center for Interdisciplinary Scientific Computation (CISC) at the Illinois Institute of Technology (2018–present)	
Sajal K. Das	Computer Science	Professor (2013–present) and department chair (2013–2017) of computer science, named a fellow of the Institute of Electrical and Electronics Engineers for his work with parallel computing and distributed computing	
Delbert Day	Materials Science and Engineering	Curators' Professor Emeritus of Ceramic Engineering, conducted the first U.S. glass melting experiments in micro-gravity on NASA's Space Shuttle, the Delbert Day Cancer Institute in Rolla, Missouri is named after him	
Frank Dennie	Mathematics and Statistics	Associate professor of mathematics (1931–1951), athletic director (1909–1912, 1915–1928), head football coach (1909–1912, 1915–1917)	
Michael Dorff	Mathematics and Statistics	Associate professor of mathematics (1997–2000), founded the Center for Undergraduate Research in Mathematics	
William Holding Echols	Mining and Explosives Engineering	Professor of mining engineering (circa 1883–1888), director of Missouri School of Mines and Metallurgy (1888–1889)	
Tomlinson Fort Jr.	Chemistry / Chemical and Biochemical Engineering	Professor of chemistry and chemical engineering (1980–1982), provost (1980–1982), head of the chemical engineering departments at Carnegie Mellon University and Vanderbilt University	
Donald L. Frizzell	Geosciences and Geological and Petroleum Engineering	Professor of paleontology and stratigraphy (1948–1952), known for research on otoliths in the Gulf Coast of the United States	
David C. Geary	Psychological Science	Assistant professor of psychology (1987–1989), known for research in cognitive development and evolutionary psychology	
N. Katherine Hayles	English and Technical Communication	Assistant professor of English (1982–1985), faculty director of the Electronic Literature Organization (2001–2006), known for work in postmodern literature	
Emerson C. Itschner	Military Science	Lieutenant general, U.S. Army, professor of military science and military tactics (1934–1936), Chief of Engineers (1956–1961)	
John Kieffer	Mathematics and Statistics	Professor of mathematics (1970–1986), professor of electrical and computer engineering at University of Minnesota (1986–2011), known for work in information theory	
John C. McManus	History and Political Science	U.S. military historian, author of several books, received the 2012 Governor's Award for Excellence in Teaching	
A. L. McRae	Physics	Professor of physics (1891–1894, 1899–1915), director of Missouri School of Mines and Metallurgy (1915–1920), head football coach (1893)	
Francisca Oboh-Ikuenobe	Geosciences and Geological and Petroleum Engineering	Geologist specializing in palynology and sedimentology, director of the Association for Women Geoscientists (2005–2008), member of the International Geoscience Programme (IGCP) Scientific Board	
Daniel Oerther	Civil, Architectural, and Environmental Engineering	Professor of environmental health engineering best known for the use of 16S ribosomal RNA-targeted techniques and community-based participatory research, Jefferson Science Fellow with the U.S. Department of State supporting the Feed the Future Initiative and the Global Food Security Act of 2016	
Anthony Joseph Penico	Mathematics and Statistics	Professor of mathematics (1966–1986), known for the Penico theorem, Penico solvability, and Penico series	
David Pommerenke	Electrical and Computer Engineering	Professor of electrical and computer engineering (2001–2019), named a fellow of the Institute of Electrical and Electronics Engineers for his work with system-level electrostatic discharge technology	
Yihong Qi	Electrical and Computer Engineering	Adjunct professor of electrical and computer engineering, fellow of the Canadian Academy of Engineering, named a fellow of the National Academy of Inventors in 2019	
Thomas L. Rubey	Psychological Science	Professor of psychology, history, and grammar (1891–1898), lieutenant governor of Missouri (1903–1905), U.S. representative from Missouri (1911–1921, 1923–1928)	
Jagannathan Sarangapani	Electrical and Computer Engineering	Professor of electrical and computer engineering (2001–present), named a fellow of the Institute of Electrical and Electronics Engineers for his work with adaptive control and neural network control	
R. Nelson Smith	Chemistry	Instructor of chemistry (1942–1945), mentored M. Frederick Hawthorne, known for research with colloids	
Jay Switzer	Chemistry	Curators' Professor Emeritus of Chemistry, known for research with electroplating	
Paul Worsey	Mining and Explosives Engineering	Professor Emeritus of mining engineering, associate chair of the explosives engineering department, host on the Discovery Channel series The Detonators (2009)	
Donald Wunsch	Electrical and Computer Engineering	Professor of computer engineering, named a fellow of the Institute of Electrical and Electronics Engineers for his work with hardware implementations, reinforcement, and unsupervised learning	
Wei-Wen Yu	Civil engineering	Professor of civil engineering, named the Curators' Distinguished Professor in 1982	
Yahong Zheng	Electrical and Computer Engineering	Professor of electrical engineering, named a fellow of the Institute of Electrical and Electronics Engineers for her work with wireless communications	

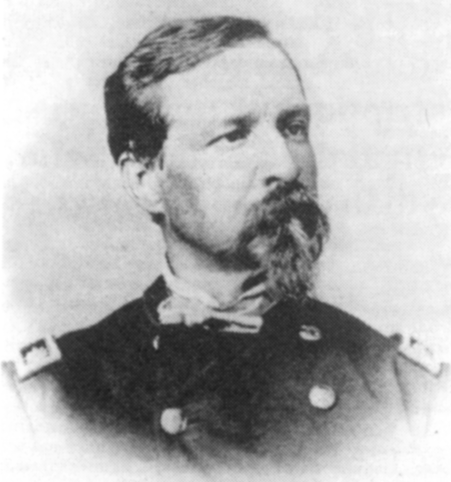
James William Abert

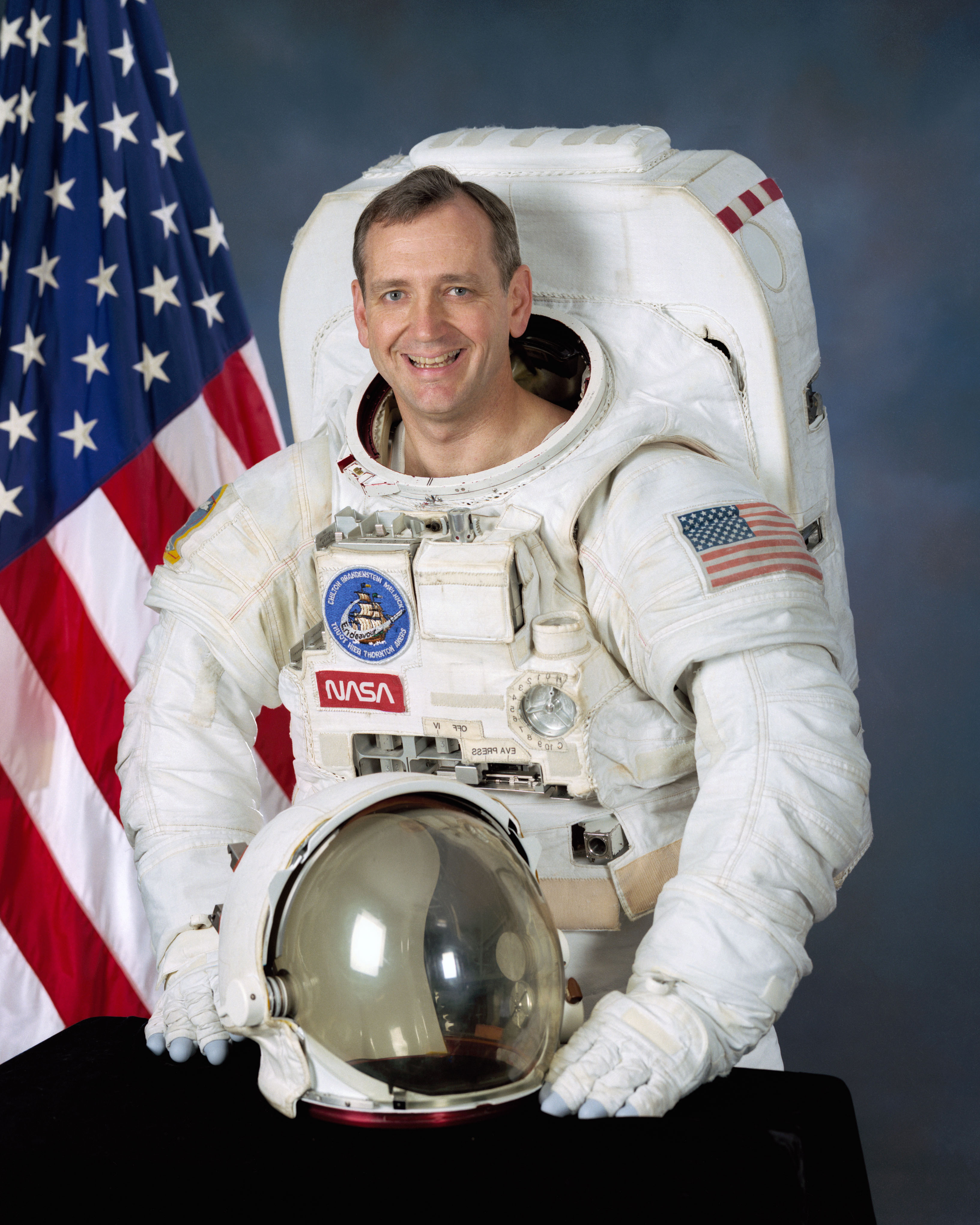
Thomas Akers

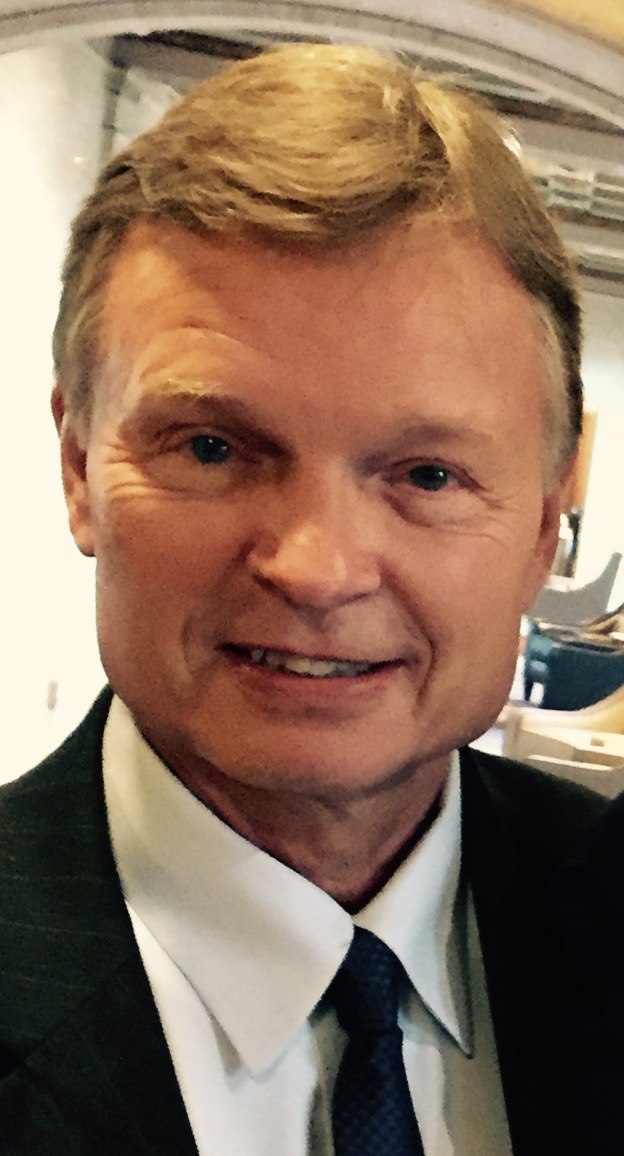
Daniel W. Armstrong

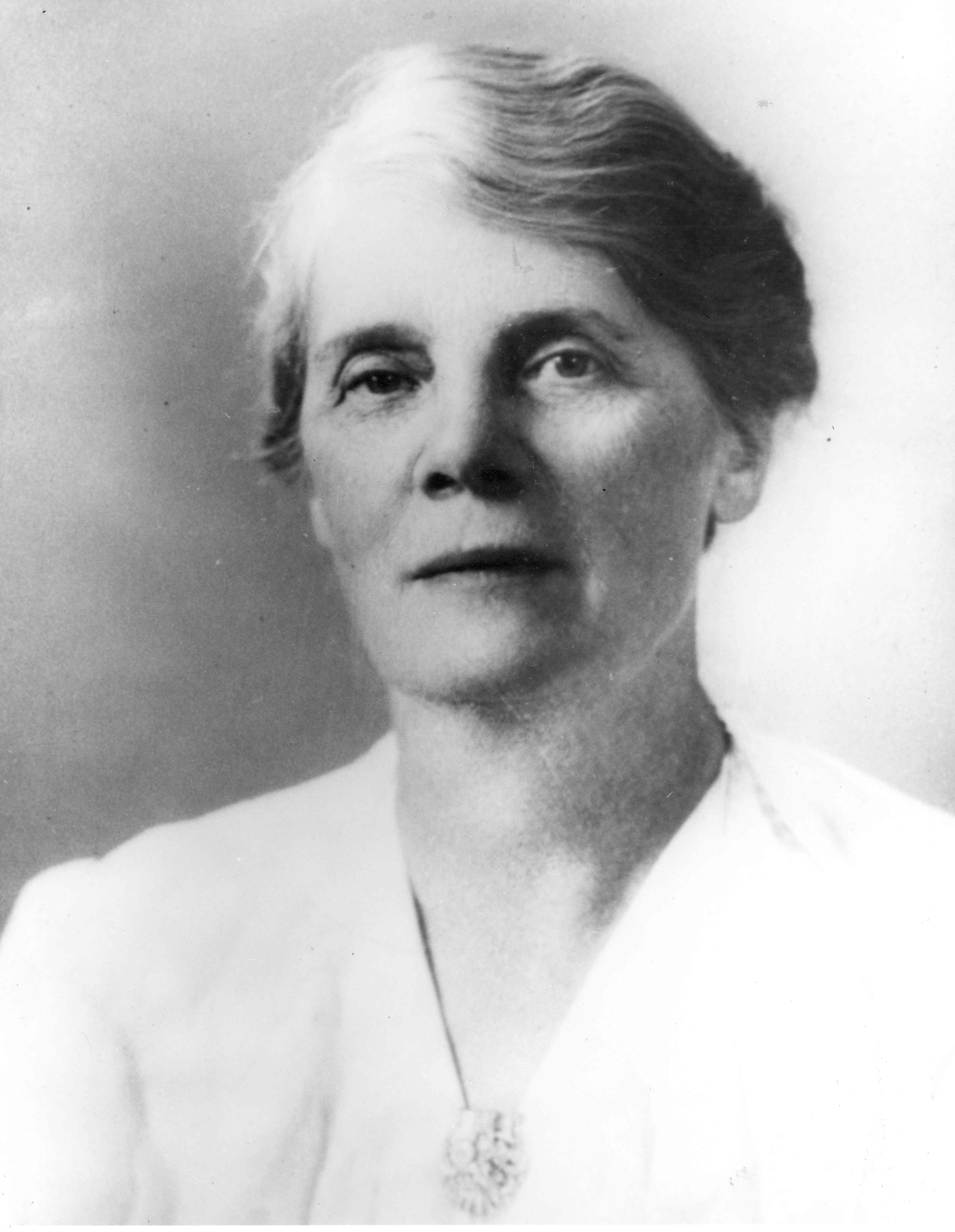
Ida A. Bengston

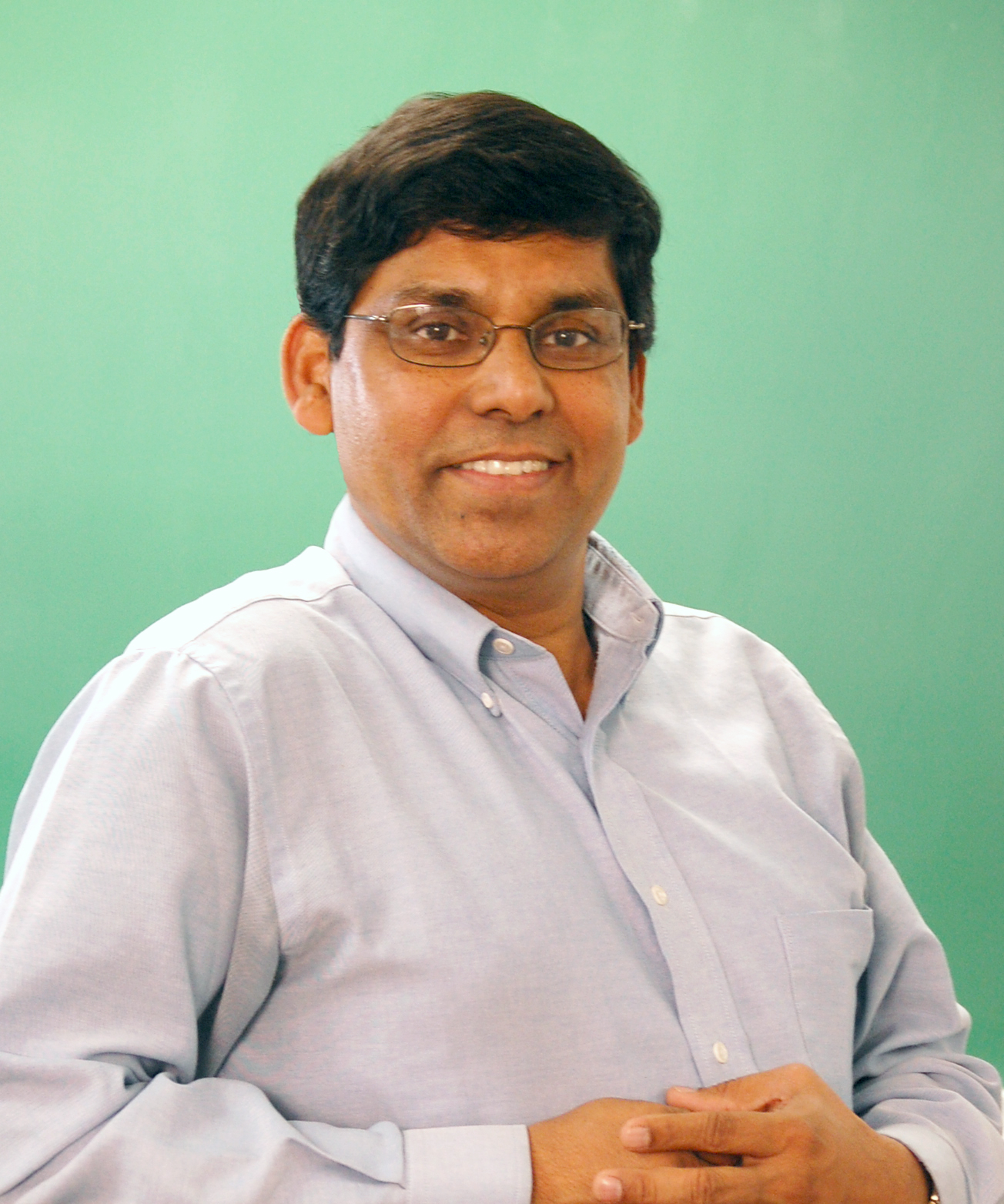
Sajal K. Das

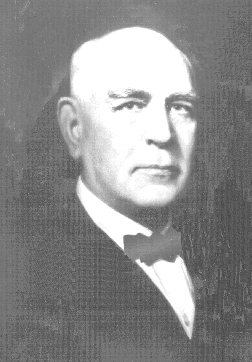
William Holding Echols

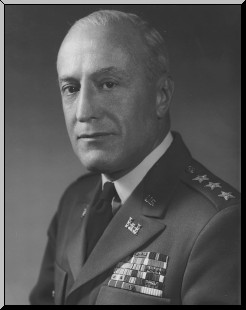
Emerson C. Itschner

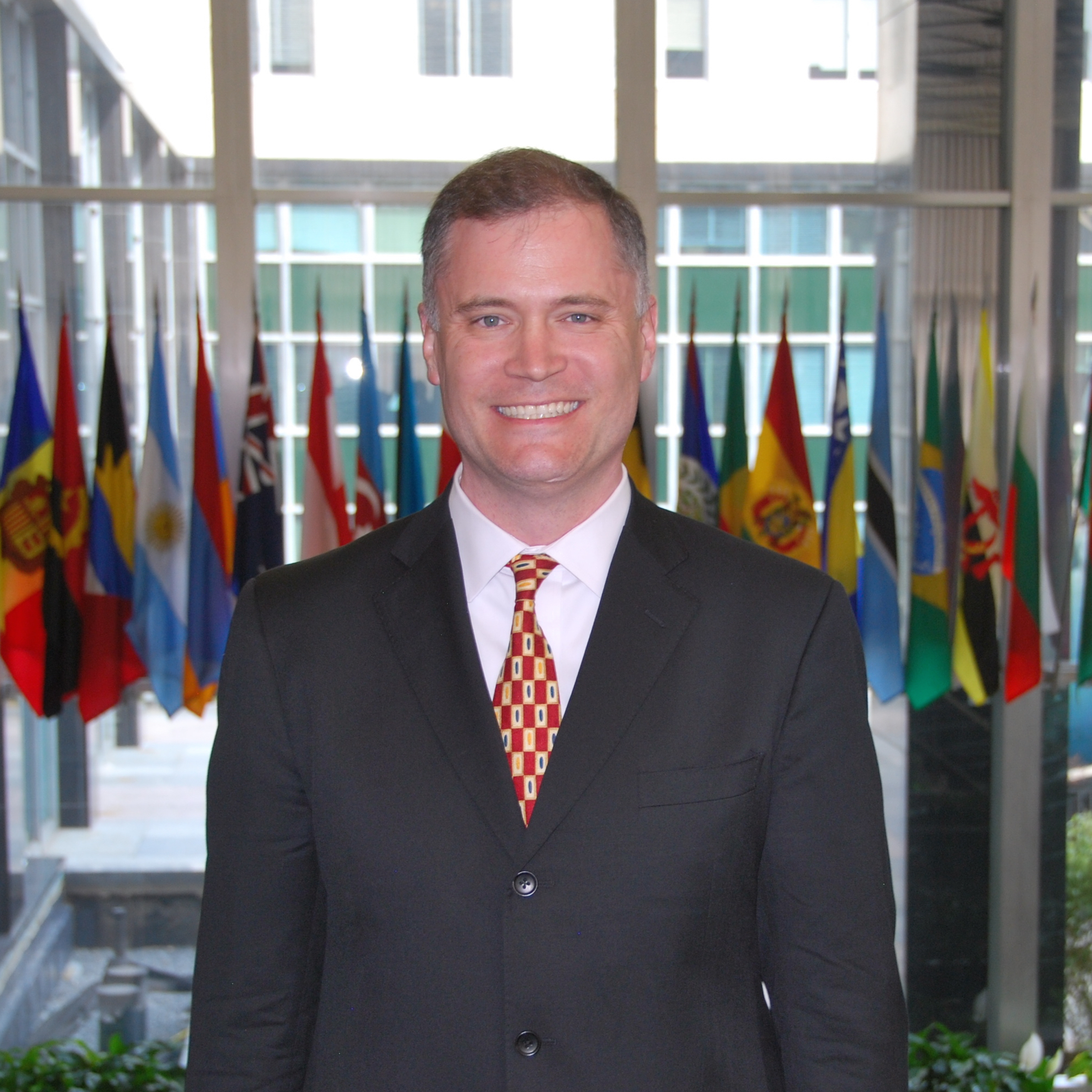
Daniel Oerther

== Coaches and athletic staff ==
Name	Notability	References
Jim Anderson	Head football coach (1992–1998), selected by the Philadelphia Eagles in the 1969 NFL/AFL draft	
Andy Ball	Head football coach (2022–present)	
Chester S. Barnard	Head swimming coach (1950) and assistant football coach (1950)	
Chuck Broyles	Football assistant coach (1973–1982), football defensive coordinator (1986–1987), and head baseball coach (1983); head football coach for the Pittsburg State Gorillas (1990–2009)	
Gale Bullman	Athletic director (1937–1967), head football coach (1937–1963), played in the NFL as an end for the Columbus Tigers (1925)	
Kirby Cannon	Head football coach (1999–2009)	
Frank Dennie	Athletic director (1909–1912, 1915–1928), head football coach (1909–1912, 1915–1917), associate professor of mathematics (1931–1951)	
Ben Douglas	Head basketball coach (1949–1950) and assistant football coach (1949), played in the NFL as a halfback for the Brooklyn Dodgers (1933)	
Harold Grant	Head football coach (1928–1936), head basketball coach (1932–1934)	
Dwight Hafeli	Head basketball coach (1942–1949), selected by the Chicago Cardinals in the 1937 NFL draft	
Harlan Hodges	Basketball and track coach (1946–1947)	
Thomas Kelley	Head football coach (1914) in which the team went 9–0 in the season without a single point being scored against the team, head football coach for the Alabama Crimson Tide (1915–1917)	
Stanley McCollum	Head football coach (1922–1927), head basketball coach (1921–1923)	
A. L. McRae	Head football coach (1893), professor of physics (1891–1894, 1899–1915), director of Missouri School of Mines and Metallurgy (1915–1920)	
Bud Saunders	Assistant football coach (1914) in which the team went 9–0 in the season without a single point being scored against the team, head football coach for the Clemson Tigers (1923–1926)	
R. R. Sermon	Head football coach (1918–1919), head basketball coach (1918–1920)	

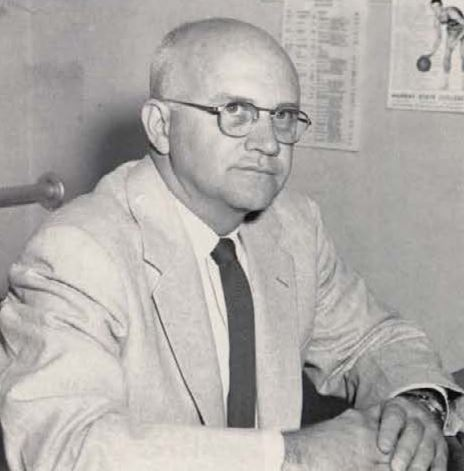
Harlan Hodges

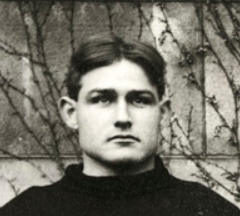
Thomas Kelley

== Chancellors and administrators ==
Name	Notability	References
John F. Carney	Chancellor of University of Missouri–Rolla/Missouri S&T (2005–2011), instrumental in renaming the University of Missouri–Rolla to Missouri University of Science and Technology	
Victoria Conkling-Whitney	Assistant in the preparatory department and recording secretary at Missouri School of Mines and Metallurgy (circa 1882), organized the Women's State Bar Association, the first organization of its kind in the West, and was the first woman attorney to practice before the St. Louis Court of Appeals	
Mohammad Dehghani	Chancellor of Missouri University of Science and Technology (2019–present)	
William Holding Echols	Director (1888–1889) and professor of mining engineering (circa 1883–1888) at Missouri School of Mines and Metallurgy	
Tomlinson Fort Jr.	Provost (1980–1982) and professor of chemistry and chemical engineering (1980–1982) at University of Missouri–Rolla, head of the chemical engineering departments at Carnegie Mellon University and Vanderbilt University	
Martin C. Jischke	Chancellor of University of Missouri–Rolla (1986–1991), president of Iowa State University (1991–2000), president of Purdue University (2000–2007)	
A. L. McRae	Director of Missouri School of Mines and Metallurgy (1915–1920), professor of physics (1891–1894, 1899–1915), head football coach (1893)	
Albert D. Nortoni	Member of the managing committee of Missouri School of Mines and Metallurgy (circa 1913–1918), nominated as the Progressive candidate for governor of Missouri in the 1912 election	
Mohammad Qayoumi	Vice chancellor for administrative services at University of Missouri–Rolla (1995–2000), 4th president of California State University, East Bay (2006–2011), 28th president of San Jose State University (2011–2015)	
Cheryl B. Schrader	Chancellor of Missouri S&T (2012–2017), president of Wright State University (2017–2019)	
Gary Thomas	Chancellor of University of Missouri–Rolla (2000–2005), provost and senior vice president of academic affairs at New Jersey Institute of Technology (1990–1998)	

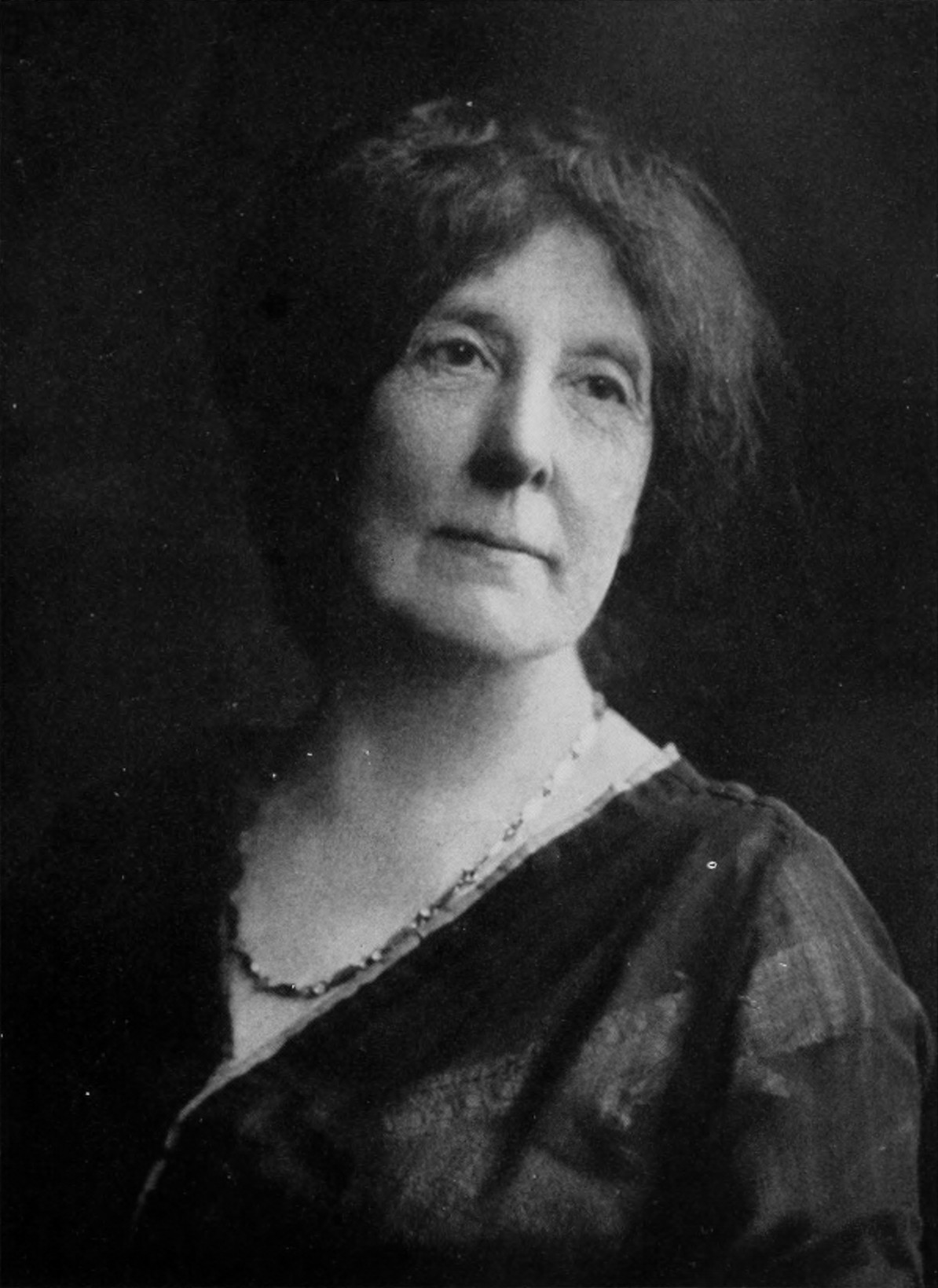
Victoria Conkling-Whitney

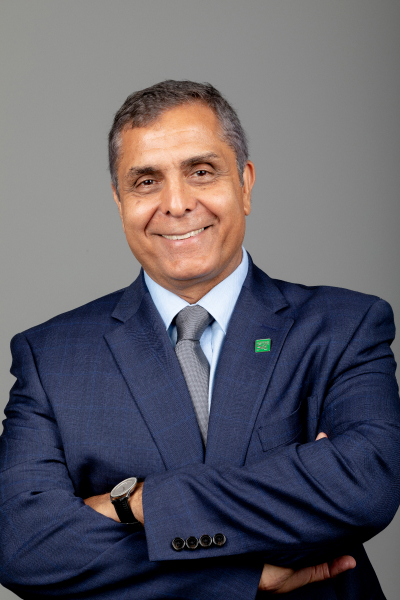
Dr. Mohammad "Mo" Dehghani

== See also ==
- List of Missouri University of Science and Technology alumni
