= Worsey =

Worsey is a surname. Notable people with the surname include:

- Louanne Worsey (born 2005), English footballer
- Paul Worsey, English mining engineer
