= California Museum of Photography =

Coordinates: 33.9816°N 117.3746°W

University of California, Riverside California Museum of Photography
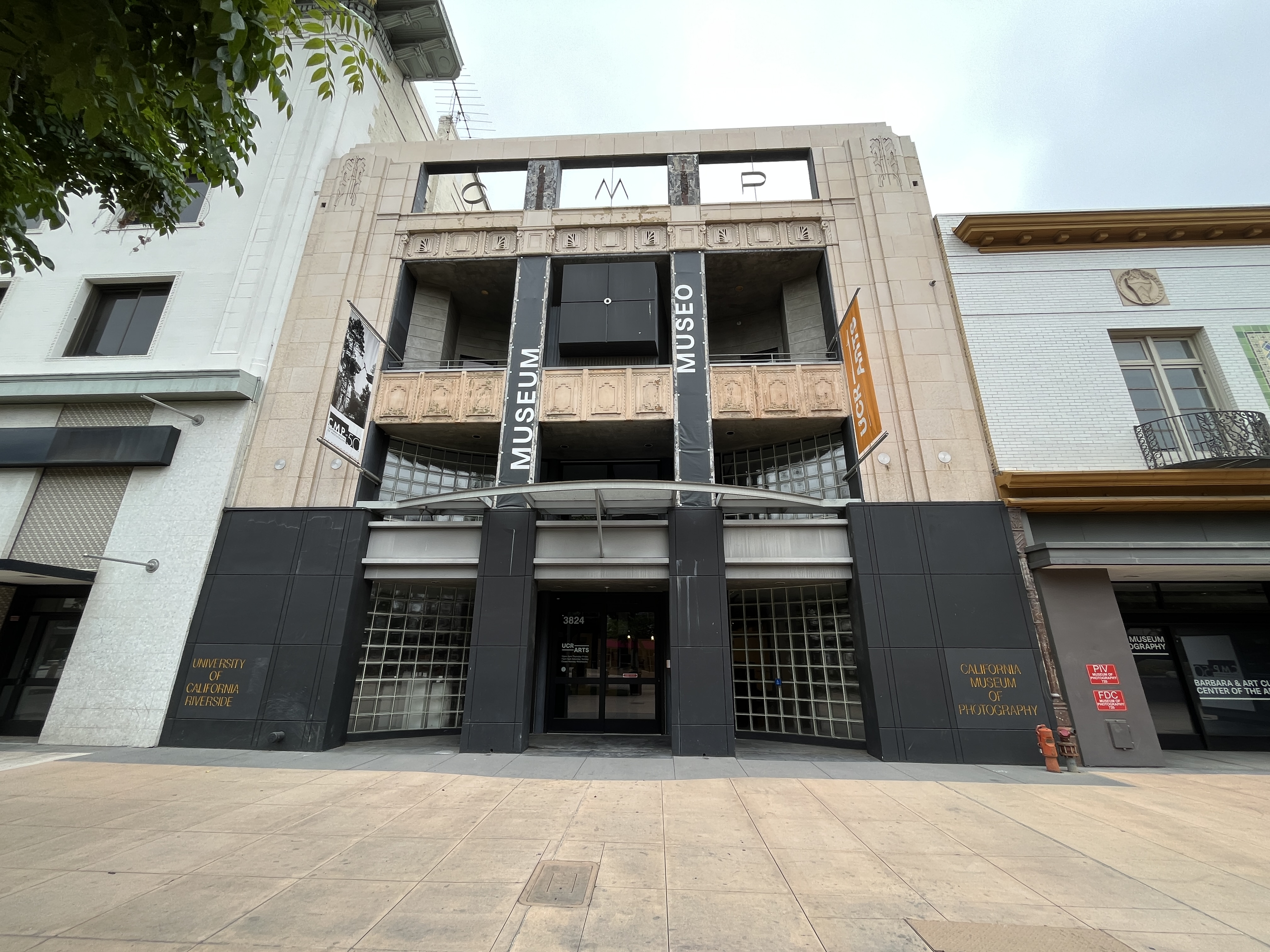
- Location: 3824 Main St, Riverside, CA 92501
- Owner: University of California, Riverside
- Operator: College of Humanities, Arts, and Social Sciences

Website
- ucrarts.ucr.edu

The California Museum of Photography is an off-campus institution and department within the College of Humanities, Arts, and Social Sciences at the University of California, Riverside, located in Riverside, California, United States.

The collections of the California Museum of Photography are the most extensive photographic holdings in the Western United States. The diverse collections of the California Museum of Photography encompass a wide range of photographic arts, history, and technology.

== Collections overview ==
The collections are categorized into four interconnected areas.

=== Bingham Technology Collection ===
The Bingham Technology Collection has expanded from its original donation of 2,000 vintage cameras by Dr. Robert Bingham in 1973 to a current count of 10,000 cameras, viewing devices, and photographic apparatus. In 1975, Popular Photography recognized UCR's Bingham Camera Collection as the second-largest collection, trailing only the George Eastman House Collection in Rochester, New York, and the Smithsonian Institution's collection.

The collection comprises four distinct subsets of camera technology: The Kibbey Zeiss-Ikon Collection, Curtis Polaroid Collection, Wodinsky Ihagee-Exakta Collection, and the Teague Kodak Brownie Collection. Notable artifacts within the collection include a Louis Daguerre camera, a Simon Wing multi-lens wet plate camera, a fully functional Caille Bros. Cail-O-Scope, and a Ponti megalethoscope. Being an actively utilized camera collection in the Western United States, this resource holds great value for photography scholars, museums, film and video producers, book and magazine publishers, regional schools, and photography clubs.

=== University Print Collection ===
The University Print Collection was established in 1979 through the acquisition of an exceptional collection of photographic master prints from Friends of Photography, made possible by several community patrons. Currently, the collection comprises over 20,000 images created by more than 1,000 photographers, including 7,000 negatives by Ansel Adams. Within the University Print Collection, one can find a significant number of vintage daguerreotypes, 1840s calotype negatives, ambrotypes from the Civil War era, commercial tintypes, as well as images spanning popular culture from the 1840s to the present.

A notable subset of the University Print Collection is the Keystone-Mast Collection, which encompasses over 250,000 original stereoscopic negatives and 100,000 paper prints. These original glass and film negatives serve as invaluable primary records documenting worldwide social, cultural, industrial, and agricultural history between 1860 and 1950. Since 2001, the California Museum of Photography website has featured visual online catalogs of the Keystone-Mast Collection, which were primarily funded through a Preservation and Access Grant from the National Endowment for the Humanities (NEH).

The MOAC project, aimed at creating catalogs accessible through the California Digital Library, receives additional support from the Institute for Museum and Library Services (IMLS). This funding helps facilitate the organization and accessibility of the collection's catalogs.

=== California Museum of Photography Study Center Library ===
The California Museum of Photography Study Center Library and Roy McJunkin Imaging Center are interconnected research spaces that house a collection of 10,000 photography monographs, manuscript materials, artist books, technical literature, exhibition catalogs, salon annuals, runs of photography periodicals, a copy stand, and a wide range of computer technology resources. These facilities serve as vital resources for international scholars, educational communities, and museum staff engaged in research activities.

=== Digital Virtual Collection ===
The Digital Virtual Collection is a comprehensive digital representation of the museum's collection. Since the museum first established an online presence in 1994, California Museum of Photography has added over 13,000 pages of content, which encompass more than 400 themed micro-sites and 9 major finding aids. Ongoing grants and initiatives have provided support for the museum to enhance its website and continue the digitization of artifacts found within its collections.
