= College of Humanities and Social Sciences =

College of Humanities and Social Sciences may refer to:

- Carnegie Mellon College of Humanities and Social Sciences
- College of Humanities and Social Sciences (University of Sydney)
- National Dong Hwa University College of Humanities and Social Sciences
- North Carolina State University College of Humanities and Social Sciences
- UCR College of Humanities, Arts, and Social Sciences
- Utah State University College of Humanities and Social Sciences
