= UC Davis College of Letters and Science =

Coordinates: 38°32′25″N 121°44′57″W

University of California, Davis College of Letters and Science
- Type: Public
- Established: 1951
- Parent institution: University of California, Davis
- Dean: Estella Atekwana
- Location: Davis, California, United States
- Website: lettersandscience.ucdavis.edu

The College of Letters and Science (L&S) is the largest college of the University of California, Davis.

In January 1922, to silence proposals from agricultural interests to sever the University Farm at Davis from the University of California, Berkeley, the Regents of the University of California authorized a two-year undergraduate program at Davis. This initial project soon evolved into a four-year undergraduate program leading to the degree of bachelor of science in agriculture, which was first awarded at Davis in 1926.

Several of the college's departments date back to the 1920s. They were originally developed as so-called "service divisions" of the College of Agriculture at Davis to provide courses in sciences and humanities to undergraduates at Davis.

In 1951, the College of Letters and Science at Davis was formed as a full-fledged college in its own right under founding dean Herbert A. Young. Several service divisions became the new college's first departments and over 50 faculty members of the College of Agriculture became the faculty of the new college. At its inception in fall 1951, L&S offered only five majors: botany, chemistry, zoology, English, and history. Only 76 students were declared L&S majors out of a total of 1,562 students enrolled at Davis. L&S grew very rapidly during the 1950s. By 1960, the number of L&S students had matched and then began to surpass the number of students enrolled in agriculture at Davis, and several departments had started to award graduate degrees.

Meanwhile, in 1959, Davis achieved full administrative independence from Berkeley as a general campus of the UC system.

The College of Letters and Science now has over 14,000 undergraduate students, 1,500 graduate students, 100,000 alumni, and 900 faculty, and offers more than 53 majors and 60 minors. The College of Letters and Science has over 55 departments and programs, 14 centers, labs, and museums, and received over 33 million dollars in research awards (2017–18).

== See also ==
- College of Letters and Science
