= Ernesto Galarza =

Mexican-American labor organizer, activist and professor

- Born: August 15, 1905; Jalcocotán, Nayarit, Mexico
- Died: June 22, 1984 (aged 78); San Jose, California, USA
- Education: Occidental College (BA); Stanford University (MA); Columbia University (PhD)
- Occupations: Labor organizer; activist; professor; poet; writer; storyteller
- Awards: Order of the Condor of the Andes

Ernesto Galarza (August 15, 1905 – June 22, 1984) was a Mexican-American labor organizer, activist, professor, poet, writer, storyteller, and a key figure in the history of immigrant farmworker organization in California. He had a dream of giving better living conditions to working-class Latinos.

== Early life ==
Born in Jalcocotán in the Mexican state of Nayarit, Galarza immigrated with his mother and two uncles to California. According to his autobiography, Barrio Boy, Galarza successfully navigated the U.S. public school system, received a scholarship to Occidental College in Los Angeles, and earned a master's degree in history at Stanford University in 1929.

== Career ==
Galarza worked with the American Union (now the Organization of American States) in Washington D.C. from 1936 through 1947 publishing analyses on educational, labor, and infrastructure issues in Latin America. In 1947, he completed his doctoral dissertation on the electricity industry in Mexico and earned a Ph.D. from Columbia University.

Galarza worked as a labor organizer and a leader of the emergence of the farm labor movement in California. Galarza began organizing farm workers in California in 1948 for the American Federation of Labor's short-lived National Farm Labor Union strike against the DiGiorgio Corporation in Arvin, California. The strike lasted 30 months, and entangled the company and the union in suits and counter-suits for the following 15 years. Between 1948 and 1959, Galarza and the union initiated twenty strikes and labor actions.

Although primarily an intellectual and scholar, Galarza initially played an activist's role in the AFL as the leader of several strikes. However, the temporary nature of the program meant that workers were constantly coming in and out of the country, making it difficult for organizers to establish long term connections and networks. The fundamentals of the program, in which workers were provided company owned housing, transportation, and other amenities also meant that Braceros were largely cut off from communication with the outside world, further limiting organizing capabilities.

Braceros were also governed by strict contracts, requiring them to stay with farmers for the duration of the season and forbidding them from organizing. These restrictions were compounded by the ever looming threat of deportation. These conditions promoted Galarza to abandon direct economic action for the written word in hopes of bringing about the end of the program. Consequently, Galarza began to focus his efforts on research and activism rather more than just unions and organizing, touring farms, interviewing workers, photographing conditions, and documenting labor abuses.

A prolific writer, Galarza's best-known work is Merchants of Labor (1964), an exposé of the abuses within the Bracero Program. The book was instrumental in the ending of the program. The end of the temporary worker program meant fears of deportation, strict contracts, and coming and goings of workers would no longer hider long term organizing. This in turn opened the door for Cesar Chavez to begin unionizing immigrant farmworkers in 1965.

In 1956 Galarza was awarded the Bolivian Order of the Condor of the Andes. The Ernesto Galarza Applied Research Center at the University of California Riverside and other California elementary and secondary schools bear his name. His many books include:

- Barrio Boy, 1971
- Merchants of Labor: The Mexican Bracero Story, 1964
- Spiders in the House and Workers in the Field, 1970

== Salinas Valley tragedy ==
In the wake of a bus crash in the Salinas Valley in September 1963 that claimed the lives of 32 braceros, Galarza was appointed to investigate the tragedy by Adam Clayton Powell Jr., chairman of the Committee on Education and Labor of the U.S. House of Representatives. His report, later published as a book named the Tragedy at Chualar (1977), was published by the committee in April 1964. The committee found that the accident was directly caused by negligence, exemplifying a practice in which flatbed trucks were illegally converted to buses and driven by poorly trained personnel. The indifference of safety officials, regulators and businesses supported Galarza's argument that the accident had been imminent. Published during a period of mounting pressure from previous findings, the report was largely credited in prompting Congress to end the Bracero Program in 1964.
