= Anthony Joseph Penico =

American mathematician and engineer

Anthony "Tony" Joseph Penico (June 11, 1923, Philadelphia – November 19, 2011, Missouri) was an American mathematician and engineer. He is known for the Penico theorem, Penico solvability, and Penico series.

After graduating from South Philadelphia High School, Penico was awarded scholarships to the University of Pennsylvania. There he graduated in 1946 with a bachelor's degree in physics and in 1950 with a Ph.D. in mathematics. His dissertation, written under the supervision of Richard D. Schafer, is entitled The Wedderburn Principal Theorem for Jordan Algebras. The theorem, which generalizes a theorem of A. A. Albert, was published in the Transactions of the American Mathematical Society in 1951. At the 1950 meeting of the International Congress of Mathematicians he was an approved (but not an invited) speaker. In October 1969 he contributed a paper Functional-analysis identities for biadditive mappings on modules with non-associative scalars to the 668th meeting of the American Mathematical Society.

After receiving his Ph.D., Penico moved with his wife to the Boston area, where he taught mathematics at Tufts College. In the mid-1950s the family moved to Northern California, where he worked as a Senior Engineering Specialist at the GTE's Research Laboratories. In the early 1960s, he became a Senior Research Mathematician at the Stanford Research Institute and also taught part-time at the University of California, Berkeley and at Stanford University. In 1966 Penico became a Professor of Mathematics at the University of Missouri–Rolla (which in 2008 was renamed the Missouri University of Science and Technology). He retired as professor emeritus in 1986.

In 1948 he married Eva Yaremko (1925–2017). They had two sons, David Anthony Penico (1952–2008) and Stephen John Penico (1956-2025). Anthony J. Penico died in 2011.

== Selected publications ==
- Fundingsland, O. T.; Faire, A. C.; Penico, A. J. (1954). "Laboratory studies of slow electron colliisions in gases by microwave methods". Rocket Exploration of the Upper Atmosphere, Special Supplement to the Journal of Atmospheric and Terrestrial Physics. New York: Interscience Publishers. p. 339. Bibcode:1954reua.conf..339F.
- Penico, A. J. (1961). Mathematical Methods in the Study of Wave Propagation in Inhomogeneous Media. Microwave Physics Lab, Mountain View, Ca., report AD0274125 to Defense Defense Information Center. Archived from the original on September 19, 2020.
- Penico, A.J. (1961). "Propagation of electromagnetic waves in a plasma with an inhomogeneous electron density". Planetary and Space Science. 6: 222. doi:10.1016/0032-0633(61)90026-5.
- Penico, A. J.; Stanojević, Č. V. (1980). "An integral analogue to parallelogram law". Proceedings of the American Mathematical Society. 79 (3): 427. doi:10.1090/S0002-9939-1980-0567985-1.
