= Stanley McCollum =

American football player and coach (1897–1973)

Biographical details
- Born: May 27, 1897; Adrian, Pennsylvania, U.S.
- Died: June 23, 1973 (aged 76); Orlando, Florida, U.S.

Playing career
- 1919–1921: Penn State
- Position: End

Coaching career (HC unless noted)
- 1922–1927: Missouri Mines

Head coaching record
- Overall: 20–26–3

Stanley Coleman "Mac" McCollum (May 27, 1897 – June 23, 1973) was an American football player and coach. From 1922 to 1927, he was the head coach at the Missouri School of Mines and Metallurgy—now known as the Missouri University of Science and Technology—in Rolla, Missouri.

He played college football for Penn State. At the end of the 1921 season, he was selected by The New York Times and Princeton coach Bill Roper as one of two ends on their respective All-East football team. He was also selected by writer Lawrence Perry as a second-team end on Perry's 1921 College Football All-America Team. On December 3, 1921, he made 10 of Penn State's 11 pass receptions in a victory against Washington.

McCollum was born on May 27, 1897, in Adrian, Pennsylvania and raised in Kittanning, Pennsylvania. He moved to Mount Dora, Florida in 1967. McCollum died on June 23, 1973, at Florida Sanitarium in Orlando, Florida.

== Head coaching record ==
Year	Team	Overall	Conference	Standing	Bowl/playoffs
Missouri Mines Miners (Missouri Intercollegiate Athletic Association) (1922–1923)
1922	Missouri Mines	1–6–1	1–2	10th	
1923	Missouri Mines	4–4	1–0	4th	
Missouri Mines Miners (Missouri College Athletic Union) (1924–1927)
1924	Missouri Mines	3–6	1–1	4th	
1925	Missouri Mines	5–2–1	1–0	2nd	
1926	Missouri Mines	5–3	1–0	2nd	
1927	Missouri Mines	2–5–1	1–2	T–6th	
Missouri Mines:		20–26–3	6–5		
Total:		20–26–3			
