= Ernst Kussul =

Lithuanian researcher

Ernst Kussul (29 May 1938 - 3 March 2023) was a Lithuanian researcher in artificial neural network, particularly for problems of handwriting recognition, mechatronics and the manufacture of microelectromechanical systems. He also published research papers on renewable energy, including for concentrated solar power. At the end of his life, he worked at the National Autonomous University of Mexico (UNAM), in the Microtechnology and Neural Networks group of the Department of Micro and Nanotechnologies of the Institute for Applied Sciences and Technology (ICAT).

== Education ==
Ernst Kussul received the Ph.D., degree in 1967 and the D.Sc., degree in 1982, both in neural networks from the Institute of Cybernetics of the Ukrainian Academy of Sciences, Kyiv, Ukraine.

== Career ==
He worked as researcher for the Ukrainian Academy of Sciences Institute of Cybernetics around 1980's.

In the last stage of his career, Dr. Kussul worked in UNAM, Mexico from 1998 until he died (2023).

He was "C level researcher" according to UNAM researchers category, PRIDE level "D" and member of the Mexican National Research System (SNI) level II. He coordinated the research group called "Microtechnology and Neural Networks" until 2007, he was head of the "Laboratory of Micromechanics and Mecatronics" at the same institute.

The Dr. Kussul authored 16 patents in Mexico, ex Soviet Union, Russia, Ukraine and USA. In Mexico, he registered 6 patents (four with UNAM and three together with the CINVESTAV), has 1 patent in USA and two patents in Spain, and 5 copyrights.

He authored more than 300 publications, including 105 international journal articles, 6 articles in Mexican journals, 19 chapters of books, six books (two with editorial Springer), 90 international congresses and participated in 59 Mexican congresses.

Dr. Kussul participated as responsible in 19 Mexican and international projects, accumulated 19 technical reports in the UNAM, 2 reports with ICYTDF, 2 reports with SUEMA. Dr. Kussul was also CONACYT projects evaluator.

Dr. Kussul was Member of IEEE from 2003 and Senior Member from February 2019. Dr. Kussul was a member of the Mexican Academy of Sciences from 2008. The Dr. Kussul was Member of Mexican Academy of Technology from 2000. In 2016 he was awarded the Prize of UNAM in area of Technological Innovation and Industrial Design.

== Death ==
Ernst Kussul died on the morning of Friday March 3rd, 2023 at his home in Mexico City when he was 84 years 9 months old.

== Recognition ==
Dr. E. Kussul was a member of the Mexican Academy of Sciences.

== Books ==
With Tetyana Baydyk and Donald Wunsch, Kussul is coauthor of the books Neural Networks and Micromechanics (Springer, 2009) and Intelligent Automation in Renewable Energy (Springer, 2019).
