= Tetyana Baydyk =

Ukrainian researcher

Tetyana Nikolaevna Baydyk (born 1954, Ukrainian: Байдик Тетяна Миколаївна, also published as Tatiana Baidyk) is a Ukrainian researcher in artificial neural network based image recognition, particularly for problems of handwriting recognition and the manufacture of microelectromechanical systems. She is also interested in the application of micromechanics in renewable energy, including for concentrated solar power. She works at the National Autonomous University of Mexico (UNAM), in the Microtechnology and Neural Networks group of the Department of Micro and Nanotechnologies of the Institute for Applied Sciences and Technology (ICAT).

== Education and career ==
Baydyk was born in 1954. After earning a master's degree in electrical engineering in 1977 at the Kyiv Polytechnic Institute, she earned a Ph.D. and D.Sc. through the Ukrainian Academy of Sciences Institute of Cybernetics in 1983 and 1994, respectively.

She worked as a junior researcher and then researcher at the Institute of Cybernetics, beginning in 1980. From 1995 to 1999 she coordinated the science and education program in Ukraine for the International Renaissance Foundation. She became a researcher at UNAM in 2001.

== Recognition ==
Baydyk is a member of the Mexican Academy of Sciences.

== Books ==
With Ernst Kussul and Donald Wunsch, Baydyk is coauthor of the books Neural Networks and Micromechanics (Springer, 2009) and Intelligent Automation in Renewable Energy (Springer, 2019).
