= College of Letters and Science =

College of Letters and Science is an alternate name for College of Arts and Sciences at various universities. Institutions known as a College of Letters and Science include the following:

- Arizona State University School of Letters and Sciences
- UC Berkeley College of Letters and Science
- UC Davis College of Letters and Science
- UCLA College of Letters and Science
- UC Riverside College of Letters and Science (since renamed)
- UCSB College of Letters and Science
- University of Wisconsin–Madison College of Letters and Science
- University of Wisconsin–Milwaukee College of Letters and Science

== See also ==
- College of Arts and Sciences
- Letters and Science
- Liberal arts college
- Man of letters
