= Daniel Zelinsky (mathematician) =

American mathematician (1922–2015)

- Born: 22 November 1922; Chicago
- Died: 16 September 2015 (aged 92)
- Awards: Guggenheim Fellowship

Academic background
- Education: University of Chicago
- Doctoral advisor: A. A. Albert

Academic work
- Discipline: Mathematics, algebra
- Institutions: Columbia University; Institute for Advanced Study; Northwestern University
- Notable students: Andy Magid

Daniel Zelinsky (22 November 1922 – 16 September 2015) was an American mathematician, specializing in algebra.

== Early life and education ==
Zelinsky studied at the University of Chicago with bachelor's degree in 1941. He received his PhD under A. A. Albert in 1943, with thesis Integral sets of quasiquaternion algebras.

== Career ==
From 1941 to 1943 he was a research mathematician in Columbia University's applied mathematics group, in which he was the youngest member. He was an instructor at the University of Chicago from 1943 to 1944.

Zelinsky worked from 1944 to 1946 for the applied mathematics group of Columbia University and from 1946 to 1947 as an instructor at the University of Chicago. From 1947 to 1949 he was at the Institute for Advanced Study as a National Research Council Fellow. At Northwestern University he became in 1949 an assistant professor, in the 1950s an associate professor, and in 1960 a full professor, retiring as professor emeritus in 1993. From 1975 to 1978 he was the chair of Northwestern University's mathematics department.

He was a Guggenheim Fellow for the academic year 1955–1956, which he spent at the Institute for Advanced Study. He was a visiting academic in 1960 at the University of California, Berkeley, in 1963 at Florida State University, in 1970–1971 at the Hebrew University of Jerusalem, and in 1979 at the Tata Institute. He was a co-editor of the collected works of A. A. Albert.

Zelinsky was elected a Fellow of the American Association for the Advancement of Science in 1983 and was the chair or co-chair of the Association's Section A from 1984 to 1987.

== Personal life ==
Zelinsky married Zelda Oser Zelinsky in September 1945. Upon his death he was survived by his widow, a daughter, two sons, and four grandchildren. He is the father of children's writer Paul O. Zelinsky, a cousin of American geographer Wilbur Zelinsky, and uncle of American luthier Dean Zelinsky.

== Selected publications ==
- A first course in linear algebra. Academic Press. 1968. Zelinsky, Daniel (2014). pbk reprint. Academic Press. ISBN 9781483265001.
- as editor: Brauer groups : proceedings of the Conference held at Evanston, October 11–15, 1975. Lecture Notes in Mathematics, 549. Springer. 1976.
