= Alice T. Schafer =

American mathematician

- Born: Alice Elizabeth Turner; June 18, 1915; Richmond, Virginia
- Died: September 27, 2009 (aged 94); Lexington, Massachusetts
- Education: University of Richmond, B.A.; University of Chicago, Ph.D.
- Spouse: Richard D. Schafer (m. 1942–2009)
- Children: 2

Alice Turner Schafer (June 18, 1915 – September 27, 2009) was an American mathematician. She was one of the founding members of the Association for Women in Mathematics in 1971.

== Early life ==
Alice Elizabeth Turner was born on June 18, 1915, in Richmond, Virginia. She received a full scholarship to study at the University of Richmond. She was the only female mathematics major. At the time, women were not allowed in the campus library. She was a brilliant student and won the department's James D. Crump Prize in mathematics in her junior year. She completed her B.A. degree in mathematics in 1936.

For three years Alice was a secondary school teacher, accruing savings to pay for graduate school.

At University of Chicago, Alice was a student of Ernest Preston Lane, author of Metric Differential Geometry of Curves and Surfaces (1940) and A Treatise on Projective Differential Geometry (1942). Alice studied differential geometry of curves and implications of the singular point of a curve. When a curve has null binormal, it is planar at that point. Duke Mathematical Journal published her work in 1944. Alice continued her investigations into curves near an undulation point, publishing in American Journal of Mathematics in 1948.

When she was completing her studies at Chicago, she met Richard Schafer, who was also completing his Ph.D. in mathematics at Chicago. In 1942 Turner married Richard Schafer, after both had completed their doctorates. They had two sons.

== Academic career ==
After completing her Ph.D., Alice Schafer taught at Connecticut College, Swarthmore College, the University of Michigan and several other institutions. In 1962 she joined the faculty of Wellesley College as a full professor. Her husband Richard was working at the Massachusetts Institute of Technology, researching non-associative algebras. In 1966 he published a book on them which he dedicated "To Alice".

As a teacher, Alice especially reached out to students who had difficulties with or were afraid of mathematics, by designing special classes for them. She took a special interest in helping high-school students, women in particular, achieve in mathematics.

In 1971, Schafer was one of the founding members of the Association for Women in Mathematics. She was elected as the second President of the Association, and "Under the leadership of its second president Alice T. Schafer, [AWM] was legally incorporated in 1973 and received tax-exempt status in 1974."

Schafer was named Helen Day Gould Professor of Mathematics at Wellesley in 1980. She retired from Wellesley in 1980. However, she remained there for two more years during which she was chairman of Wellesley's Affirmative Action Program. After retiring from Wellesley, she taught at Simmons College and was also involved in the management program in the Radcliffe College Seminars. Her husband retired from MIT in 1988 and the couple moved to Arlington, Virginia. However, she still wanted to teach. She became professor of mathematics at Marymount University until a second retirement in 1996.

== Awards and honors ==
Schafer received many awards and honors for her service to mathematics. She received an honorary degree from the University of Richmond in 1964. She was elected a fellow of the American Association for the Advancement of Science in 1985.

In 1990 the Association for Women in Mathematics established the Alice T. Schafer Prize to honor her for her dedicated service towards increasing the participation of women in mathematics.

In January 1998, she received the Yueh-Gin Gung and Dr Charles Y Hu Award for Distinguished Service to Mathematics, awarded by the Mathematical Association of America.
