= Richard D. Schafer =

American mathematician

Richard Schafer
- Born: Richard Donald Schafer; February 25, 1918; Buffalo, New York, New York
- Died: December 28, 2014 (aged 96); Lexington, Massachusetts
- Spouse: Alice Turner Schafer (m. 1942; died 2009)
- Children: 2

Academic background
- Education: University of Buffalo; University of Chicago
- Thesis: Alternative Algebras over an Arbitrary Field (1942)
- Doctoral advisor: Abraham Adrian Albert

Academic work
- Discipline: Mathematics
- Sub-discipline: Algebra
- Institutions: University of Michigan; Institute for Advanced Study; University of Pennsylvania; University of Connecticut; Massachusetts Institute of Technology
- Doctoral students: Anthony J. Penico
- Notable works: An Introduction to Nonassociative Algebras (1966)

Richard Donald Schafer (February 25, 1918 – December 28, 2014) was an American mathematician.

== Education ==
Richard Schafer studied at the University at Buffalo, where he received his bachelor's degree in 1938 and his master's degree in 1940. He received in 1942 from the University of Chicago his PhD under Abraham Adrian Albert with dissertation Alternative Algebras over an Arbitrary Field.

== Career ==
After service in the U.S. Naval Reserve from 1942 to 1945, he was an instructor at the University of Michigan for the academic year 1945–1946. From 1946 to 1948 he was at the Institute for Advanced Study. From 1948 to 1953 he was a professor at the University of Pennsylvania. From 1953 to 1958 he was at University of Connecticut as professor and head of the mathematics department. He spent the academic year 1958–1959 at the Institute for Advanced Study. From 1959 until his retirement in 1988, he was a professor at the Massachusetts Institute of Technology. In 2012 he was elected a Fellow of the American Mathematical Society.

In 1954 he studied algebras based on the Cayley–Dickson construction.

Schafer did research on algebra, specifically on Jordan algebras and Lie algebras. He is best known for his textbook An Introduction to Nonassociative Algebras, first published in 1966, which has been freely available since 2008 from Project Gutenberg. He and Kevin McCrimmon investigated non-commutative Jordan algebras.

Richard Schafer was married to the mathematician Alice Turner Schafer (1915–2009) from 1942 until her death. Upon his death he was survived by two sons, three grandchildren, and two great-grandchildren.
