= Diane J. Cook =

American computer scientist

- Born: November 20, 1963 (age 62)
- Occupations: Computer scientist, educator
- Employer: Washington State University

Diane Joyce Cook (born November 20, 1963) is an American computer scientist whose research interests include artificial intelligence, data mining, machine learning, home automation, and smart environments. She is Regents Professor and Huie-Rogers Chair Professor of Electrical Engineering and Computer Science at Washington State University.

Her research has included methods for testing the intelligence of artificially intelligent systems, using sensors in home automation to detect mental issues in older residents, developing robotic home care assistants, adapting to the habits of smart home owners, and more generally application of ubiquitous computing and ambient intelligence in home automation.

== Education and career ==
Cook studied mathematics and computer science at Wheaton College (Illinois), graduating in 1985. She went to the University of Illinois Urbana-Champaign for graduate study, earning a master's degree in 1987 on the automation of music notation under the joint supervision of computer scientist William Kubiz and experimental musician Sever Tipei, and completing a Ph.D. in 1990 on topics related to planning in artificial intelligence, supervised by Robert Stepp.

She became an assistant professor at the University of South Florida and a faculty fellow at the NASA Ames Research Center, but quickly moved to the University of Texas at Arlington, becoming professor there in 2001 and University Distinguished Scholar Professor in 2004. In 2006, she moved to Washington State University as Regents Professor and Huie-Rogers Chair.

== Books ==
Cook is the coauthor of:

- Smart Environments: Technology, Protocols, and Applications (with Sajal K. Das, Wiley, 2005)
- Activity Learning: Discovering, Recognizing, and Predicting Human Behavior from Sensor Data (with Narayanan C. Krishnan, Wiley, 2015)

With Lawrence B. Holder, she is the co-editor of Mining Graph Data (Wiley, 2007).

== Recognition ==
Cook was named a Fellow of the IEEE in 2008, "for contributions to machine learning algorithm design and application". In 2016 she was named a Fellow of the National Academy of Inventors. She was named as an ACM Fellow, in the 2024 class of fellows, "for contributions to machine learning and digital health".
