= Andy Magid =

American mathematician

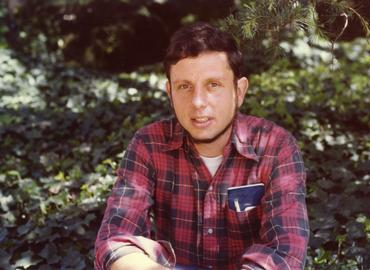
Andy Magid 1980

Andy Roy Magid (born 4 May 1944 in Saint Paul, Minnesota) is an American mathematician.

Magid received in 1966 from the University of California, Berkeley his bachelor's degree and in 1969 from Northwestern University his PhD under the direction of Daniel Zelinsky with thesis Separable Subalgebras of Commutative Algebras and Other Applications of the Boolean Spectrum. From 1969 to 1972 Magid was a Ritt Assistant Professor at Columbia University. At the University of Oklahoma he was from 1972 to 1974 an assistant professor, from 1974 to 1977 an associate professor, and from 1977 to 2012 a full professor, retiring as professor emeritus in 2012. From 1989 to 1994 he was the chair of the University of Oklahoma's Department of Mathematics. In 1989 he was named George Lynn Cross Research Professor.

In 1975–1976 Magid was a visiting associate professor at the University of Illinois. He has also been a visiting professor at the University of Virginia, the Hebrew University in Jerusalem, the Technion (as Lady Davis Fellow), Bar Ilan University and the University of California, Berkeley.

His research is concerned with commutative algebra, Galois theory of rings, algebraic geometry, algebraic groups, representations of groups and differential Galois theory. He has also published on mathematics education. He is the author or coauthor of over 85 research papers and 5 books.

In 2012 Magid was elected a Fellow of the American Mathematical Society.

== Selected publications ==
- 1974: The separable Galois theory of commutative rings, Marcel Dekker, 2014: 2nd edition, CRC Press
- 1982: Module categories of analytic groups, Cambridge Tracts in Mathematics, Cambridge University Press
- 1985: (with Alexander Lubotzky) Varieties of representations of finitely generated groups, Memoirs of the American Mathematical Society
- 1985: Applied matrix models: a second course in linear algebra with computer applications, John Wiley & Sons
- 1994: Lectures on Differential Galois Theory, American Mathematical Society, 2nd ed. 1997
- 1999: Differential Galois Theory, Notices of the American Mathematical Society 46(9): 1041–1049
- 2000: (with C. McKnight, T. Murphy, and M. McKnight) Mathematics education research. A guide to the research mathematician, American Mathematical Society
