= UC Berkeley College of Letters and Science =

University college

University of California, Berkeley College of Letters and Science
- Type: Public
- Established: 1915
- Affiliations: University of California, Berkeley
- Dean: Jennifer Johnson-Hanks, Executive Dean
- Faculty: ~750
- Undergraduates: ~23,601
- Postgraduates: 2,417
- Location: Berkeley, California, United States
- Website: ls.berkeley.edu

The College of Letters and Science (L&S) is the largest of the 15 colleges at the University of California, Berkeley and encompasses the liberal arts. The college was established in its present state in 1915 with the merger of the College of Letters, the College of Social Science, and the College of Natural Science. As of the 2022-23 academic year, there were about 23,601 undergraduates and 2,417 graduate students enrolled in the college. The College of Letters and Science awards only Bachelor of Arts degrees at the undergraduate level, in contrast to the other schools and colleges of UC Berkeley which award only Bachelor of Science degrees at the undergraduate level.

== Faculty and students ==
The College of Letters and Science consists of five divisions: the Arts and Humanities Division, the Biological Sciences Division, the Mathematical and Physical Sciences Division, the Social Sciences Division, and the Undergraduate Division.

Of the graduate divisions, social sciences is the most popular, followed by mathematical and physical sciences, arts and humanities, and biological science. The undergraduate division serves the 23,000 undergraduate students in L&S. Each division has its own administration, including a dean, associate dean, and assistant deans. Jennifer Johnson-Hanks serves as the college's executive dean. L&S has about 750 faculty members, including 13 Nobel laureates, 3 Pulitzer Prize winners, and 12 MacArthur Fellows.

The majority of undergraduates at the university are enrolled in the College of Letters and Science. Although freshman applicants indicate an area of interest on their applications, all freshmen in L&S enter as undeclared majors. This contrasts with other undergraduate colleges at UC Berkeley, such as the College of Engineering, where applicants indicate their major on the application and enter as declared majors. L&S undergraduates must declare a major before they begin their junior year. "Capped majors" (e.g. Economics, Public Health, Psychology) are impacted and have more stringent declaration policies. All undergraduates in L&S must complete classes in reading & composition, quantitative reasoning, foreign language, and a seven-course breadth requirement.

L&S offers a wide variety of graduate programs, including master's and doctorate programs. Many of these programs are ranked within the top five in their field by U.S. News & World Report. Two programs, Jewish Studies and Near Eastern Religions, are joint programs with the Graduate Theological Union in Berkeley. One program, Medical Anthropology, is a joint program with the University of California, San Francisco. The L&S graduate division serves 87 master's/first professional students and 2,676 doctoral students as of Fall 2013.

== Criticism ==
The main disadvantage of the size of L&S is an impersonal undergraduate experience, especially in large lower-division survey courses (before students declare specific majors, begin to work more closely with department advisers and faculty members in their chosen major, and switch to smaller upper-division courses). During the Berkeley student protests in the 1960s, one student reportedly wore a placard which mocked the preprinted warning on the punched cards used in that era to automate class registration and grading for many thousands of students: "I am a UC student. Please do not bend, fold, spindle or mutilate me". It is because of L&S's impersonal atmosphere that UC President Clark Kerr experimented with residential college systems at the newer UC campuses at San Diego and Santa Cruz.

== See also ==
- College of Letters and Science
