= Donald Wunsch =

American computer engineer

Donald C. Wunsch II is Mary K. Finley Distinguished Professor of computer engineering at the Missouri University of Science and Technology, and a Fellow of the Institute of Electrical and Electronics Engineers He is known for his work on " hardware implementations, reinforcement and unsupervised learning".

== Education ==
Wunsch obtained a B.S. in Applied mathematics from the University of New Mexico in 1984, a M.S. in Applied mathematics from the University of Washington in 1987, and a Ph.D. in electrical engineering, also from the University of Washington in 1991 with a thesis "An optoelectronic learning machine". Later, in 2006, he obtained an Executive MBA from the Olin Business School at Washington University in St. Louis.

== Career ==
From 1984 to 1993 he worked for Boeing, rising to the level of senior principal scientist. In 1993 he joined Texas Tech University, as assistant professor with a joint appointment to the Department of Electrical and Computer Engineering, and Computer Science. In 1998, he was promoted to associate professor.

In 1999, he left Texas for the Missouri University of Science and Technology, becoming Mary K. Finley Distinguished Professor in the Department of Electrical and Computer Engineering, with courtesy appointments in the departments of System Engineering, Computer Science, and Business Administration.

== Publications ==
He is author or coauthor of:

- Lei Meng, Ah-Hwee Tan, and Donald C. Wunsch II, Adaptive Resonance Theory in Social Media Data Clustering, Springer-Verlag, 2019. ISBN 9783030029852
- Baydyk, T., Kussul, E., & Wunsch, D. C. (2019). Intelligent automation in renewable energy. Springer, 2019 ISBN 9783030022365
- Khalid Al-Jabery, Gayla Olbricht, Tayo Obafemi-Ajayi and Donald C. Wunsch II, Computational Learning Approaches to Data Analytics in Biomedical Applications, Elsevier, 2019. ISBN 9780128144831
- J. Sieffertt and D.C. Wunsch, Unified Computational Intelligence for Complex Systems: Studies in Neural, Economic and Social Dynamics. Springer-Verlag, 2010. ISBN 9783642031809
- E. Kussul, T. Baidyk, and D.C. Wunsch II, Neural Networks in Micromechanics, Springer-Verlag, 2010.
- R. Xu and D.C. Wunsch II, Clustering. IEEE Press / Wiley, 2009. ISBN 9780470382783
- Gorban, Alexander N., Balázs Kégl, Donald C. Wunsch, and Andrei Y. Zinovyev. 2008. Principal Manifolds for Data Visualization and Dimension Reduction. Springer 2008

The most highly cited of his papers, according to Google Scholar, are

- Prokhorov, D.V. and Wunsch, D.C., 1997. Adaptive critic designs. IEEE transactions on Neural Networks, 8(5), pp. 997–1007. (cited 1182 times)
- Saad, Emad W., Danil V. Prokhorov, and Donald C. Wunsch. "Comparative study of stock trend prediction using time delay, recurrent and probabilistic neural networks." IEEE Transactions on neural networks 9.6 (1998): 1456–1470. (cited 578times)
- Li, Shuhui, Donald C. Wunsch, Edgar A. O'Hair, and Michael G. Giesselmann. "Using neural networks to estimate wind turbine power generation." IEEE Transactions on energy conversion 16, no. 3 (2001): 276–282. (cited 392 times)
- Xu, Rui, and Donald C. Wunsch. "Clustering algorithms in biomedical research: a review." IEEE reviews in biomedical engineering 3 (2010): 120–154.(cited 230 times)

== Honors ==
In 2005 he was president of the International Neural Networks Society, and in 2015 was a recipient of that society's Gabor Award. .

He is a Fellow of the IEEE, an INNS Senior Fellow, and Charles Hedlund Distinguished Visiting professor at the American University in Cairo.
