= Yihong Qi =

- Scientific career
- Fields: Electrical Engineering, Computer Engineering
- Workplaces: Missouri University of Science and Technology

Yihong Qi is an engineer, professor, entrepreneur, and inventor. His work focuses on networking science and technology. Qi is currently an adjunct professor of Electrical and Computer Engineering at the Missouri University of Science and Technology. He is a Fellow of The Canadian Academy of Engineering and of the National Academy of Inventors. Qi's research has led to the founding of five independent companies.

== Education ==
Qi received his Master of Engineering (Space Electronics) at the Chinese Academy of Space Technology in 1985 and earned a Doctor of Philosophy degree (Microwave Engineering) at Xidian University in 1989.

== Career ==
Qi worked for Research In Motion Ltd. (now BlackBerry) from 1995 to 2010, where in his role as the Director of Advanced Electromagnetic Research he was in charge of system integrations, antenna development, and radio frequency (RF) and electromagnetic compatibility (EMC) measurement.

In 2006, Qi co-founded Sunway Communication, a design and manufacturing company that produces electronic components and modules including RF antennas and connectors for use in IoT, automotive, consumer electronics, and more. This company was listed on the Shenzhen Stock Exchange in 2010.

In 2011, Qi founded DBJ Technologies, a communications software and hardware company primarily known for the research and development of mobile communication platform software and hardware.

In 2012, he co-founded AccuGPS, a global software technology company known for its fleet management system.

In 2013, he founded ENICE, a wireless telecommunications technology enterprise that supplies and integrates peripheral equipment in wireless communications.

In 2014, he co-founded General Test Systems, a wireless telecommunications company known to primarily provide Over-the-Air (OTA) testing of mobile terminal antennas.

In 2017, Qi co-founded Mercku, a connectivity company, where they provide Wi-Fi solutions for businesses and subscribers.

In 2021, Qi co-founded Pontosense, an artificial intelligence company that uses mmWave sensors to measure biometrics wirelessly.

== Awards and honours ==
- 2014 - Distinguished Lecturer, IEEE EMC Society
- 2015 - Distinguished Lecturer, IEEE EMC Society
- 2017 - Technical Achievement Award, IEEE EMC Society
- 2018 - Fellow, Canadian Academy of Engineering
- 2019 - Fellow, National Academy of Inventors
