= Wei-Wen Yu =

Chinese-born American civil engineer (1923–2026)

- Born: July 10, 1923; Weifang, Shandong, China
- Died: June 2, 2026 (aged 102)
- Education: National Taiwan University; Oklahoma State University; Cornell University
- Occupation: Civil engineer
- Spouse: Yueh-hsin Wang (m. 1953; died 2025)

Wei-Wen Yu (July 10, 1923 – June 2, 2026) was a Chinese-born American civil engineer who was known for his work on cold-formed steel structures. He was the Curators' Distinguished Professor at the Missouri University of Science and Technology, and the founding director of the Center for Cold-Formed Steel Structures, and an author of the textbook Cold-Formed Steel Design.

== Early life and career ==
Yu was born in Weifang, Shandong, on July 10, 1923. He attended National Taiwan University, earning his bachelor's degree in civil engineering in 1950. He emigrated to the United States, and attended Oklahoma State University, earning his master's degree in 1955. He also attended Cornell University, earning his PhD degree in structural engineering in 1960. After earning his degrees, he worked as a researcher at the American Iron and Steel Institute from 1960 to 1967.

He specialized in cold-formed steel structures. He served as a professor in the department of civil engineering at the Missouri University of Science and Technology from 1968 until the 2000s. During his years as a professor, he published the textbook Cold-Formed Steel Design, five other books, and more than 100 articles and technical reports related to cold-formed steel. In 1982, he was named the Curators' Distinguished Professor. In 1990, he founded the Center for Cold-Formed Steel Structures at the university; the center was renamed the Wei-Wen Yu Center for Cold-Formed Steel Structures in 2000. He moved to Boston, Massachusetts, in 2015.

== Personal life and death ==
In 1953, Yu married Yueh-hsin Wang. Their marriage lasted until her death in 2025.

Yu turned 100 on July 10, 2023, and died on June 2, 2026, at the age of 102.
