= The Detonators (TV series) =

2009 reality series documentary

- Genre: Documentary; Reality
- Starring: Dr. Braden Lusk; Dr. Paul Worsey
- Country of origin: United States
- Original language: English
- No. of seasons: 1
- No. of episodes: 13

Production
- Executive producers: Rachel Bell; Charles Tremayne
- Producer: Wendy Greene
- Running time: 45-50 minutes

Original release
- Network: Discovery Channel
- Release: January 28 – July 28, 2009

The Detonators is a reality series documentary which aired on the Discovery Channel. The program featured the thought process and procedures in performing demolition through the use of explosives.

The show was hosted by two demolition experts: Dr. Braden Lusk, an assistant professor at the University of Kentucky College of Engineering, and Dr. Paul Worsey, professor and director of explosives engineering education at the Missouri University of Science and Technology. Lusk and Worsey gave the viewers a behind-the-scenes look at the science of destroying large structures without damaging the surrounding buildings and landscapes.

The Detonators consisted of a single season with 13 episodes airing between January and July 2009. No additional episodes have been produced since.

== Episode list ==
Ep#	Location	Original airdate
01	Liverpool	January 28, 2009
02	Glasgow	February 4, 2009
03	Bermuda	February 11, 2009
04	Coral Gables, Florida	February 18, 2009
05	Foxburg, Pennsylvania	February 25, 2009
06	Louisville, Kentucky	March 15, 2009
07	Bismarck, North Dakota	March 25, 2009
08	Fort William, Scotland	April 2, 2009
09	Weirton, West Virginia	April 2, 2009
10	Newcastle, England	April 9, 2009
11	Toronto, Ohio	July 6, 2009
12	Charlotte, North Carolina	July 7, 2009
13	Foxburg, Pennsylvania	July 28, 2009

== Broadcast Airings ==
Repeats of the series aired on the digital broadcast network Quest in mid-2020; however, the network says "No upcoming air dates currently scheduled for this program."
