= Ida A. Bengtson =

American bacteriologist

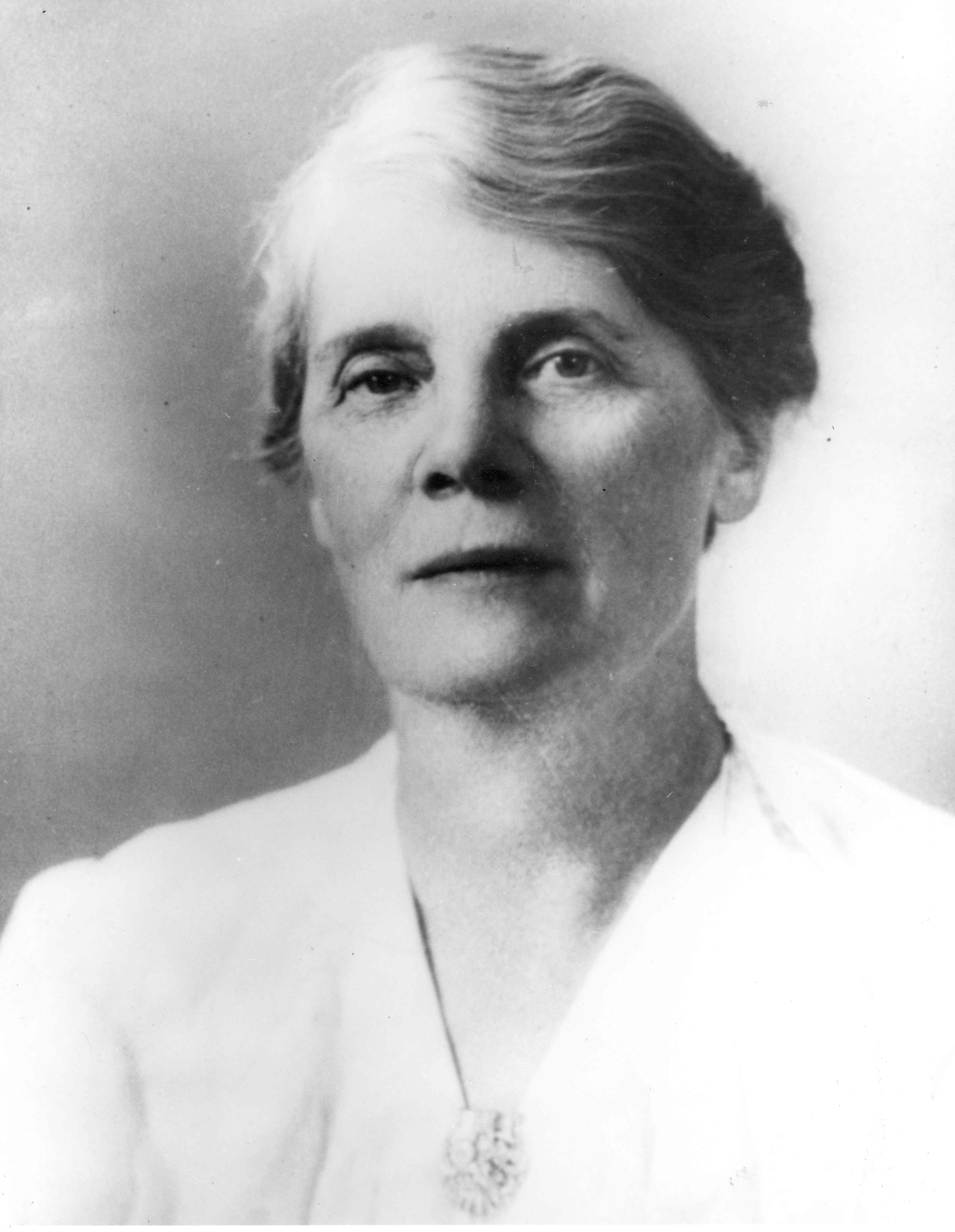
- Born: 1881; Nebraska
- Died: 1952 (aged 70–71)
- Education: University of Nebraska, University of Chicago
- Known for: Classification of Clostridium botulinum, standards for gas gangrene toxins and anti-toxins
- Scientific career
- Fields: bacteriology
- Workplaces: United States Public Health Service's Hygienic Laboratory

Ida Albertina Bengtson (1881–1952) was an American bacteriologist, known for her work with anaerobic organisms. She became the first woman hired to work in the United States Public Health Service's Hygienic Laboratory, at the National Institutes of Health.

== Life and education ==
Ida Bengtson was born in Harvard, Nebraska, on January 17, 1881. She attended the University of Nebraska graduating in 1903 with degrees in mathematics and languages.

== Early career ==
Following graduation, Bengtson began working at the U.S. Geological Survey Library. Finding the job to be of low interest to her she spoke to a close friend who encouraged her to go back to school. In 1911, she entered the University of Chicago to study bacteriology and biochemistry, and earned her master's degree in 1913 and her PhD in 1919, both from the University of Chicago. While studying, she also worked as a bacteriologist in the Chicago Department of Health in 1915. In 1916 she became the first woman hired to work in the United States Public Health Service's Hygienic Laboratory (later part of the National Institutes of Health). Ida paved the way for the hiring of additional female scientists in the NIH and worked alongside other influential women such as Alice Evans, who went on to serve as the first woman president of the Society of American Bacteriologists.

== Main impacts ==
Bengston was influential in the study of bacterial diseases like typhus, botulism and trachoma.

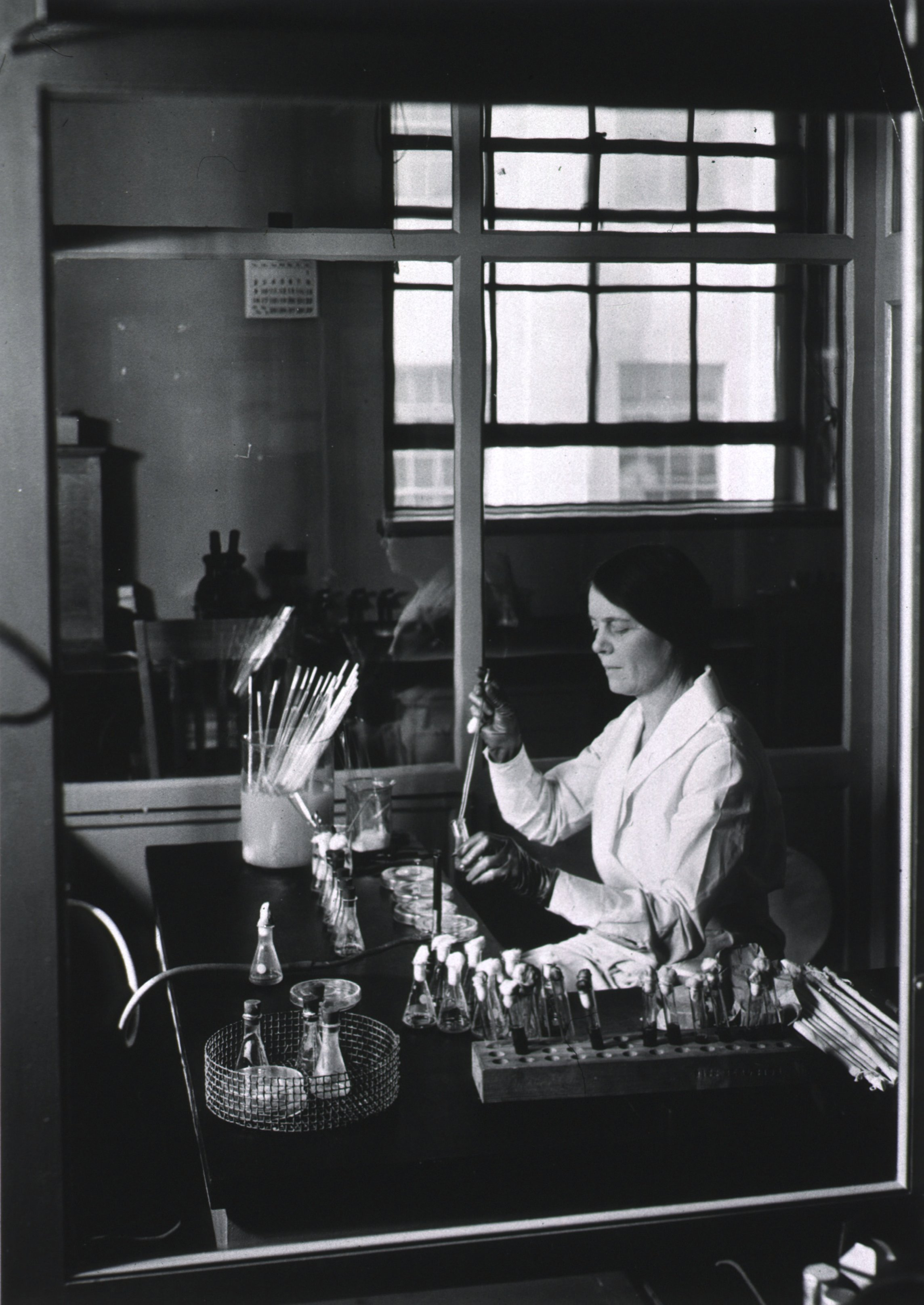
Ida Bengston

=== Typhus ===
Following her hiring at the NIH, Bengtson helped to discover that the 1917 tetanus outbreak running rampant across the US could be traced back to a batch of contaminated vaccine scarifiers. After this finding, Bengtson began further researching the infectious diseases presenting themselves in various communities across the United States. This research led to the production of a typhus vaccine, and a revolutionary test called the complement fixation test. This test has been applied to differentiate diseases like Rocky Mountain spotted fever and Q fever.

Typhus proved to be an exceedingly dangerous interest and she, like many other typhus researchers, eventually contracted the disease, although she recovered fully. Her chapter on the family “Rickettsiaceae” appeared in the sixth edition of the influential Bergey’s Manual of Determinative Bacteriology after her official retirement. She was awarded the Typhus Medal of the American Typhus Commission in 1947.

=== Clostridium botulinum ===
Bengtson's scientific achievement was also in the study of an organism called Clostridium botulinum, which causes a paralytic disease in chicken (limberneck). This organism was first recognized and isolated in 1895 by Emile van Ermengem from home-cured ham implicated in a botulism outbreak. The isolate was originally named Bacillus botulinus, after the Latin word for sausage, botulus. ("Sausage poisoning" was a common problem in 18th- and 19th-century Germany, and was most likely caused by botulism.) However, isolates from subsequent outbreaks were always found to be anaerobic spore formers, so Bengtson proposed that the organism be placed in the genus Clostridium as the genus Bacillus was restricted to aerobic spore-forming rods. Her work helped establish Clostridium botulinum type C as a cause of infantile paralysis.

=== Trachoma ===
Based on her work with the US Public Health Service (USPHS), and its Hygienic Laboratory, now the National Institutes of Health (NIH), she was moved to Rolla, Missouri, to begin to investigate endemic trachoma that was particularly widespread in the region of Alabama, Missouri, Tennessee, and Oklahoma. She arrived in Rolla in 1924 and took her place in the biology lab at the Missouri School of Mines (MSM, now Missouri S&T), in the basement of Parker Hall.

Bengtson ran the trachoma hospital in Rolla, one of only four in the country at the time. It was in a small, wood-framed house on Elm Street, but it soon was too small to serve all the people who needed treatment. After Bengtson left Rolla in 1931, a new trachoma hospital was built in 1939, and today houses the Rock Mechanics and Explosives Research Center on S&T's campus.

During her short time in Rolla, Bengtson worked with animals and over 1500 human patients to isolate the bacteria causing the debilitating disease. She slowed the progression of the disease in over 1000 people, and, according to The Kansas City Star, Bengtson “made Rolla the chief American battle front in the war on” trachoma.

=== Toxins ===
She is also known for preparing, during 1935–1936, the standard for gas gangrene toxins and anti-toxins.

== Death ==
Ida Albertina Bengstson had a career lasting 30 years. She retired in 1946. She published and contributed substantially to the field of bacteriology and public health. Ida Bengstson died in 1952.
