= Tomlinson Fort Jr. =

Tomlinson Fort Jr. (April 16, 1932 – September 13, 2012) served as head of the Chemical Engineering departments at Carnegie Mellon and Vanderbilt University. Throughout a 40-year career in education, Fort served as Provost at Missouri–Rolla and Provost and Vice President of Cal Poly.

== Early life ==
Fort grew up in Athens, Georgia, where his father was Regents Professor and Head of the Mathematics Department at the University of Georgia. Fort attended Athens High and the University of Georgia, where he graduated in 1952. His great-grandfather Tomlinson Fort was elected to the 20th United States Congress.

While at Georgia, Fort was initiated into the Delta Chapter of the Sigma Chi fraternity. He is a member of the Order of Constantine, and during his career in education, he helped found Sigma Chi chapters at Missouri–Rolla and Cal Poly.

== Career ==
He served on the faculties at Case Western Reserve University, Carnegie Mellon University, the University of Missouri–Rolla and California Polytechnic State University before going to Vanderbilt in 1989. He was head of the Chemical Engineering departments at Carnegie Mellon and Vanderbilt and was Provost at the University of Missouri–Rolla and Provost and Vice President at Cal Poly.
