= Yahong Zheng =

Electrical engineer

Yahong Zheng is a professor at the Missouri University of Science and Technology in Rolla, Missouri. She was named Fellow of the Institute of Electrical and Electronics Engineers (IEEE) in 2015 for contributions to channel modeling and equalization for wireless communications.

== Education ==
Zheng received her B.S. in electrical engineering from the University of Electronic Science and Technology of China in 1987. She received an M.S. in electrical engineering from Tsinghua University in 1989.
