= Victoria Conkling-Whitney =

American lawyer

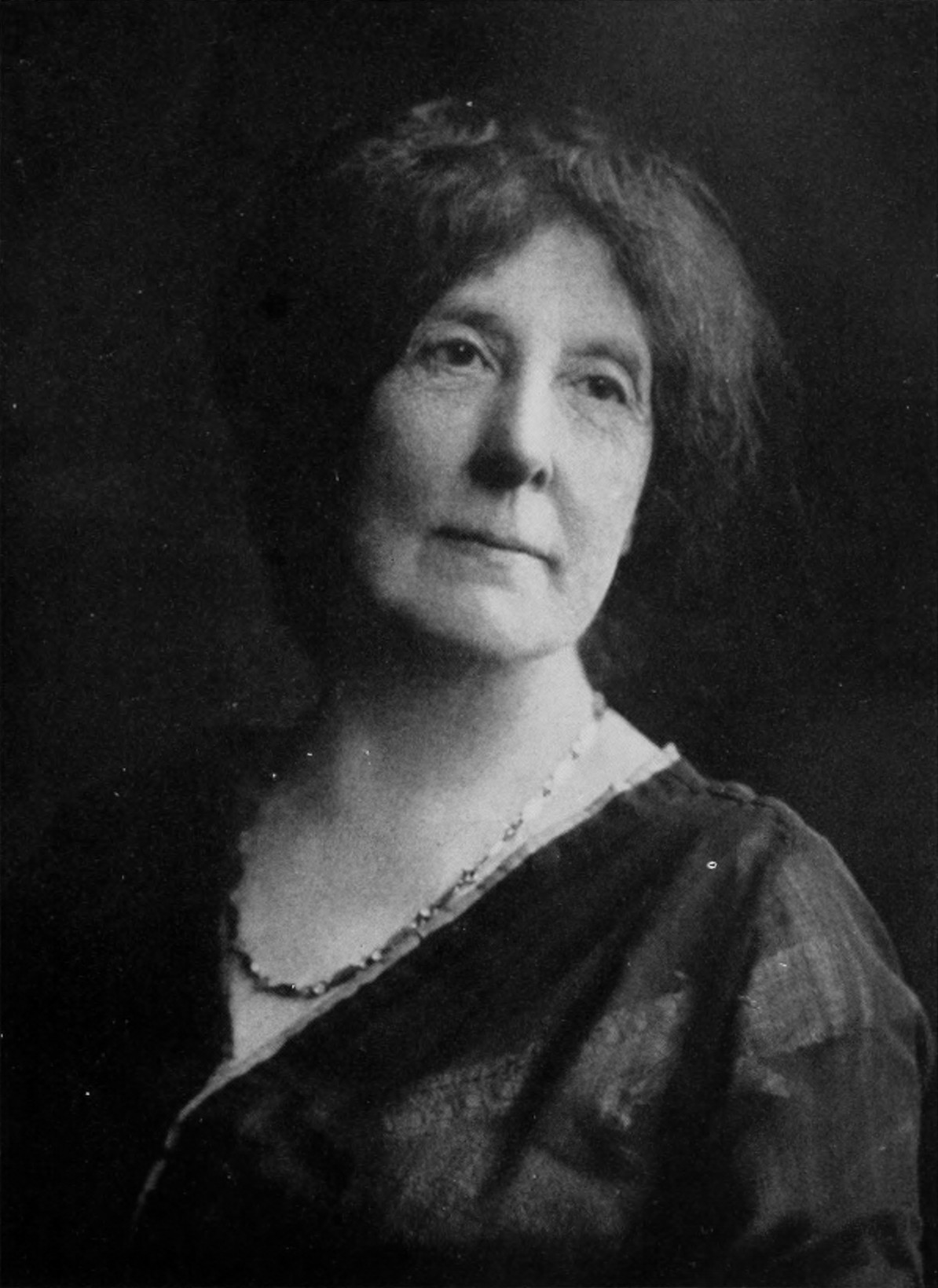
Victoria Conkling-Whitney

Victoria Conkling-Whitney (1843 - January 25, 1926) was the first woman attorney to practice before the St. Louis Court of Appeals. She said she studied law in self-defense, and urged all women to devote some time to this helpful branch of education. She organized the Woman's State Bar Association, when she was elected president. It was the first organization of its kind in the West, and the object was educational and for mutual improvement in the profession.

== Early life ==
Victoria Geraldine Conkling was born in either the latter half of 1842 or first half of 1843 near Columbus, Ohio. Received her earliest education in the university town of Westerville, Ohio. On the death of her father, David Conklin, an attorney, her mother, Cynthia A. Hill, also an attorney, brought her family to Missouri, where a brother had preceded them, and they made Missouri their home. Both her parents were of Colonial ancestry. She was of the seventh generation, on her mother's side, from John Alden and Priscilla De Molineux, who, with her father, mother and brother, all French Huguenots, came to New England with others of that immortal band, in the Mayflower, in 1620. William De Molineux was the tenth, and John Alden the seventh signer of the "Mayflower Compact," the first declaration of equal rights ever promulgated. The Conklins, members of the "Westchester line," came to New England about 1665. That they and their descendants were loyal to the principle of freedom is shown by the fact that there were 145 stalwart men of the Westchester and Long-Island lines of Conklins enrolled in the army and navy of the Revolutionary War. On her mother's side she numbers both the Adams, John Adams and John Quincy Adams, the Poet Henry Wadsworth Longfellow, Bryant, Major-General John Mason, for thirty years Commander-in-Chief of the Colonial Armies, and hero of the Pequot War. Major Daniel Mason also. Whitney was eligible to each and every Colonial and Revolutionary Society in the United States.

Victoria Conkling-Whitney's ancestry included a distinguished line of lawyers and statesmen on both sides, and therefore her love for law and politics was an inherited one. She was first admitted to practice in Kingman, Kansas. The examining board consisted of three lawyers appointed by the Judge of the Circuit Court; when it was announced in court that the report was ready to be made, the Judge suspended all proceedings, the chairman commending her examination to the women of Kansas as worthy of their emulation. After coming to St. Louis, Whitney went before the St. Louis Court of Appeals, and was the first woman ever admitted before it. Later the Supreme Court of her adopted State convened in special session to admit her to practice, adjourning immediately thereafter, when the entire bench with the Chief Justice offered congratulations. She was later, while on a business journey to Washington, introduced by the Hon. Belva Ann Lockwood to the Supreme Court of the District of Columbia, and they also convened in special session to admit her to practice. After this she went before the Supreme Court of New York, being presented by Gen. Roger Atkinson Pryor, himself a foremost member of the Supreme Judiciary. Her papers were prepared, and she took the oath the same day — a distinction not often conferred on applicants.

== Career ==
Having had some litigation in the courts over private property and finding that her ignorance of the law was likely to cause her to lose it, Victoria Conkling-Whitney took up the study and worked eight and ten hours a day until she passed the examination. Whitney said law was a difficult study; yet women would be successful because they were painstaking and conscientious and willing to put in unflinching application to study. Her opinion was that women's clubs and organizations would be spending their time more practically and beneficially by studying law instead of taking delicatessen doses of Browning and Mendelssohn. Women left with estates to manage or those owning property were entirely at the mercy of their attorneys. Whitney believed that law ought to be a part of the curriculum of every school as much as mathematics and literature. It would make woman less dependent and gave her self-confidence.

Whitney engaged in practice with her brother. Judge Conkling, in Missouri, but before relocating in St. Louis went to Washington and was admitted to practice before the Supreme Court of the United States, and the Department of the Interior.

One of her experiences was as a teacher in the Boonville public schools, and for a year a member of the faculty of the State University, Department School of Mines, in Rolla, Missouri. Her role was Assistant in Preparatory Department, and Recording Secretary. It was at this time she met her future husband, Professor Geordie Z. Whitney, Librarian.

Whitney believed in equal Suffrage, and as president of the regular Missouri Equal Suffrage Association, conducted four campaigns at Jefferson City, Missouri, for a constitutional amendment giving the women citizens of Missouri the right of franchise, herself drafting the amendinent which went unanimously to engrossment, but expired in the Senate with six hundred other bills at the close of the session. Whitney, with the chairman of the committee, had the honor of being invited to address the House of Representatives in Committee of the Whole, an honor which had never been conferred on any woman before save Dorothy Dix.

In 1900, in New York City, at a meeting of leading and representative women held at the Park Avenue Hotel, Whitney' helped to organize the National Legislative League, of which she was elected a member of the executive committee. To Lillie Devereux Blake, as leader, much credit is due for the passage of the many laws for the benefit of women now on the statute books of that state. The Missouri State Suffrage Association became an auxiliary to the National Legislative League in its organization. It was identical with and the successor to the first Equal Suffrage Association formed by Virginia Minor in 1864, including in its membership such names as James Yeatman, Benjamin Gratz Brown, Elizabeth Avery Meriwether, Mrs. Beverly Allen, Rev. W. W. Boyd, Rev. John Snyder, Sophronia Wilson Wagoner, and was the first organization to propose a movement to place women as members of the St. Louis School Board. During the Cuban War the association took an active part in the work for the soldiers. The association also sent delegates — Dr. H. T. Wilcox and Rev. John Snyder — to the first meeting held to organize the Good Roads Movement that grew into national importance.

Whitney's practice was in the civil courts. For a number of years she had in view the formation of a woman's bar association, and on July 14, 1912, organized the Woman's State Bar Association, when she was elected president. The meetings were held at the Planters Hotel. It was the first organization of its kind in the West, and the object was educational and for mutual improvement in the profession. An annual banquet was held, and eminent jurists were from time to time invited to give addresses before it. Among the laws it favored is to appoint a duly qualified woman lawyer for Judge of the Juvenile Court; in a strong measure it also favored prison reforms. Among its honorary members were Hon. Belva Lockwood, author of the bill admitting women to practice in the United States Supreme Court; Mrs. Marilla Ricker, who had an immense practice in Washington, and was the only living woman at the time who ever sat on the woolsack beside the Lord Chief Justice of England; Clara Shortridge Foltz, Assistant Prosecuting Attorney of Los Angeles, and Phoebe Couzins. Whitney was the vice-president of the Missouri International Peace Society, organized by the Princess Wizniewski (nee Hugo) and the Baroness Von Suttner.

== Personal life ==
On April 14, 1886, Victoria Conkling married Geordie Z. Whitney (1855-1889), Professor of Mathematics and Secretary of the Faculty at University of Missouri School of Mines.

She died on January 25, 1926, in New York.
