= Sajal K. Das =

American computer scientist

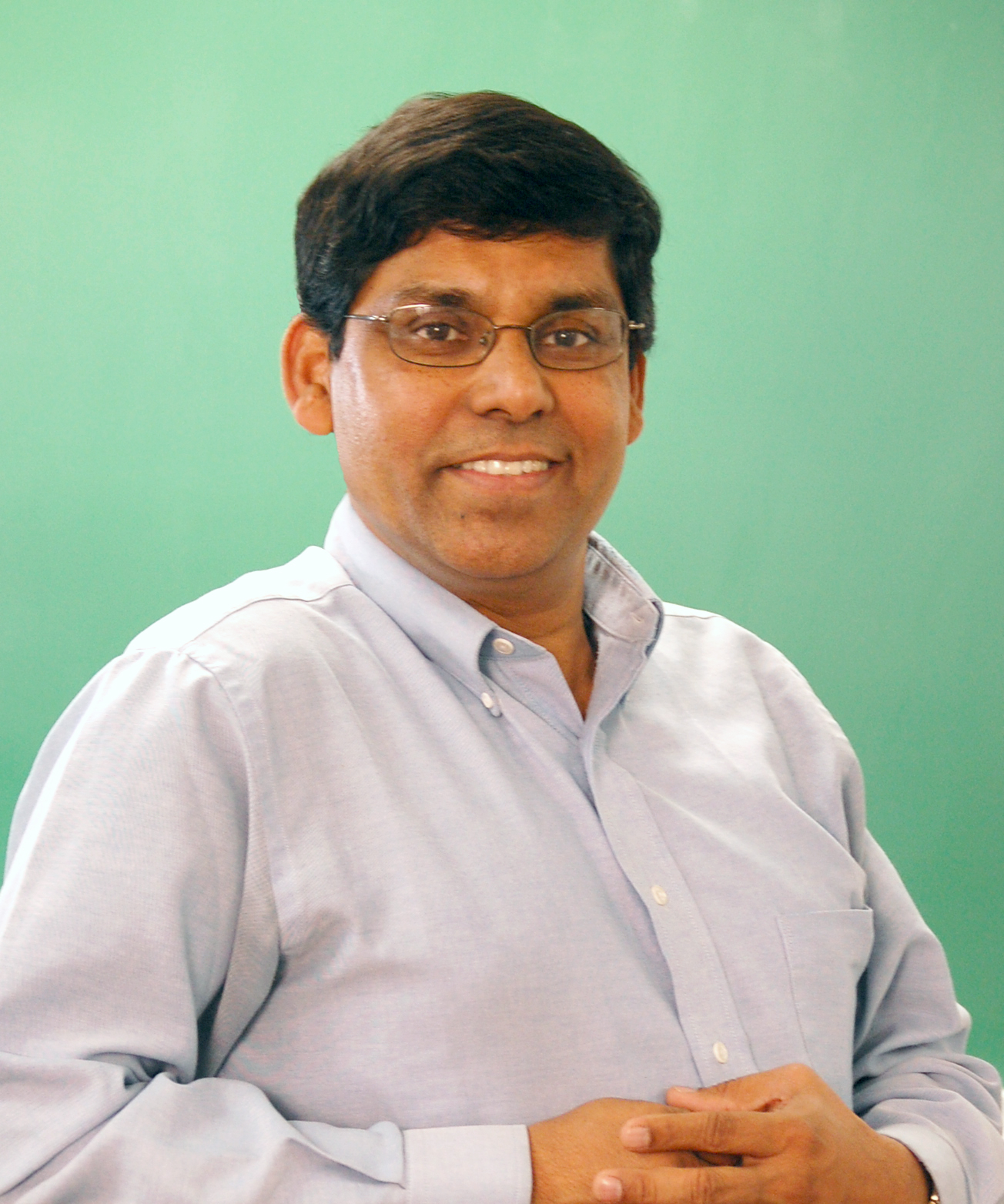
- Sajal K. Das
- Education: Calcutta University (B.S.), Indian Institute of Science in Bangalore (M.S.), University of Central Florida (PhD)
- Scientific career
- Fields: Computer Science; Wireless and Sensor Networks; Mobile and Pervasive Computing; Cloud Computing; Parallel Computing; Graph Theory; Applied Game Theory
- Workplaces: Missouri University of Science and Technology
- Thesis: Some Optimally Adaptive Parallel Graph Algorithms on EREW PRAM Model (1988)
- Doctoral advisor: Narsingh Deo

Dr. Sajal K. Das is currently a professor of Computer Science and the Daniel St. Clair Endowed Chair at Missouri University of Science and Technology (S&T), where he was the Chair of Computer Science Department during 2013–2017. Prior to that he was a University Distinguished Scholar Professor of Computer Science and Engineering and the founding director of the Center for Research in Wireless Mobility and Networking (CReWMaN) at the University of Texas at Arlington. During 2008-2011 he served the US National Science Foundation as a Program Director in Computer Networks and Systems division of the CISE Directorate. During 1988-1999 he was a faculty at the University of North Texas. His research interests include wireless and sensor networks, mobile and pervasive computing, parallel and cloud computing, smart and connected communities (smart city, smart home, smart grid, smart health, smart transportation, and smart agriculture), cyber-physical systems, Internet of Things (IoT), cyber-physical security, machine learning and data analytics, biological and social networking, applied graph theory and game theory. He has partaken in research related to wireless sensor networks and pervasive and mobile computing. He is a Fellow of the IEEE.

== Publications, patents and books ==
Das has published 350+ journal articles and 475+ peer-reviewed conference papers, gathering 34,300+ citations according to Google Scholar and 50 invited book chapters. He is one of the most prolific authors in computer science according to DBLP His current h-index is 91.

=== Books ===
- S. Roy and S. K. Das, Principles of Cyber-Physical Systems: An Interdisciplinary Approach, Cambridge University Press, 2020.
- S. K. Das, K. Kant and N. Zhang, Handbook on Securing Cyber-Physical Critical Infrastructure: Foundations and Challenges, Morgan Kaufmann, 2012.
- J. Cao and S. K. Das, Mobile Agents in Networking and Distributed Computing (Wiley Series in Agent Technology), John Wiley, 2012.
- D. J. Cook and S. K. Das, Smart Environments: Technology, Protocols and Applications, John Wiley, 2005.
