= Adrian, Pennsylvania =

Unincorporated community in Pennsylvania, US

- Unincorporated community
- Location within Pennsylvania
- Coordinates: 40°53′05″N 79°32′16″W
- Country: United States
- State: Pennsylvania
- County: Armstrong
- Township: East Franklin
- Elevation: 1,053 ft (321 m)
- Time zone: UTC-5 (Eastern (EST))
  - Summer (DST): UTC-4 (EDT)
- ZIP code: 16210
- Area code: 724
- GNIS feature ID: 1168083

Adrian is an unincorporated community in Armstrong County, Pennsylvania, United States. The community is 4.8 miles (7.7 km) north of Kittanning. Adrian has a post office with ZIP code 16210. Adrian, along with the rest of Armstrong County, is part of the Pittsburgh metropolitan area.

== History ==
Montgomeryville, Adrian P.O., appears in the 1876 Atlas of Armstrong County, Pennsylvania.
