= Jay Switzer (chemist) =

American chemist

Jay A. Switzer is an American chemist, currently the Curators’ Distinguished Professor and Donald L. Castleman/FCR Missouri Endowed professor of Discovery in Chemistry at the Missouri University of Science and Technology. Switzer received his BS degree in chemistry from the University of Cincinnati, and his PhD degree in inorganic chemistry from Wayne State University under Professor John F. Endicott. After receiving his PhD degree, he joined Union Oil Company of California (UNOCAL) as a senior research chemist. His research at UNOCAL was on photoelectrochemistry and the electrochemical processing of photovoltaic cells. In 1986, Switzer joined the Materials Science and Engineering Department of the University of Pittsburgh as an associate professor. In 1990, he moved to the University of Missouri, Rolla as a professor of chemistry. Switzer has spent most of his career working on the electrodeposition of nanostructured metal oxide semiconductors, magnetic materials, and catalysts. He is best known for his work on the electrodeposition of epitaxial metal oxides, oxide superlattices, chiral surfaces, and freestanding single-crystal metal foils. Switzer received the ECS Electrodeposition Research Award in 2003. He is a Fellow of AAAS, MRS, and ECS.
