= Jagannathan Sarangapani =

Jagannathan Sarangapani from the University of Missouri, Rolla, MO was named Fellow of the Institute of Electrical and Electronics Engineers (IEEE) in 2016 for contributions to nonlinear discrete-time neural network adaptive control and applications.
