= College of Humanities, Arts, and Social Sciences =

Coordinates: 33.9725°N 117.3312°W

The College of Humanities, Arts and Social Sciences (CHASS) at the University of California, Riverside (UCR) can trace its history to the founding undergraduate institution at UCR, the College of Letters and Science, which first opened in 1954. (During a consolidation period in the early 1970s, its natural science departments merged with UCR's College of Agriculture, founded in 1958, to form the College of Natural and Agricultural Sciences.) It is today a vibrant and critical research and teaching oriented community. Notable research centers include the Center for Bibliographical Studies and Research, the Center for Family Studies, the Ernesto Galarza Applied Research Center, and the Robert Presley Center for Crime & Justice Studies.

== California Center for Native Nations ==
UCR hosts the California Center for Native Nations, an interdisciplinary research institute dedicated to supporting research for and about Native nations, with emphasis on those communities within California. This center works in cooperation with the Costo Chair in American Indian Affairs, the Costo Archive of materials relating to American Indian Studies, and Native American Student Programs. UCR's History Department grants a master of arts degree as well as a doctorate in American Indian history, and the Ethnic Studies Department grants a bachelor of arts in Native American studies. Over 30 federally recognized Indian nations reside in Riverside County.

== Center for Bibliographical Studies and Research ==
Operates the "California Newspaper Project," which provides an online, searchable database of out-of-print historical newspapers: The San Francisco Call, from 1900 to 1910, and The Daily Alta California, from 1846 to 1891. Copies of the Amador Ledger, from 1900 to 1910, Imperial Valley News, from 1900 to 1910, and three years of the Los Angeles Herald will be added.

== See also ==
- List of University of California, Riverside people

== See also ==
- College of Letters and Science
