= Paul Worsey =

English mining engineer

Paul N. Worsey is an emeritus professor and well-known mining and explosives expert and researcher at the Missouri University of Science and Technology (formerly the University of Missouri-Rolla). Outside of teaching, research, and writing in his field, he is noted for creating and hosting the University's annual "Explosives Camp" for 16- and 17-year-old aspiring mining engineers. Since 2008, Worsey has been one of the host experts on the Discovery Channel documentary series, The Detonators.

== Background ==
Worsey obtained a Bachelor of Science degree from the University of Bristol in 1977. The following year he completed his Masters of Science degree in Rock Mechanics Excavation Engineering. In 1981 he obtained his Ph.D. in the field of Mining (Explosives) Engineering from Newcastle University. His dissertation was entitled: Geotechnical factors affecting the application of pre-split blasting to rock slopes. In the past 10 years his research has focused on the demilitarization of explosive ordnance.

He is the holder of several patents, including US Patent No. 4,754,705 for a blast control plug. "The device is designed to help keep explosive energy in blastholes when they detonate and thus more efficiently break rock and reduce environmental problems such as flyrock, airblast and ground vibrations."

He is also a certified British Parachute Association Instructor, having trained more than 1,000 students at the Sunderland Parachute Center.

== Explosives camp ==
The camp was first held in 2004 and hosted 20 students for the one-week course. By 2008 the camp was hosting 60 campers in three one-week residential camp sessions. It is currently restricted to students who can prove American citizenship, are at least 16 years of age or older, and considered "up and coming students" in their high school classes. The camp has been widely reported upon in such media outlets as the New York Times, National Public Radio (NPR), and the International Herald Tribune.

Camp curriculum includes:

In addition to blowing up chickens, the campers feel concussions from underground explosions, help generate a 150-foot water spout, experience demolition demonstrations and fashion fireworks displays. ... Many of the activities take place at Missouri S&T’s Experimental Mine. Each day, the campers participate in classroom instruction and safety training before initiating an explosion.

== Teaching ==
Worsey teaches a number of courses at the Missouri University of Science and Technology, including the following which he personally developed:

- Demolition of Buildings and Structures
- Principles of Explosives Engineering
- Commercial Pyrotechnics Operations
- Blasting Design and Technology
- Environmental Controls for Blasting
- Instrumentation for Explosives and Blasting

The Missouri University of Science and Technology is the only institution in the United States to offer a specific "explosives minor" and a "non-thesis masters" as part of its Explosives Engineering Program.

== Awards ==
- President's award from the International Society of Explosives Engineers

== Bibliography ==
Worsey is the author or co-author of numerous articles, primarily in peer reviewed journals in the field of engineering:

- Achelpohl, E., D. E. Day, and P. N. Worsey. 2001. Preliminary results of the detection and identification of glass microsphere taggants. Proceedings of the Annual Conference on Explosives and Blasting Technique I, : 265-272.
- Baird, J., and P. N. Worsey. 2002. The causes of armature surface fracturing within helical flux-compression generators. IEEE Transactions on Plasma Science 30, (5 I): 1647-1653.
- Baird, J., and P. N. Worsey. 2001. Surface fracturing of armatures within helical flux-compression generators. IEEE International Conference on Plasma Science.
- Baird, J., P. N. Worsey, and M. F. C. Schmidt. 2001. Effects of defects on armatures within helical flux-compression generators. IEEE International Conference on Plasma Science.
- Bowles, J., P. Worsey, R. Freeman, R. Hines, D. McCool, and C. Wolters. 2003. Blasting a new entrance to carroll cave. Proceedings of the Annual Conference on Explosives and Blasting Technique I, : 19-20.
- Giltner, Scott G., and Paul N. Worsey. 1986. BLAST MONITORING USING HIGH SPEED VIDEO RESEARCH EQUIPMENT. Proceedings of the Annual Conference on Explosives and Blasting Technique: 178-192
- Kristiansen, M., P. Worsey, and B. Freeman. 1999. Multidisciplinary university research program on explosive flux compression. Digest of Technical Papers-IEEE International Pulsed Power Conference 1, : 336-338.
- Lim, S., and P. Worsey. 2003. An investigation of the characteristics of linear shaped charges used in demolition. Proceedings of the Annual Conference on Explosives and Blasting Technique II, : 297-306.
- Neuber, A., J. Dickens, H. Krompholz, M. Kristiansen, M. Schmidt, J. Baird, and P. Worsey. 1999. Optical diagnostics on helical flux compression generators. Digest of Technical Papers-IEEE International Pulsed Power Conference 2, : 632-635.
- Neuber, A. A., J. C. Dickens, H. Krompholz, M. F. C. Schmidt, J. Baird, P. N. Worsey, and M. Kristiansen. 2000. Optical diagnostic on helical flux compression generators. IEEE Transactions on Plasma Science 28, (5): 1445-1450.
- Neuber, A. A., J. C. Dickens, H. Krompholz, M. F. C. Schmidt, J. Baird, P. N. Worsey, and M. Kristiansen. 2000. Optical diagnostics on helical flux compression generators. IEEE Transactions on Plasma Science 28, (5): 1440-1444.
- Randall, D. A., L. Kenchel, M. Schmidt, and P. Worsey. 2001. Automated explosives inventory database system. Proceedings of the Annual Conference on Explosives and Blasting Technique I, : 335-342.
- Skaggs, R. D., and P. N. Worsey. 1991. New innovative drilling bit for straighter blast holes and improved productivity. Proceedings of the Annual Conference on Explosives and Blasting Technique 2, : 221-229.
- Tariq, Syed M., and Paul N. Worsey. 1996. Investigation into the effect of varying joint aperture and nature of surface on pre-splitting. Proceedings of the Annual Symposium on Explosives and Blasting Research: 186-195.
- Tariq, Syed M., Paul N. Worsey, and John W. Wilson. 1996. Single decoupled blasthole tests and the significance of the results to presplitting and boulder busting. Proceedings of the Annual Symposium on Explosives and Blasting Research: 176-185.
- Weeks, B. L., J. Klosterman, and P. N. Worsey. 2001. Design of a hypersonic waterjet apparatus driven by high explosives. Review of Scientific Instruments 72, (8): 3482-3484.
- Wilkins, M. D., and P. N. Worsey. 1999. A study of the in hole processes involved during the loading and stemming of angled holes. Fragblast 3, (2): 111-125.
- Worsey, P., S. G. Giltner, T. Drechsler, R. Ecklecamp, and R. Inman. 1998. Formulation of production blasting criteria for the construction of a lime plant at a major crushed stone operation. Fragblast 2, (2): 181-194,.
- Worsey, P. N. 1984. EFFECT OF DISCONTINUITY ORIENTATION ON THE SUCCESS OF PRE-SPLIT BLASTING. Proceedings of the Annual Conference on Explosives and Blasting Technique: 197-217.
- Worsey, P. N., J. Baird, and M. Schmidt. 1999. Maximizing resolution of the high-speed photography of explosive-driven power generator (EDPG) armatures in operation. Digest of Technical Papers-IEEE International Pulsed Power Conference 2, : 1110-1113.
- Worsey, P. N., and S. G. Giltner. 1987. Economic and design considerations for explosive overburden casting. International Journal of Mining and Geological Engineering 5, (2): 93-108.
- Worsey, Paul N. 1986. UNDERSTANDING VIBRATIONS FROM MULTIHOLE BLASTS USING SHORT DELAY PERIODS. Journal of Explosives Engineering 3, (6): 25-28.
- Worsey, Paul N. 1985. IN SITU MEASUREMENT OF BLAST DAMAGE UNDERGROUND BY SEISMIC REFRACTION SURVEYS. Proceedings - Symposium on Rock Mechanics 2, : 1133-1140.
- Worsey, Paul N. 1985. MEASUREMENT OF BLAST INDUCED DAMAGE IN WALL ROCK FOR A SELECTION OF UNDERGROUND PERIMETER BLASTING TECHNIQUES. Proceedings of the Annual Conference on Explosives and Blasting Technique: 175-189.
- Worsey, Paul N., and Lawson J. Tyler. 1983. DEVELOPMENT CONCEPT OF THE INTEGRATED ELECTRONIC DETONATOR. Proceedings of the Annual Conference on Explosives and Blasting Technique: 489-496.
- Worsey, Paul, Scott G. Giltner, Terry Drechsler, Ron Ecklecamp, and Ronnie Inman. 1996. Vibration control during the construction of an in-pit lime kiln. Proceedings of the Annual Conference on Explosives and Blasting Technique 2, : 180-190.
- Wulfman, D. S., O. Sitton, F. T. Nixon, M. Podzimek, G. Worsey, D. Beistel, P. Worsey, D. Burch, and M. Johnson. 1997. Reformulation of solid propellants and high explosives: An environmentally benign means of demilitarizing explosive ordnance. Canadian Journal of Chemical Engineering 75, (5): 899-912.
