= Estella Atekwana =

American geophysicist

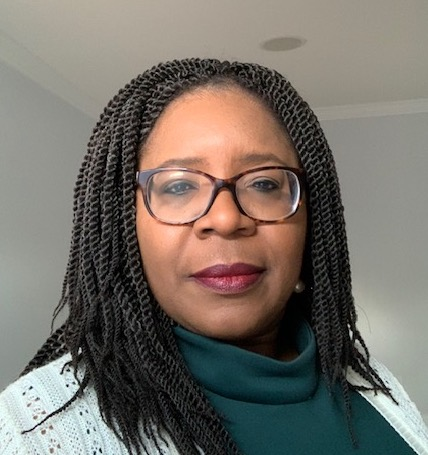
- Estella Atekwana in 2020
- Born: Estella Akweseh Nkwate; September 13, 1961 (age 64)
- Education: Howard University; Dalhousie University
- Scientific career
- Fields: Geophysics, Biogeophysics, Tectonics
- Workplaces: University of Delaware; Oklahoma State University
- Thesis: Gravity and magnetic interpretation of the Kapuskasing Structural Zone in the Val Rita and Groundhog River Blocks, northwestern Ontario, Canada (1990)
- Doctoral advisor: Matthew H. Salisbury

Estella Atekwana (née Estella Akweseh Nkwate; born 13 September 1961) is a geophysicist studying biogeophysics and tectonophysics. She is currently Dean of the College of Letters and Science, and also a Professor in the Department of Earth and Planetary Sciences at University of California, Davis. She previously served as Dean of the College of Earth, Ocean and Environment at the University of Delaware. She is also an adjunct professor at both the University of Waterloo and the Missouri University of Science and Technology. Before joining the University of Delaware in 2017, she was the Department Head of the Boone Pickens School of Geology at Oklahoma State University. She maintains an adjunct appointment. Atekwana has also been a faculty member at Missouri University of Science & Technology, Indiana University-Purdue University Indianapolis, and Western Michigan University. Atekwana has been a part of helping write many journals and has earned many awards and honors throughout her career. She's an elected member of American Academy of Arts and Sciences.

== Biography ==
Atekwana grew up in Cameroon and obtained her B.S. in Geology from Howard University in 1983 as a first-generation college student. At Howard University, Atekwana started in a pre-med program before switching to a geology major. After earning her B.S., Atekwana completed an M.S. in geology, also at Howard University in 1986. In 1991, Atekwana completed a Ph.D. in Geophysics at Dalhousie University in Halifax, Nova Scotia, Canada. After completing graduate school, she became an assistant professor at Western Michigan University. On a sabbatical in 1999, Atekwaka was a visiting professor at the University of Botswana. After leaving Western Michigan University in 2003, she taught at Indiana University – Purdue University Indianapolis and Missouri University of Science and Technology before starting at Oklahoma State University's Boone Pickens School of Geology in 2007.

Atekwana's efforts in diversity in the geosciences and capacity building in developing countries have been recognized with outstanding educator awards from both the Association for Women Geoscientists and the Society of Exploration Geophysicists. She serves on numerous professional committees including the American Geophysical Union (AGU) Honors and Awards committee and the U.S. National Committee for the International Union of Geological Sciences (IUGS).

== Research ==
While working toward their goal, a team of geophysicists including Atekwana set out to Air Force bases to examine the hydrocarbon-contaminated environments. The group tested many parts of land in hopes to find hydrocarbon reservoirs, but instead came across something that had never been thoroughly tested or identified, the ground was electrically conductive. The only conclusion to be drawn from the data was that electrical conductivity was caused by 'many different things'. During this experimental test, Atekwana found that geophysics, geochemistry and biogeochemistry were closely intertwined. This led her to establish biogeophysics.

Atekwana is a pioneer in the multidisciplinary field of Biogeophysics, which uses geophysics to understand the biogeochemical interactions occurring at contaminated sites. Atekwana's biogeophysical research investigates the effects of microbial-mediated processes on geological media. Some of her research evaluates the utility and resolution of in situ resistivity measurements combined with surface geoelectrical measurements to map contaminant distribution in the subsurface. Atekwana also uses the geoelectric and geophysical signatures of contaminated sites to investigate relationships between biological processes and their impact on electrical properties of geologic material.

Atekwana also uses geophysics to investigate tectonic processes. Her geophysical studies reveal crust and upper mantle structures that inform the geodynamic processes associated with incipient rifting of continental crust. For example, Atekwana and colleagues show how geophysically imaged pre-existing basement structures in Malawi and Botswana influenced strain localization during early rifting. Another case study from the nascent Okavango rift in northwest Botswana provides evidence that pre-existing basement structures control rifting.

Atekwana is involved in a project to use smartphones with geophysical sensors to potentially provide a more affordable approach to the acquisition of geophysical data, highlighting the application at academic institutions with limited access to expensive geophysical equipment.

== Works ==
Atekwana was involved in the writing of many geoscience journals such as:

- Bacterial Stern layer diffusion: experimental determination with spectral induced polarization and sensitivity to nitrite toxicity
- High-resolution magnetic susceptibility measurements for investigating magnetic mineral formation during microbial mediated iron reduction
- The Microbial Community Structure in Petroleum-Contaminated Sediments Corresponds to Geophysical Signatures

== Awards and honors ==
- Elected Member, American Academy of Arts and Sciences.
- Fellow, Geological Society of America.
- Fellow, American Geophysical Union.
- Reginald Fessenden Award from the Society of Exploration Geophysicists (2021).
- Society of Exploration Geophysicists 2020 Virtual Near Surface Global Lecturer.
- Association for Women Geoscientists 2019 Outstanding Educator.
- Outstanding Educator Award, Society of Exploration Geophysicists (2016).
- Elected Fellow of the Geological Society of America 2016.
- Eminent Faculty Award, Oklahoma State University (2015).

== Selected publications ==
Atewkana has written over 100 publications including:

- Kolawole, F.; Atekwana, E. A.; Laó-Dávila, D. A.; Abdelsalam, M. G.; Chindandali, P. R.; Salima, J.; Kalindekafe, L. (March 2018). "Active Deformation of Malawi Rift's North Basin Hinge Zone Modulated by Reactivation of Preexisting Precambrian Shear Zone Fabric". Tectonics. 37 (3): 683–704. Bibcode:2018Tecto..37..683K. doi:10.1002/2017TC004628.
- Atekwana, Estella A; Sauck, William A; Werkema, Douglas D (May 2000). "Investigations of geoelectrical signatures at a hydrocarbon contaminated site". Journal of Applied Geophysics. 44 (2–3): 167–180. Bibcode:2000JAG....44..167A. doi:10.1016/S0926-9851(98)00033-0.
- Atekwana, Estella A.; Atekwana, Eliot A. (4 November 2009). "Geophysical Signatures of Microbial Activity at Hydrocarbon Contaminated Sites: A Review". Surveys in Geophysics. 31 (2): 247–283. Bibcode:2010SGeo...31..247A. doi:10.1007/s10712-009-9089-8. S2CID 55399776.
- Atekwana, Estella A.; Slater, Lee D. (2009-12-31). "Biogeophysics: A new frontier in Earth science research". Reviews of Geophysics. 47 (4): RG4004. Bibcode:2009RvGeo..47.4004A. doi:10.1029/2009rg000285. ISSN 8755-1209.

Estella Atekwana serves as an associate editor for the American Geophysical Union's Journal of Geophysical Research - Biogeosciences and serves on the editorial advisory board of the Journal of African Earth Sciences
