= Second presidential transition of Donald Trump =

Transfer of presidential power from Joe Biden to Donald Trump

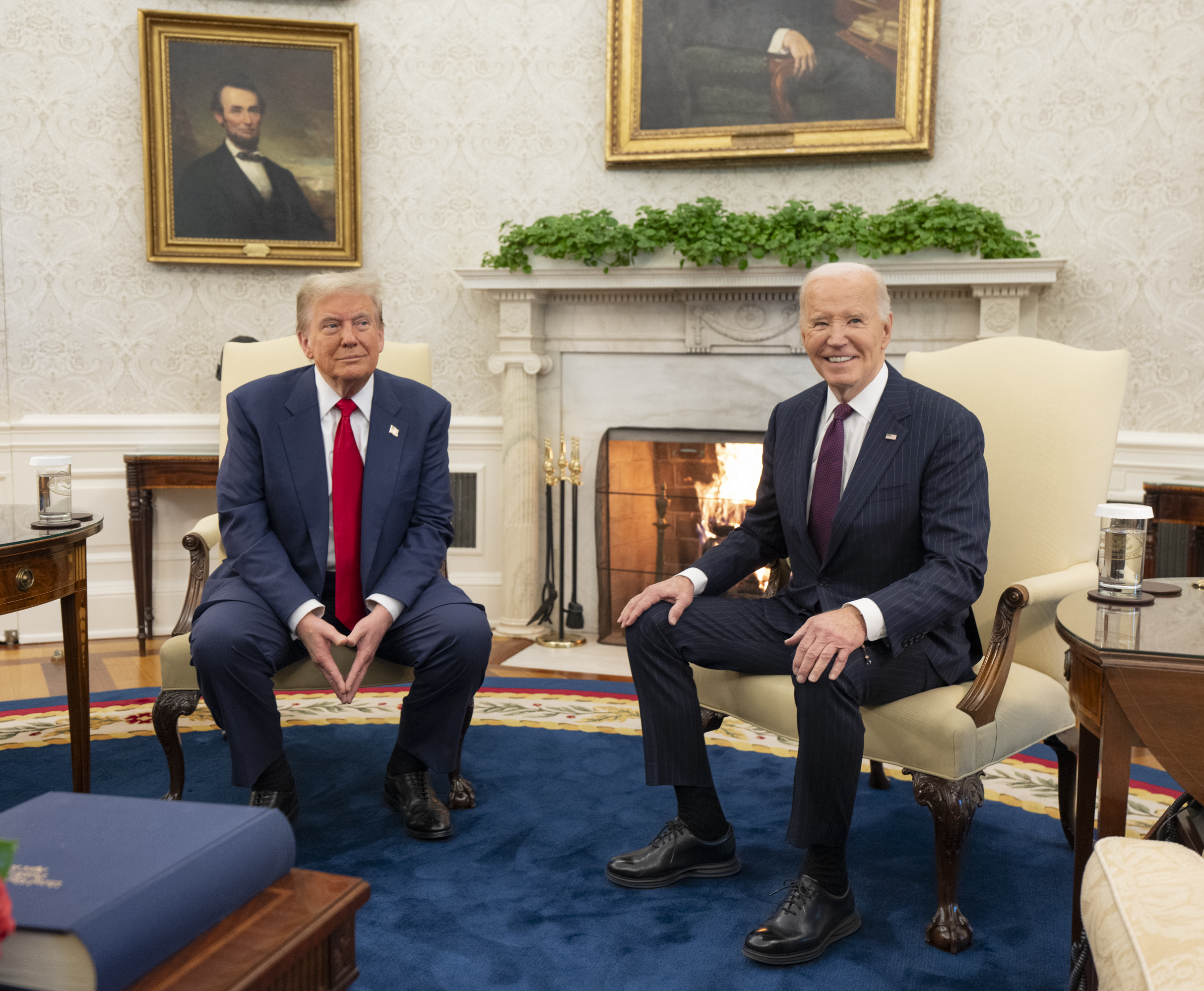
- President Joe Biden (right) meeting with President-elect Donald Trump (left) in the Oval Office of the White House on November 13, 2024
- Election date: November 5, 2024
- Transition start: November 6, 2024
- Inauguration date: January 20, 2025
- President-elect: Donald Trump (Republican)
- Vice president-elect: JD Vance (Republican)
- Outgoing president: Joe Biden (Democratic)
- Outgoing vice president: Kamala Harris (Democratic)
- Co-chairs: Linda McMahon; Howard Lutnick
- Honorary co-chairs: Robert F. Kennedy Jr.; Tulsi Gabbard; Donald Trump Jr.; Eric Trump; JD Vance

Donald Trump's second presidential transition began when he won the United States presidential election on November 5, 2024, and became the president-elect. Trump had become president-elect once the election results became clear on November 6, 2024, the day after the election. Trump was formally elected by the Electoral College on December 17, 2024. The results were certified by a joint session of Congress on January 6, 2025, and the transition concluded when Trump was inaugurated on January 20, 2025.

== Developments ==
Trump became his party's presumptive nominee on March 12, 2024, and formally accepted the nomination at the Republican National Convention in July. The Trump campaign announced the formation of the transition team on August 16, with Linda McMahon, Trump's former head of the Small Business Administration, and Howard Lutnick, the billionaire CEO of Cantor Fitzgerald and BGC Group, officially named as co-chairs. Vice presidential nominee JD Vance, along with sons Donald Trump Jr. and Eric Trump, were designated as honorary co-chairs. The effort beginning at this time was considered unusually late, as historically, most transition efforts start in the late spring.

On August 27, attorney Robert F. Kennedy Jr. and former congresswoman Tulsi Gabbard were also selected as honorary co-chairs, both of whom were former Democrats that had recently endorsed Trump. Kennedy had originally mounted an independent presidential bid before withdrawing from the race to endorse Trump, reportedly in exchange for a Cabinet position in his administration.

In October, The New York Times noted how Trump had refused to sign standard agreements around ethics and disclosure in order to begin key aspects of the transition process. The internal ethics pledges signed by Trump staff so far have been more lenient than standard pledges signed by Harris's transition team and the Trump team does not have to disclose its donors to the transition effort until Trump signs the agreements. Furthermore, the General Services Administration cannot supply any assistance such as office space or IT equipment until the agreements are signed, leading the Partnership for Public Service to call the delay a "tremendous and unnecessary" national security risk. In October, Politico reported on how potential conflicts of interest surrounding co-chair Howard Lutnick had created tension within the transition team and criticism of the transition effort. On November 24, Politico described Trump's refusal to accept federal transition assistance as a potential national security concern and "unprecedented in the modern presidential system". It highlighted their refusal as having "freed the Trump transition from having to abide by a $5,000 cap on donations and a requirement to disclose their donors".

On November 26, Trump signed a transition agreement that allows his staff to work with federal agencies and access information. Trump's transition team ruled out signing a memorandum of understanding with the General Services Administration, instead opting to use an independently drafted ethics plan; an agreement with the Department of Justice, which allows background checks and security clearances with the Federal Bureau of Investigation required for Senate confirmation of certain positions, was belatedly signed on December 3.

=== Beginning of transition process ===
President Joe Biden delivers a statement following the victory of Donald Trump.

In the early morning of November 6, major news outlets projected that Trump would win the 2024 presidential election. During her concession speech that evening, Vice President Kamala Harris committed to a peaceful transition of power. The following day, President Joe Biden appeared at a press event at the Rose Garden where he named "the steps he was taking" in coordinating a White House transition.

On November 9, in a statement from White House Press Secretary Karine Jean-Pierre, it was announced President-elect Donald Trump would meet with Biden the following Wednesday, at Biden's invitation. Trump and Biden met in the Oval Office on November 13 for slightly less than two hours, with both calling for a "smooth transition" and Trump expressing his appreciation for Biden's efforts. Trump's Mar-a-Lago became the center of the transition process, with job-seekers, media, and Trump friends and advisors filling the resort and nearby West Palm Beach hotels.

President-elect Trump began receiving the President's Daily Brief in November 2024.

=== International visit ===
The President-elect travelled on December 7 to Paris, France to attend the reopening of the restored Notre-Dame de Paris. At Élysée Palace, he had meetings with French president Emmanuel Macron and Ukraine president Volodymyr Zelenskyy. He also met William, Prince of Wales at the British Ambassador's Residence and Italian prime minister Giorgia Meloni, and had an official dinner at Élysée with many heads of state.

=== Costs ===
Trump chose not to accept public funds for the transition process, but said in November 2024 that "donors to the transition will be disclosed to the public". In November 2025, a Trump transition official reported that the transition team raised more than $14 million and spent close to that amount, but did not provide any details on how the money was spent. The list of 46 donors did not specify how much each donor contributed.

== Appointees ==
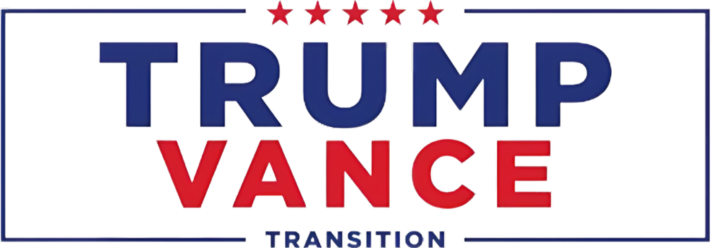
The transition team's common logo on documents

=== Announced ===
==== November ====
On November 7, Susie Wiles was announced as the White House Chief of Staff. She began her duties following Donald Trump's inauguration on January 20, 2025. She is the first woman to hold this position. Wiles had previously worked as a campaign manager for Trump's presidential campaigns in 2016, 2020, and 2024.

On November 9, it was reported that Robert Lighthizer would be re-appointed to the role of US Trade Representative. Four days later, it was reported that Lighthizer would instead likely take the White House position of "trade czar".

On November 10, Trump announced that Tom Homan, who previously served as the acting director of ICE in the last Trump administration, would be appointed "border czar" with full oversight of border controls north and south of the US. Aside from the positions listed below, Trump has also nominated as key White House staffers former Cabinet Secretary Bill McGinley as his next White House Counsel and real estate investor Steve Witkoff as his special envoy to the Middle East.

On November 11, it was announced that New York Congresswoman and House Republican Conference Chair, Elise Stefanik, would be appointed as the United States ambassador to the United Nations. That same day, former New York Congressman and nominee for governor Lee Zeldin was announced to be Trump's nominee for Administrator of the Environmental Protection Agency and Florida Representative Mike Waltz as National Security Advisor. Stephen Miller was named White House Deputy Chief of Staff for Policy. Miller served as a senior adviser and lead speechwriter in the first Trump administration.

On November 12, Trump named former Arkansas governor Mike Huckabee as his nominee for United States Ambassador to Israel. Trump also named Vivek Ramaswamy and Elon Musk to lead a new Department of Government Efficiency, a non-governmental partner of the Office of Management and Budget and likely a presidential advisory commission to lead structural reform in government; South Dakota Governor Kristi Noem as nominee for Secretary of Homeland Security; former Director of National Intelligence and former Texas Congressman John Ratcliffe as nominee for Director of the Central Intelligence Agency; and Army National Guard veteran and Fox News commentator Pete Hegseth as nominee for Secretary of Defense.

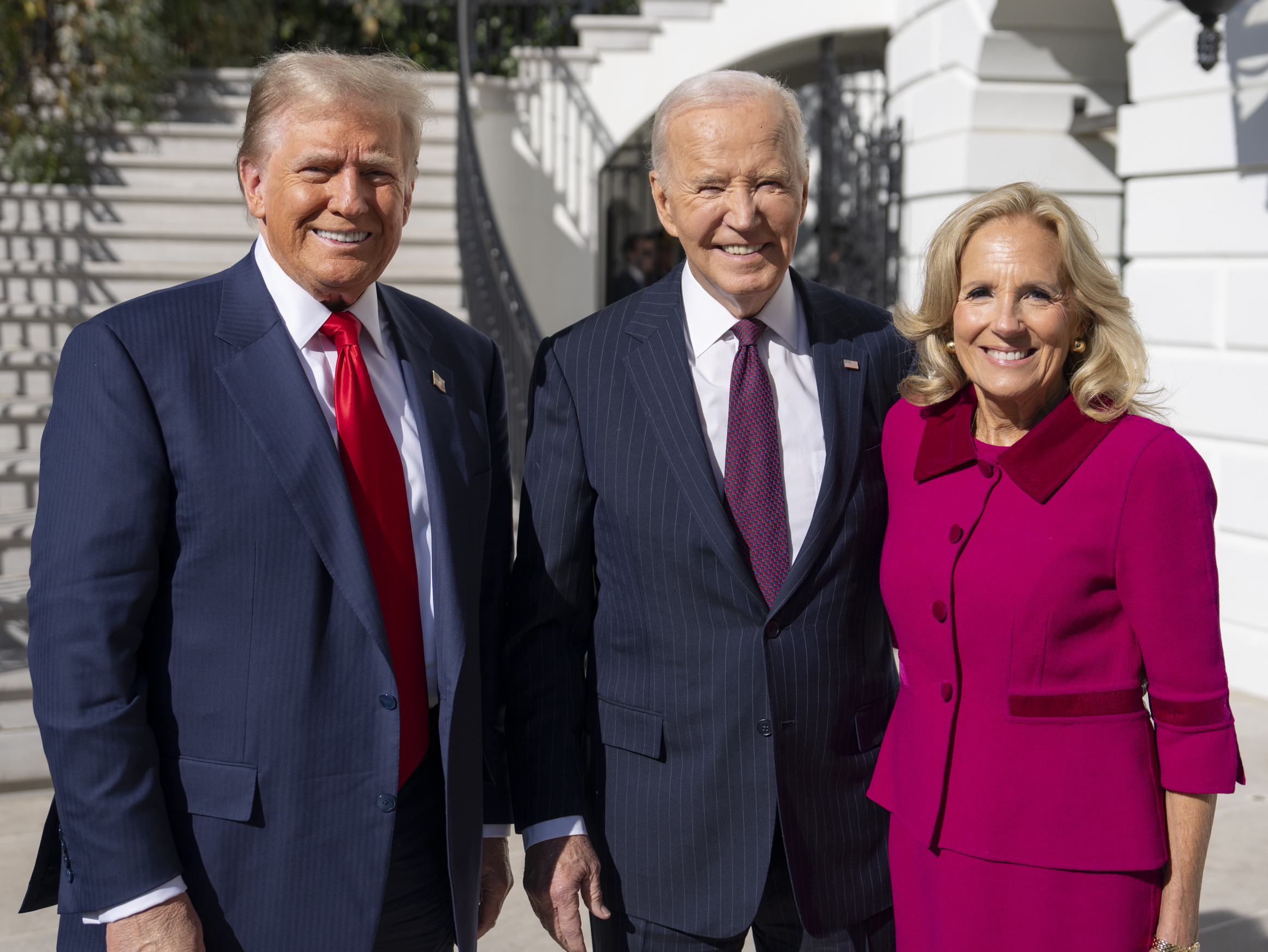
President Joe Biden and First Lady Jill Biden greet President-elect Donald Trump, Wednesday, November 13, 2024, on the South Portico of the White House.

On November 13, Trump announced his nominee for Director of National Intelligence to be former Democratic Hawaii Representative Tulsi Gabbard. On the same day, lawyer and Florida Representative Matt Gaetz was named as Trump's nominee for Attorney General, who later that day announced his resignation from Congress, effective immediately. Gaetz was notably previously investigated by the Department of Justice and was the subject of a House Committee on Ethics probe for allegedly violating federal sex trafficking laws, until his resignation ended the probe. The Department of Justice ended its case in 2023, declining to bring charges against Gaetz. Trump also nominated Florida Senator Marco Rubio for Secretary of State.

On November 14, Trump nominated former 2024 presidential candidate, environmental lawyer and anti-vaccine activist Robert F. Kennedy Jr. for Secretary of Health and Human Services. He is the son of former attorney general Robert F. Kennedy and nephew of President John F. Kennedy. Former Georgia congressman Doug Collins was nominated to be Secretary of Veterans Affairs. North Dakota Governor Doug Burgum was nominated for Secretary of the Interior. Former New York prosecutor Todd Blanche was nominated for Deputy Attorney General. Emil Bove, former assistant US Attorney in New York, was nominated to be Principal Associate Deputy Attorney General. Dean John Sauer, former Solicitor General of Missouri, was nominated to be Solicitor General of the United States. Jay Clayton, former chairman of the U.S. Securities and Exchange Commission, was nominated as United States Attorney for the Southern District of New York.

On November 15, The Wall Street Journal reported that Trump was considering Fox Business host and former director of the National Economic Council Larry Kudlow for a "senior economic role", and Trump announced that Steven Cheung and Sergio Gor would serve as White House communications director and personnel director, respectively. Also, Trump, in a statement, confirmed that alongside his nomination for Secretary of the Interior, Doug Burgum would serve as Energy Czar, "chairman of the newly formed, and very important, National Energy Council which will consist of all departments and agencies involved in the permitting, production, generation, distribution, regulation, transportation of all forms of American energy." Former press secretary of Trump's third presidential campaign Karoline Leavitt was confirmed as White House Press Secretary, the youngest to ever be appointed to this position.

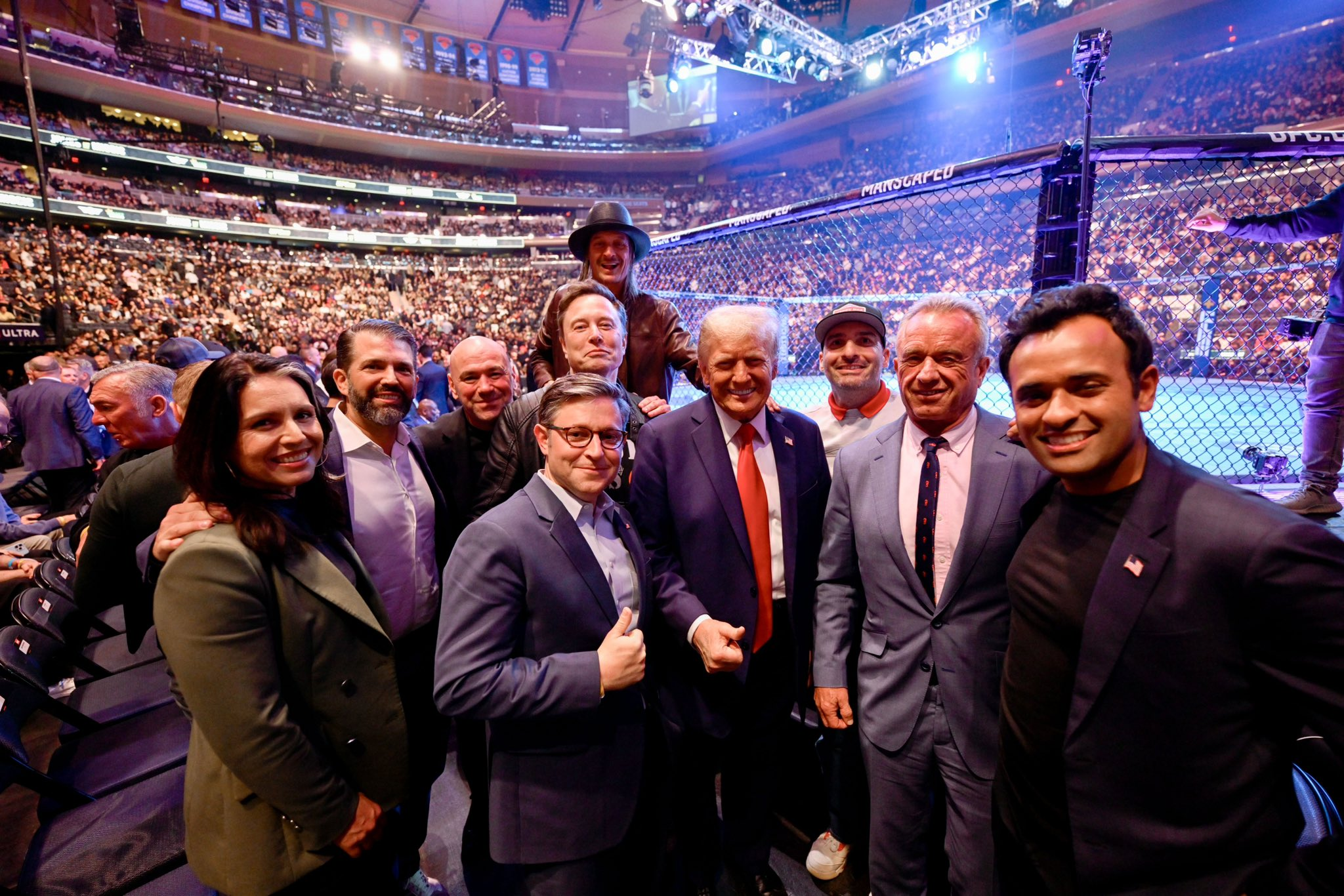
Donald Trump at a UFC fight on November 16, 2024, with Elon Musk, Tulsi Gabbard, RFK Jr, Mike Johnson, and Vivek Ramaswamy

On November 16, Trump announced Chris Wright, the chief executive of oil and natural gas fracking services company Liberty Energy as his nominee for Secretary of Energy. He also announced that Wright will also serve as part of the new National Energy Council. Wright has acknowledged the link between burning fossil fuels and climate change but has expressed doubt that climate change is linked to worsening extreme weather. A staunch supporter of fossil fuels in public interviews, he considers them necessary to lift the developing world out of poverty.

On November 17, Trump announced Brendan Carr, a commissioner on the Federal Communications Commission, to lead the commission. Carr was notably the author of the section regarding communications in the Project 2025 initiative.

On November 18, Trump announced his intention to nominate former Wisconsin Representative Sean Duffy for Secretary of Transportation.

On November 19, Trump announced he would be nominating Howard Lutnick to be Secretary of Commerce and surgeon Mehmet Oz, known for being the host of The Dr. Oz Show, to be Administrator of the Centers for Medicare & Medicaid Services. That day, CNN reported that Linda McMahon would be nominated for Secretary of Education.

On November 20, former Attorney General Matthew Whitaker and first-term Ambassador to the Netherlands Pete Hoekstra were nominated to be the NATO ambassador and Ambassador to Canada, respectively.

On November 21, former Representative Matt Gaetz announced his withdrawal from consideration as Trump's Attorney General pick, reportedly due to lack of support for his nomination in the Senate. Former Florida Attorney General Pam Bondi was announced as the new nominee for Attorney General.

On November 22, Trump announced he would nominate Scott Bessent, the founder of the macro hedge fund Key Square Group, for the position of Treasury Secretary; Oregon congresswoman Lori Chavez-DeRemer for the position of Secretary of Labor; former NFL player and former Texas State Representative Scott Turner for Secretary of Housing and Urban Development; Fox News contributor Janette Nesheiwat for Surgeon General; Russell Vought for Director of the Office of Management and Budget; surgeon Marty Makary for Commissioner of the FDA; and former Florida representative Dave Weldon for director of the CDC.

On November 23, Trump nominated the former director of the Domestic Policy Council, Brooke Rollins, to serve as Secretary of Agriculture.

On November 26, Trump nominated John Phelan to be Secretary of the Navy; former SENS Research Foundation CEO Jim O'Neill was nominated to be Deputy Secretary of Health and Human Services; Jay Bhattacharya was nominated to be Director of National Institutes of Health; and former Chief of Staff to the US Trade Representative Jamieson Greer was nominated to be the United States Trade Representative.

On November 27, Trump announced that retired Army general Keith Kellogg would serve as his special envoy to Ukraine and Russia.

On November 30, Trump nominated Kash Patel to be the new FBI Director; Hillsborough County Sheriff Chad Chronister for DEA Administrator; and Kushner Companies founder Charles Kushner, father of Trump's son-in-law Jared Kushner, for Ambassador to France. Chronister withdrew his name from consideration on December 3, citing the "gravity" of the job.

==== December ====
On December 1, Trump announced Lebanese-American businessman and Tiffany Trump's father-in-law Massad Boulos as the Senior Advisor to the President on Arab and Middle Eastern Affairs.

On December 4, Trump nominated former Missouri Representative Billy Long for IRS Commissioner; former Georgia Senator Kelly Loeffler to be the Administrator of the Small Business Administration; his personal lawyer David Warrington to replace Bill McGinley as White House Counsel (McGinley would instead serve as advisor to the Department of Government Efficiency); Fiserv CEO Frank Bisignano to be the Commissioner of the Social Security Administration; Iraq veteran and 2020 North Carolina congressional candidate Daniel P. Driscoll for Secretary of the Army; tech entrepreneur and commercial astronaut Jared Isaacman for Administrator of NASA; former CEO of the U.S. International Development Finance Corporation and current CEO of Rubicon Founders Adam Boehler for Special Presidential Envoy for Hostage Affairs; economist Peter Navarro for Senior Counselor for Trade and Manufacturing; Professor Michael Faulkender for Deputy Treasury Secretary; former United States Assistant Secretary of the Treasury for Public Affairs Monica Crowley for Chief of Protocol; former Commissioner of the Securities and Exchange Commission Paul S. Atkins for Chairman of the SEC and JD Vance's policy advisor Gail Slater for Assistant Attorney General for the Antitrust Division.

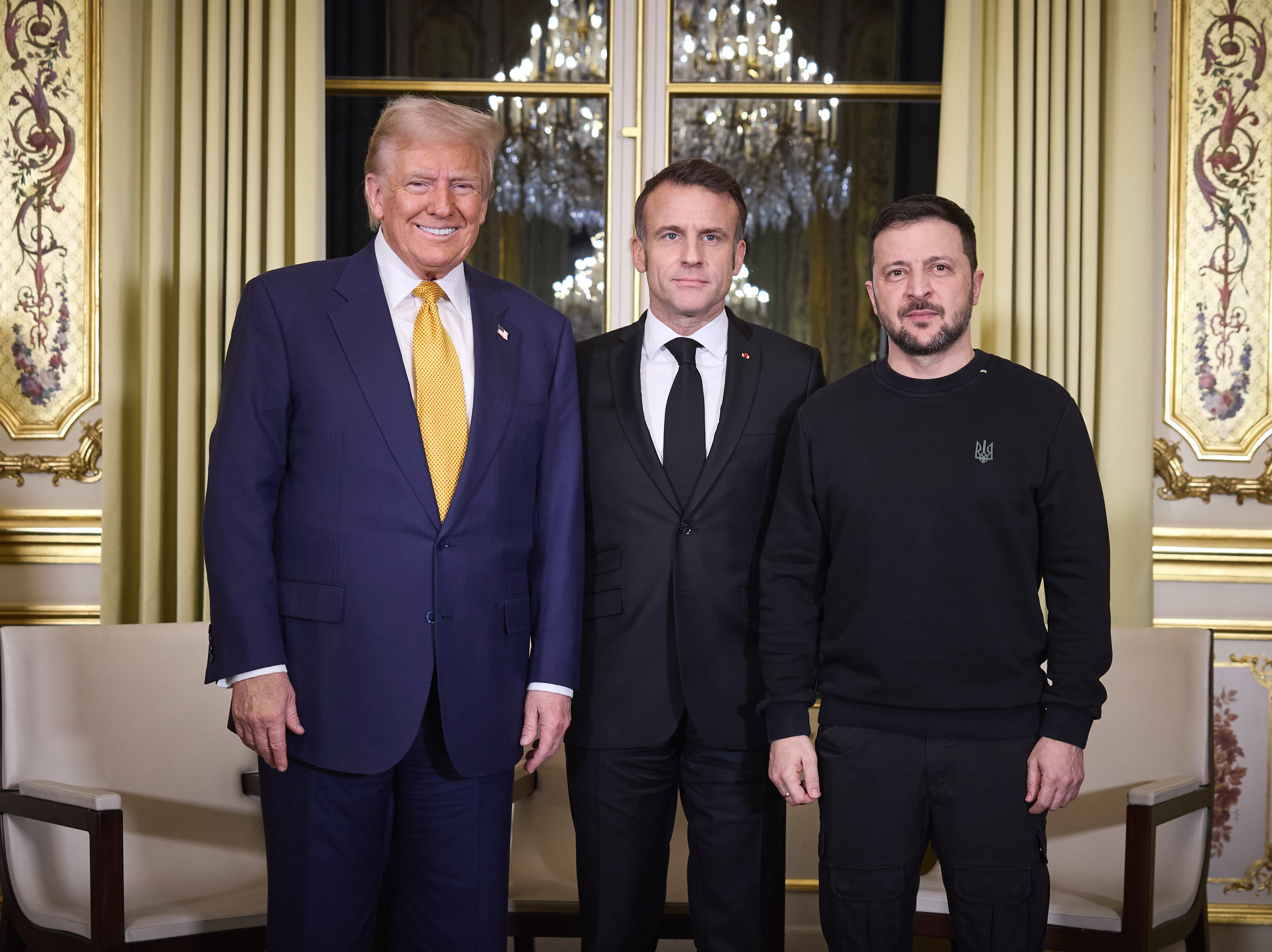
Donald Trump with Ukrainian President Volodymyr Zelenskyy and French President Emmanuel Macron in Paris, France, on December 7, 2024

On December 5, Trump nominated ICE Assistant Director of the Office of Firearms and Tactical Programs Caleb Vitello as Director of ICE; Rodney Scott for Chief of Customs and Border Protection; former president of the Border Patrol Union Brandon Judd for Ambassador to Chile; former Georgia Senator David Perdue for Ambassador to China; David O. Sacks for Cryptocurrency and Artificial Intelligence Czar; and Special Agent in Charge for Homeland Security Investigations in Miami Anthony Salisbury as Deputy Homeland Security Advisor.

On December 8, Trump announced lawyer Alina Habba as Counselor to the President and former Ambassador to Mexico, Christopher Landau as the United States Deputy Secretary of State.

On December 10, Trump nominated Andrew N. Ferguson to be Chair of the Federal Trade Commission; former Ambassador to El Salvador Ronald D. Johnson to be Ambassador to Mexico; former First Lady of San Francisco and former Fox News host Kimberly Guilfoyle to be Ambassador to Greece; Executive Chairman of Colony Capital Tom Barrack to be Ambassador to Turkey; commissioner for the U.S.-China Economic and Security Review Commission Jacob Helberg for Under Secretary of State for Economic Growth, Energy, and the Environment and North Carolina Congressman Dan Bishop to be deputy director of the Office of Management and Budget.

On December 11, Trump nominated Florida attorney Dan Newlin for Ambassador to Colombia; Florida physician and businessman Peter Lamelas for Ambassador to Argentina; and Leandro Rizzuto Jr. as Ambassador to the Organization of American States. Trump also announced his preference for former KSAZ-TV anchor Kari Lake to be the next director of Voice of America (VOA). The VOA director is not directly selected by the President, but rather by the CEO of the U.S. Agency for Global Media, a role which requires Senate confirmation.

On December 14, Trump nominated former Ambassador to Germany and Director of National Intelligence Richard Grenell for Presidential Envoy for Special Missions; former Los Alamitos Mayor Troy Edgar for Deputy Homeland Security Secretary; founder and CEO of Constellations Group Bill White for Ambassador to Belgium; founder of The Walsh Company, Walsh Environmental Solutions, and Walsh PoE Lighting Edward Walsh for Ambassador to Ireland; and former California congressman Devin Nunes as Chair of the President's Intelligence Advisory Board.

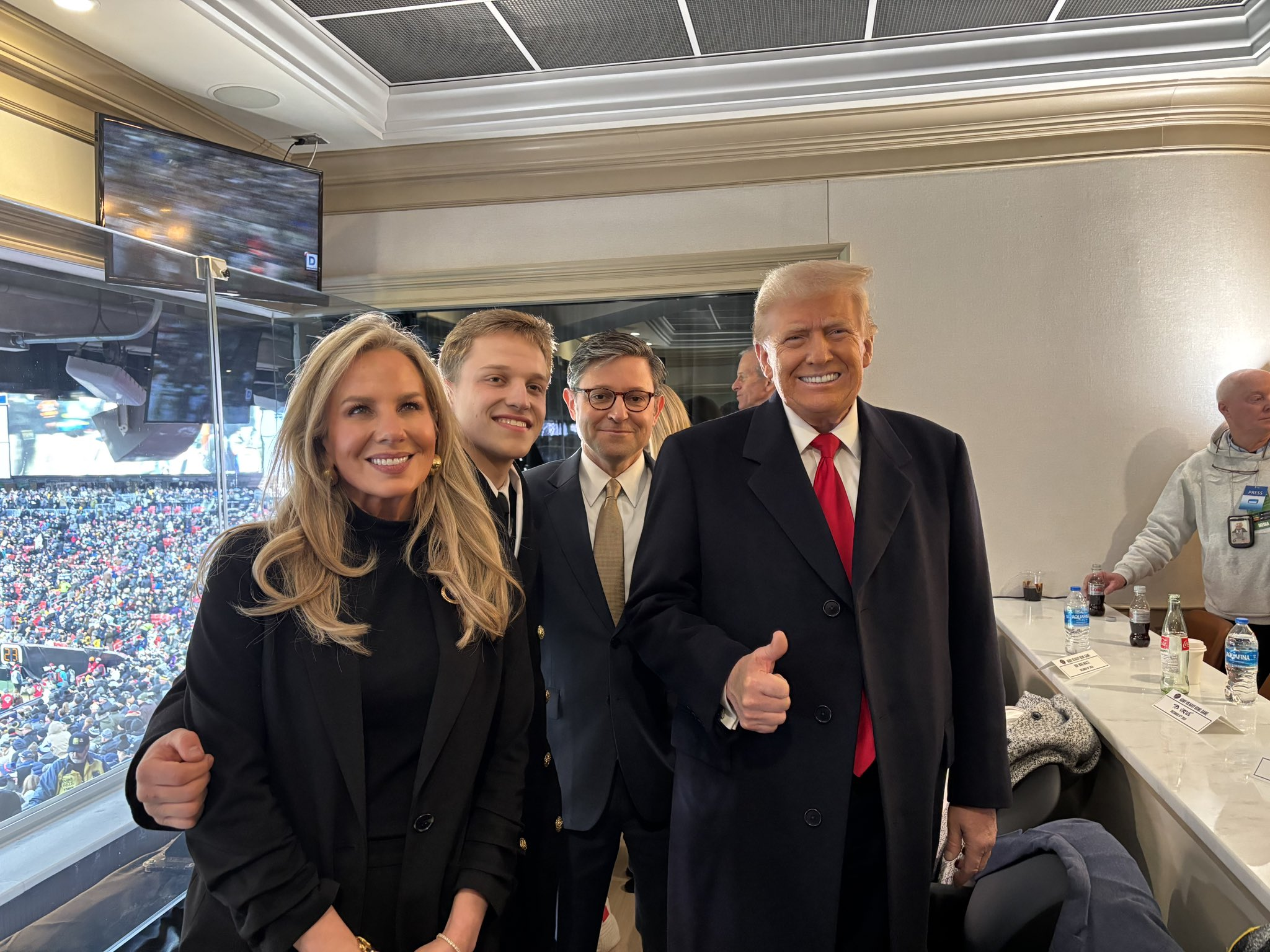
Trump and Johnson at the Army–Navy Game on December 14, 2024

On December 16, Trump nominated former CIA case worker Leah Campos for Ambassador to the Dominican Republic. She is the sister of Fox & Friends Weekend co-host Rachel Campos-Duffy, wife of Sean Duffy. Trump also nominated President of Brevard-based Fisher Realty Arthur Fisher for Ambassador to Austria; Broadway producer and board member of the Women Founders Network Stacey Feinberg for Ambassador to Luxembourg; former Ambassador to Portugal George Edward Glass for Ambassador to Japan; and Lou Rinaldi for Ambassador to Uruguay.

On December 17, Trump nominated 2022 U.S. Senate candidate in Georgia and former NFL player Herschel Walker for Ambassador to the Bahamas; and Nicole McGraw for Ambassador to Croatia.

On December 21, Trump nominated former MGM chairman and producer Mark Burnett as Special Envoy to the United Kingdom; former top Department of Homeland Security attorney Chad Mizelle for Chief of Staff at the Department of Justice (Mizelle being the husband of Trump-appointed Florida federal judge Kathryn Kimball Mizelle); Texas Senator Ted Cruz's Chief of Staff Aaron Reitz as head of DOJ's Office of Legal Counsel; former Pan Am Railways President David Fink for Administrator of the Federal Railroad Administration; Landry's CEO and Houston Rockets owner Tilman Fertitta for Ambassador to Italy and Ambassador to San Marino; and CatholicVote President Brian Burch for Ambassador to Vatican City.

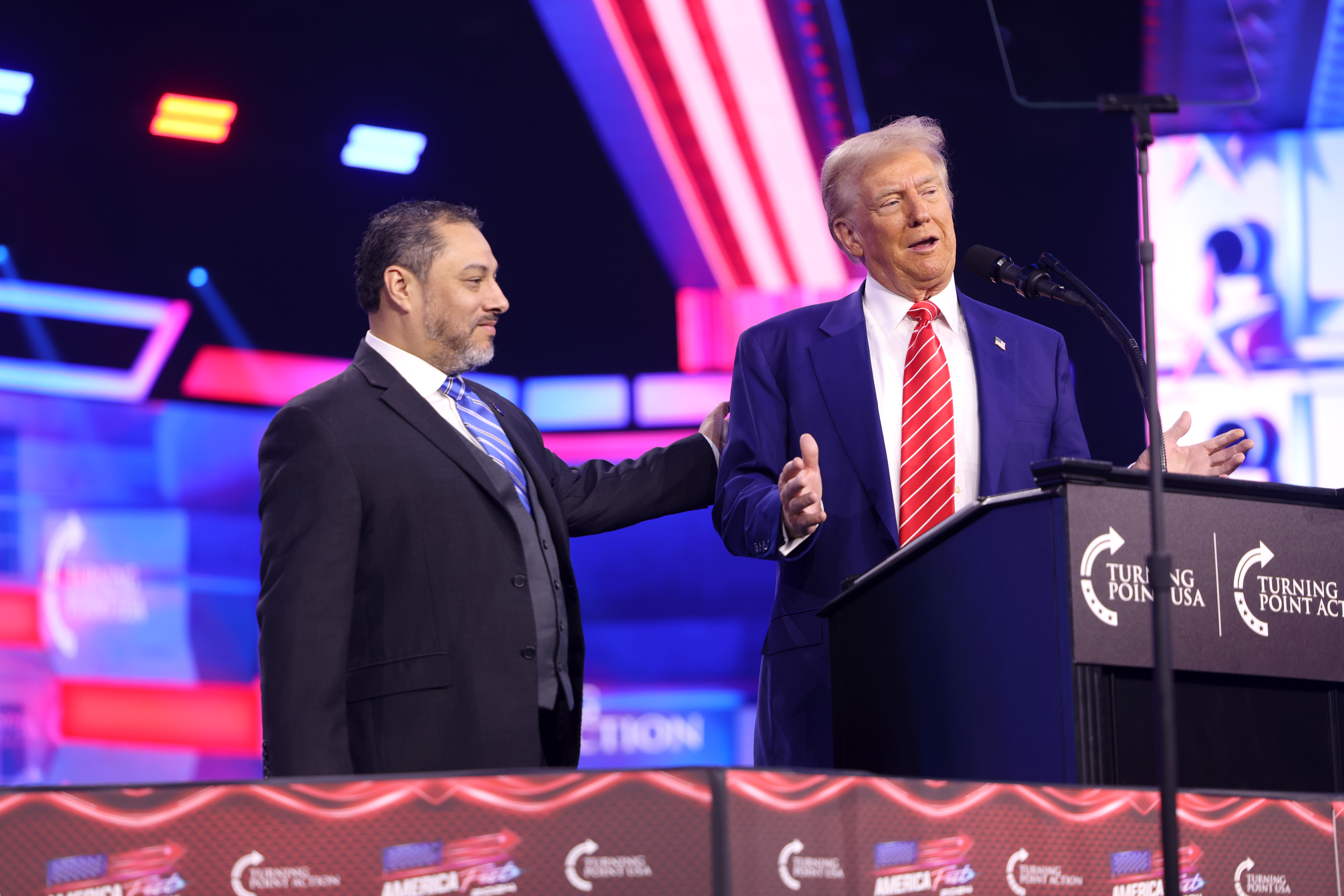
Trump with National Border Patrol Council President Paul Perez in Phoenix, Arizona, December 22, 2024

On December 22, Trump nominated former Ambassador to the Vatican Callista Gingrich for Ambassador to Switzerland and Liechtenstein; she is the wife of former House Speaker and 2012 Republican presidential candidate Newt Gingrich. He also nominated former Ambassador to Sweden Ken Howery for Ambassador to Denmark; former president of the Inter-American Development Bank Mauricio Claver-Carone, as special envoy for Latin America; Hewlett Packard Vice President Scott Kupor for Director of Office of Personnel Management; 2022 North Carolina congressional candidate Bo Hines for executive director of his new proposed crypto advisory council; former Uber executive Emil Michael as Under Secretary of Defense for Research and Engineering; businessman Stephen Feinberg for Deputy Secretary of Defense; Project 2025 Author Elbridge Colby for Undersecretary of Defense for Policy, he is also the grandson of former Director of Central Intelligence William Colby; and Stephen Miran for Chair of the Council of Economic Advisers.

On December 24, Trump nominated Arrigo Automotive Group Vice President John Arrigo for Ambassador to Portugal; and philanthropist Somers Farkas for Ambassador to Malta.

On December 25, Trump nominated Miami-Dade County Commissioner Kevin Marino Cabrera for Ambassador to Panama.

==== January ====
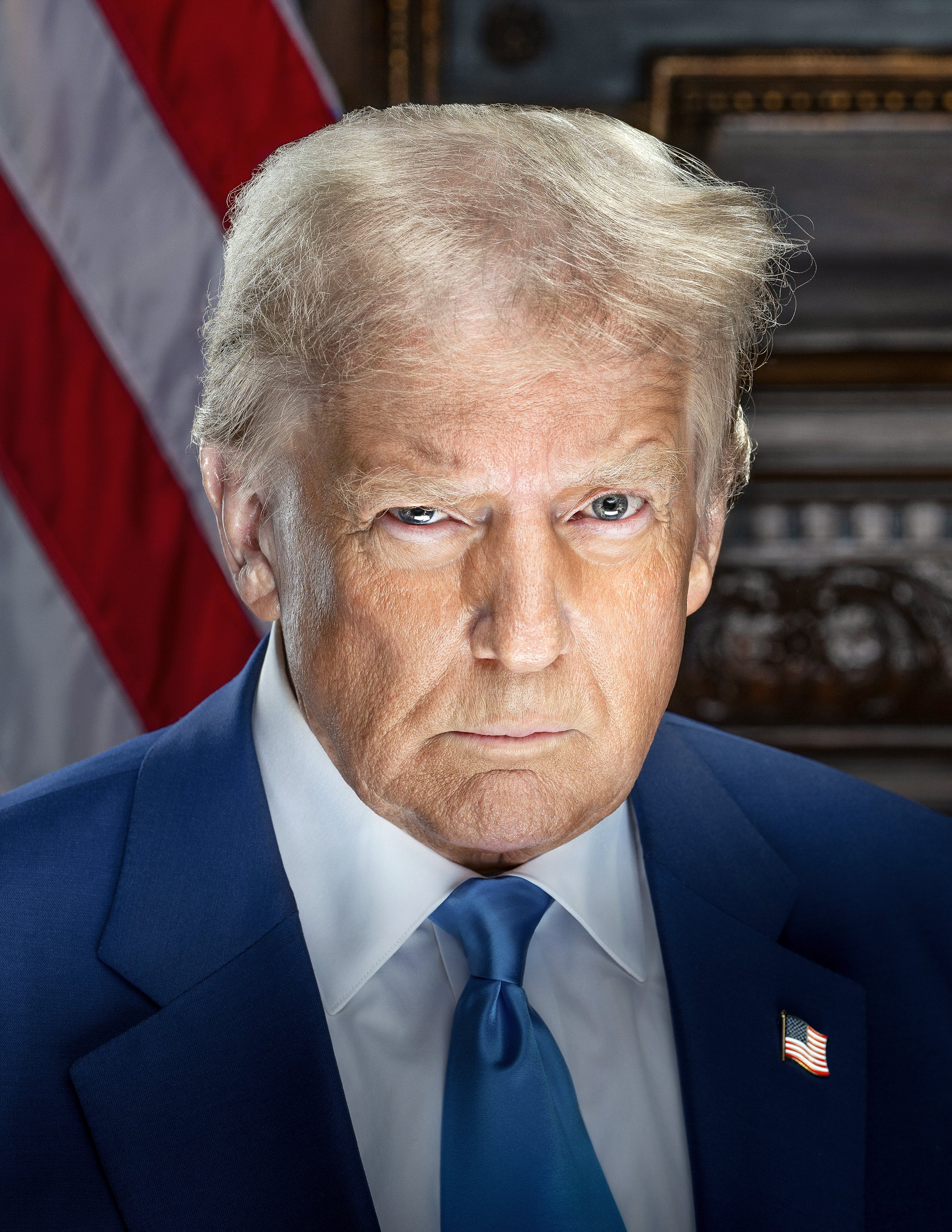
Trump's inaugural portrait, taken in January 2025 by Daniel Torok

On January 2, Trump nominated Charles and Potomac Capital CEO Joe Popolo to be Ambassador to the Netherlands; León Medical Centers founder Benjamin Leon to be Ambassador to Spain; and Ken Kies for Assistant Treasury Secretary For Tax Policy; Alexandra Preate for senior counsel to the Treasury Secretary Scott Bessent, David Katz for Treasury Chief of Staff, Cora Alvi and Samantha Schwab for Treasury Deputy Chief of Staff, granddaughter of founder, chairman, and former CEO of Charles Schwab Corporation Charles R. Schwab, and Hunter McMaster for Director of Policy Planning, nephew of South Carolina Governor Henry McMaster.

On January 3, Trump nominated Morgan Ortagus as his deputy special envoy to the Middle East; Roman Pipko for Ambassador to Estonia; and Tammy Bruce for Spokesperson for the Department of State.

On January 6, Trump nominated Nassau County Judge Joseph Nocella Jr. as United States Attorney for the Eastern District of New York.

On January 7, Trump announced that he intends to fire Colleen Joy Shogan, chief Archivist of the National Archives and Records Administration.

On January 9, Trump nominated Pennsylvania Republican National Committeewoman Christine Toretti for Ambassador to Sweden. Trump also nominated Leo Terrell for Senior Counsel to the Assistant Attorney General for Civil Rights at the US Department of Justice. Trump also nominated 2024 Nevada Senate Republican candidate Sam Brown for Under Secretary for Memorial Services at the U.S. Department of Veterans Affairs.

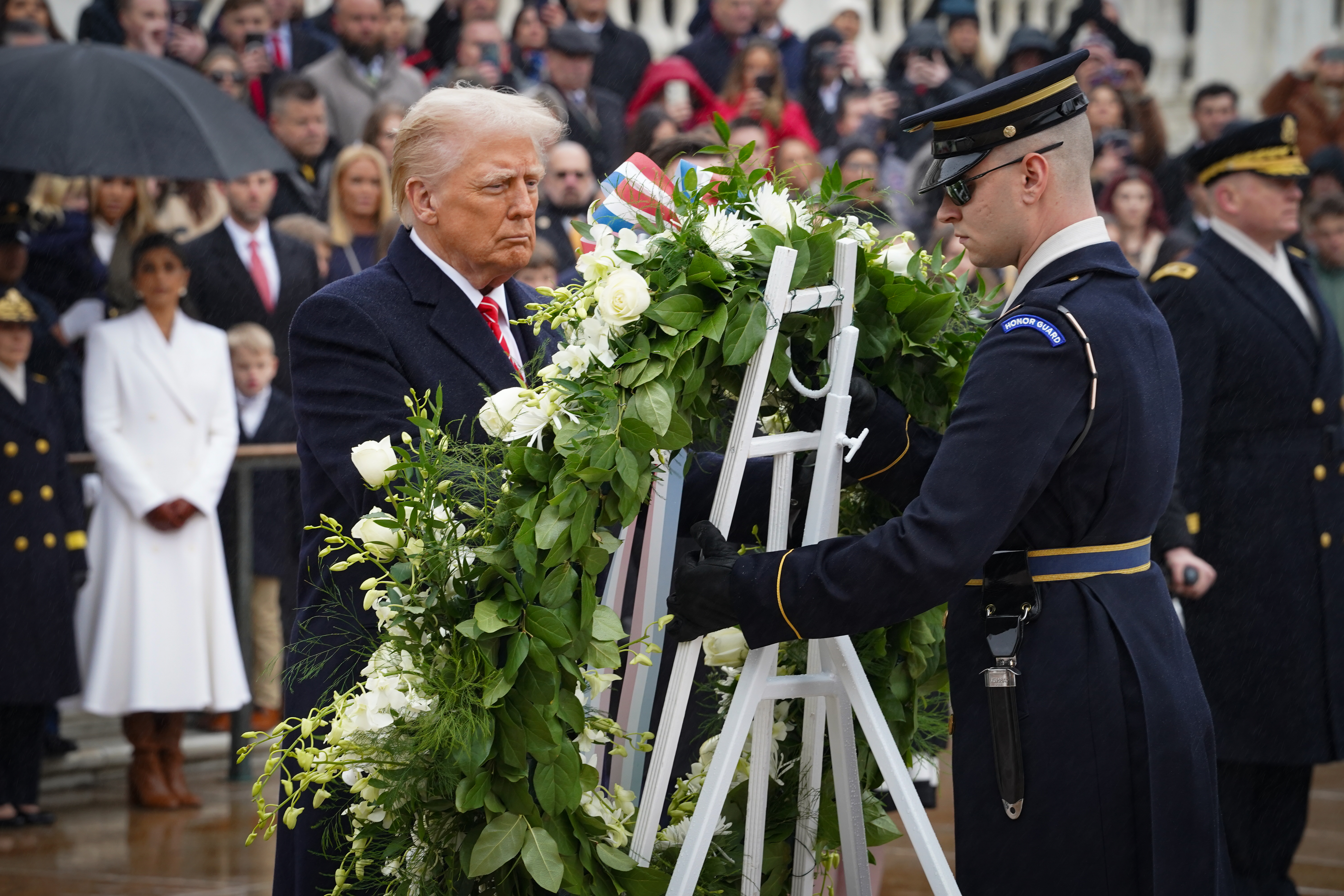
Trump places a wreath at the Tomb of Unknown Soldier at Arlington National Cemetery on January 19, 2025.

On January 10, Trump said he had picked Ed Russo to lead the Environmental Advisory Task Force. Trump also announced that Bill Briggs will be the Deputy Administrator of the Small Business Administration.

On January 11, Trump nominated former Acting Counsel for the EPA David Fotouhi for Deputy EPA Administrator, former Deputy Interior Secretary Katharine MacGregor for Deputy Interior Secretary, former Transportation General Counsel and Acting Deputy Transportation and Acting Secretary of Transportation Steven G. Bradbury for Deputy Transportation Secretary, James Danly for Deputy Energy Secretary, Casey Mulligan for Chief Counsel for Advocacy at United States Small Business Administration, and Paul R. Lawrence for Deputy Veterans Affairs Secretary.

On January 14, Trump nominated former Chair of the Equal Employment Opportunity Commission commissioner Keith Sonderling for Deputy Labor Secretary.

On January 16, Trump nominated private equity CEO Bill Pulte to lead the Federal Housing Finance Agency, former congressman Brandon Williams as the Under Secretary of Energy for Nuclear Security and the Administrator of the National Nuclear Security Administration, and Darío Gil as Under Secretary of Energy for Science and Innovation. Trump also nominated Texas Border Czar Mike Banks for Chief of the United States Border Patrol and head of his personal Secret Service detail, Sean M. Curran, for Director of the Secret Service.

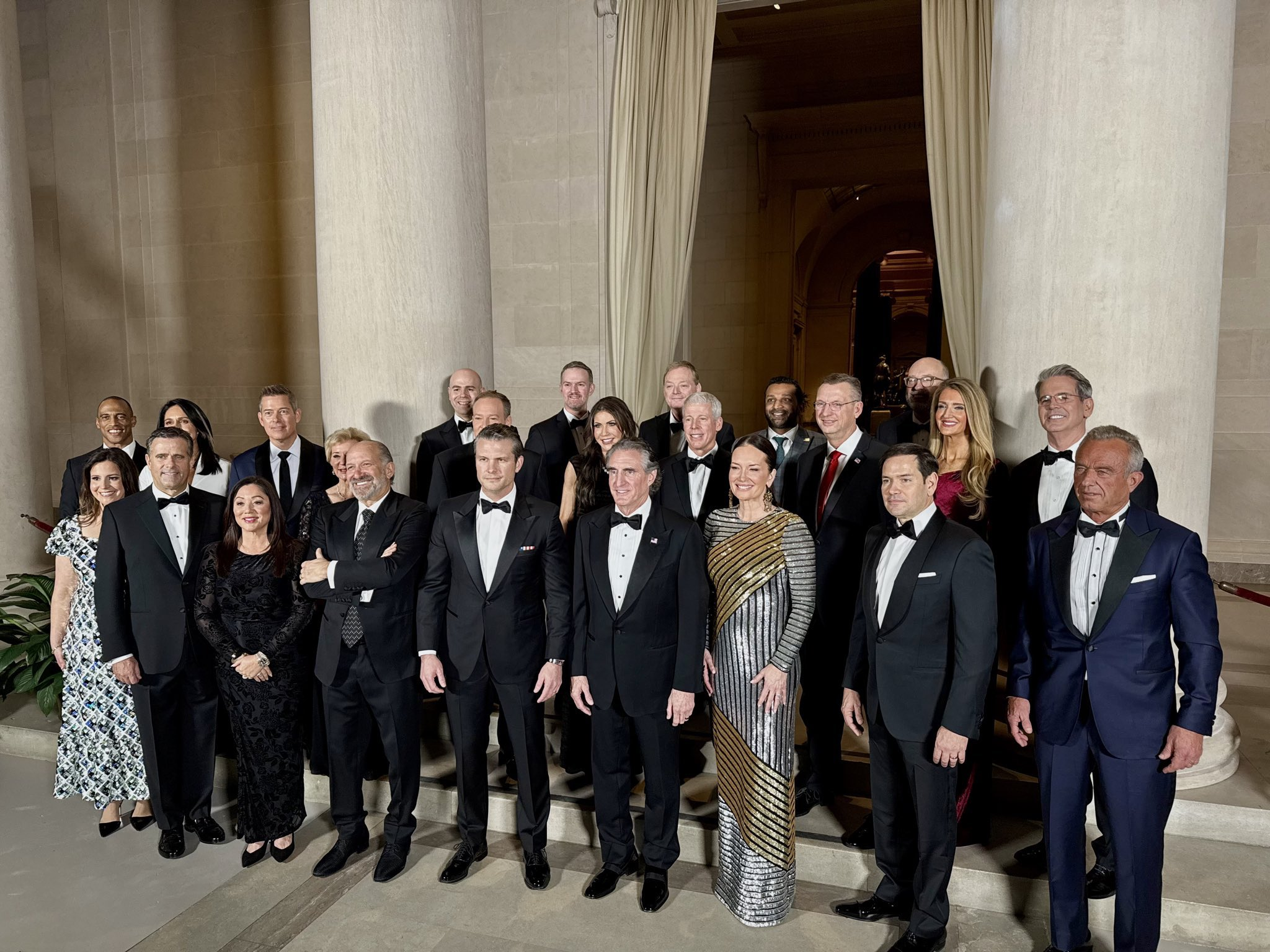
Nominees for the second cabinet of Donald Trump on January 19, 2025

On January 17, Trump announced the appointment Mel Gibson, Sylvester Stallone, and Jon Voight to be special ambassadors to Hollywood. In September of 2026, Stallone admitted that he was surprised by the announcement he was not informed about in advance, and rejected the position telling Trump that would have not have accepted if asked.

==== February ====
On February 4, Trump nominated former Under Secretary of Commerce for Oceans and Atmosphere Neil Jacobs to head the National Oceanic and Atmospheric Administration, the organization he headed on an acting basis in the first Trump administration.

On February 6, Trump nominated former police chief of Palmetto Bay, Florida Gadyaces Serralta to be Director of the United States Marshals Service.

=== Senate confirmation announcements ===
These are the people nominated for their corresponding roles.

- Secretary of State: Marco Rubio
  - Deputy Secretary of State: Christopher Landau
  - Chief of Protocol of the United States: Monica Crowley
  - Spokesperson for the United States Department of State: Tammy Bruce
  - Under Secretary of State for Economic Growth, Energy, and the Environment: Jacob Helberg
- Secretary of the Treasury: Scott Bessent
  - Deputy Secretary of the Treasury: Michael Faulkender
    - Assistant Secretary of the Treasury For Tax Policy: Ken Kies
- Secretary of Defense: Pete Hegseth
  - Deputy Secretary of Defense: Stephen Feinberg
  - Under Secretary of Defense for Policy: Elbridge Colby
  - Under Secretary of Defense for Research and Engineering: Emil Michael
  - Under Secretary of Defense for Acquisition and Sustainment: Michael Duffey
    - Assistant Secretary of Defense for Health Affairs: Keith Bass
- Attorney General: Pam Bondi
  - Deputy Attorney General: Todd Blanche
  - Solicitor General: Dean John Sauer
  - Principal Associate Deputy Attorney General: Emil Bove
  - Assistant Attorney General for Antitrust Division: Gail Slater
  - United States Attorney for the Eastern District of New York: Judge Joseph Nocella Jr.
  - United States Attorney for the Southern District of New York: Jay Clayton
- Secretary of the Interior: Doug Burgum
  - Deputy Secretary of the Interior: Katharine MacGregor
- Secretary of Agriculture: Brooke Rollins
  - Deputy Secretary of Agriculture: Stephen Vaden
- Secretary of Commerce: Howard Lutnick
- Secretary of Labor: Lori Chavez-DeRemer
  - Deputy Secretary of Labor: Keith Sonderling
- Secretary of Health and Human Services: Robert F. Kennedy Jr.
  - Deputy Secretary of Health and Human Services: Jim O'Neill
- Secretary of Housing and Urban Development: Scott Turner
- Secretary of Transportation: Sean Duffy
  - Deputy Secretary of Transportation: Steven G. Bradbury
- Secretary of Energy: Chris Wright
  - Deputy Energy Secretary: James Danly
  - Under Secretary of Energy for Nuclear Security: Brandon Williams
  - Under Secretary of Energy for Science and Innovation: Darío Gil
- Secretary of Education: Linda McMahon
- Secretary of Veterans Affairs: Doug Collins
  - Deputy Veterans Affairs Secretary: Paul R. Lawrence
  - Under Secretary of Veterans Affairs for Memorial Affairs: Sam Brown
- Secretary of Homeland Security: Kristi Noem
  - Deputy Homeland Security Secretary: Troy Edgar

==== Cabinet-level nominations requiring Senate confirmation ====
- EPA Administrator: Lee Zeldin
  - Deputy EPA Administrator: David Fotouhi
- Director of the CIA: John Ratcliffe
- Director of National Intelligence: Tulsi Gabbard
- Director of the Office of Management and Budget: Russell Vought
  - Deputy Director of the Office of Management and Budget: Dan Bishop
- Trade Representative: Jamieson Greer
- Administrator of the Small Business Administration: Kelly Loeffler
  - Deputy Administrator of the Small Business Administration: Bill Briggs

==== Non-cabinet-level offices requiring Senate confirmation ====
- Administrator of the Federal Railroad Administration: David Fink
- Administrator of the CMS: Mehmet Oz
- Administrator of NASA: Jared Isaacman
- Administrator National Oceanic and Atmospheric Administration: Neil Jacobs
- Ambassador to Argentina: Peter Lamelas
- Ambassador to Austria: Arthur Fisher
- Ambassador to the Bahamas: Herschel Walker
- Ambassador to Belgium: Bill White
- Ambassador to Canada: Pete Hoekstra
- Ambassador to Chile: Brandon Judd
- Ambassador to China: David Perdue
- Ambassador to Colombia: Dan Newlin
- Ambassador to Croatia: Nicole McGraw
- Ambassador to Denmark: Ken Howery
- Ambassador to the Dominican Republic: Leah Campos
- Ambassador to Estonia: Roman Pipko
- Ambassador to France: Charles Kushner
- Ambassador to Greece: Kimberly Guilfoyle
- Ambassador to Ireland: Edward Sharp Walsh
- Ambassador to Israel: Mike Huckabee
- Ambassador to Italy: Tilman Fertitta
- Ambassador to Japan: George Edward Glass
- Ambassador to Liechtenstein: Callista Gingrich
- Ambassador to Luxembourg: Stacey Feinberg
- Ambassador to Malta: Somers Farkas
- Ambassador to Mexico: Ronald D. Johnson
- Ambassador to Morocco: Duke Buchan
- Ambassador to NATO: Matthew Whitaker
- Ambassador to the Netherlands: Joe Popolo
- Ambassador to Panama: Kevin Marino Cabrera
- Ambassador to Portugal: John Arrigo
- Ambassador to San Marino: Tilman Fertitta
- Ambassador to Sweden: Christine Toretti
- Ambassador to Switzerland: Callista Gingrich
- Ambassador to Spain: Benjamin Leon
- Ambassador to Turkey: Tom Barrack
- Ambassador to the United Kingdom: Warren Stephens
- Ambassador to Uruguay: Lou Rinaldi
- Ambassador to the Vatican City: Brian Burch
- Chair of the Council of Economic Advisers: Stephen Miran
- Chair of the Federal Trade Commission: Andrew N. Ferguson
- Chair of the Securities and Exchange Commission: Paul S. Atkins
- Chief of the United States Border Patrol: Mike Banks
- Commissioner of FDA: Marty Makary
- Commissioner of IRS: Billy Long
- Commissioner of SSA: Frank Bisignano
- Commissioner of CBP: Rodney Scott
- Director of the CDC: Dave Weldon
- Director of the FBI: Kash Patel
- Director of the NIH: Jay Bhattacharya
- Director of ICE: Caleb Vitello
- Director of the United States Marshals Service: Gadyaces Serralta
- Secretary of the Navy: John Phelan
- Secretary of the Army: Daniel P. Driscoll
- Surgeon General: Janette Nesheiwat
- Special Presidential Envoy for Hostage Affairs: Adam Boehler

==== Non-confirmation announcements ====
The people who do not need confirmation:

- White House Chief of Staff: Susie Wiles
- Principal Deputy Chief of Staff: Dan Scavino
  - White House Deputy Chiefs of Staff:
    - James Blair for Legislative, Political and Public Affairs
    - Taylor Budowich for Communications and Personnel
    - Stephen Miller for Policy and Homeland Security Advisor
- Communications Director: Steven Cheung
- Press Secretary: Karoline Leavitt
- Staff Secretary: Will Scharf
- Director of Presidential Personnel: Sergio Gor
- White House Counsel: David Warrington
- Counselor to the President: Alina Habba
- Border Czar: Tom Homan
- National Security Advisor: Mike Waltz
  - Principal Deputy National Security Advisor: Alex Nelson Wong
- Senior Director for Counterterrorism: Sebastian Gorka
- Deputy Homeland Security Advisor: Anthony Salisbury
- Commissioner of Government Efficiency: Elon Musk
  - Counsel to Department of Government Efficiency: Bill McGinley
- FCC Chairman: Brendan Carr
- Senior Counselor for Trade and Manufacturing: Peter Navarro
- White House AI & Crypto Czar: David O. Sacks
  - Executive Director of the Crypto Advisory Council: Bo Hines
- Presidential Envoy for Special Missions: Richard Grenell
- Special Envoy for Latin America: Mauricio Claver-Carone
- Director of Office of Personnel Management: Scott Kupor
- Special Envoy to the United Kingdom: Mark Burnett
- Middle East Special Envoy: Steven Witkoff
  - Deputy Special Envoy for the Middle East: Morgan Ortagus
- Senior Advisor to the President on Arab and Middle Eastern affairs: Massad Boulos
- Ukraine and Russia Special Envoy: Keith Kellogg
- Chief of Staff to the DOJ: Chad Mizelle
- Head of DOJ's Office of General Counsel: Aaron Reitz
- Director of the Secret Service: Sean M. Curran

=== Maintaining the House majority ===
Despite the nature of the 2024 House elections that left Republicans with a narrow majority, Trump has picked several incumbent House members for his cabinet. Mike Johnson, the Republican Speaker, raised concern about too many special elections throwing the majority back into chaos. Trump has so far picked three House members, but is not expected to nominate more.

=== Withdrew from consideration ===
On November 21, Matt Gaetz withdrew his name from consideration for Attorney General. Donald Trump then chose Pam Bondi, the former Attorney General of Florida, as the nominee.

On December 3, Chad Chronister withdrew his name from consideration for Administrator of the Drug Enforcement Administration. On February 11, 2025, Trump named Terry Cole as his nominee for the position.

On March 13, the White House withdrew the nomination of Dave Weldon to head CDC due to "...Weldon's recent comments expressing skepticism about vaccines".

On March 27, the White House withdrew Elise Stefanik from consideration as Ambassador to the United Nations amid concerns that her departure from the House would affect the thin House Republican majority.

== Confirmation hearings and votes ==
On December 18, Armed Services Committee Chairman Roger Wicker announced that Defense Secretary nominee Pete Hegseth would begin confirmation hearings on January 14.

On January 7, the Senate Homeland Security Committee announced Homeland Security Secretary nominee Kristi Noem would have confirmation hearings on January 15, postponed on January 14 until January 17; and the Senate Foreign Relations Committee announced Secretary of State nominee Marco Rubio would have confirmation hearings on January 15.

On January 8, the Senate Judiciary Committee announced Attorney General nominee Pam Bondi would have confirmation hearings on January 15 and 16.

On January 9, the Senate Energy and Natural Resources Committee announced Interior Secretary nominee Doug Burgum would have confirmation hearings on January 14, postponed on January 13 until January 16, and Energy Secretary nominee Chris Wright would have confirmation hearings on January 15; the Senate Commerce, Science and Transportation Committee announced Transportation Secretary nominee Sean Duffy would have confirmation hearings on January 15; the Senate Intelligence Committee announced CIA Director nominee John Ratcliffe would have confirmation hearings on January 15; and the Senate Environment and Public Works Committee announced EPA Administrator nominee Lee Zeldin would have confirmation hearings on January 16.

On January 10, the Senate Veterans’ Affairs Committee announced Veterans Affairs Secretary nominee Doug Collins would have confirmation hearings on January 14, postponed on January 13 until January 21; and the Senate Homeland Security announced Director of Office of Management and Budget nominee Russell Vought would have confirmation hearings on January 15; and the Senate Finance Committee announced Treasury Secretary nominee Scott Bessent would have confirmation hearings on January 16.

On January 15, the Senate Banking, Housing and Urban Development Committee announced Housing and Urban Development Secretary nominee Scott Turner would have confirmation hearings on January 16; the Senate Foreign Relations Committee announced UN Ambassador nominee Elise Stefanik would have confirmation hearings on January 21. and the Senate Agriculture, Nutrition and Forestry Committee announced Agriculture Secretary nominee Brooke Rollins would have confirmation hearings on January 23.

On January 22, Senate Finance Committee announced that Health and Human Services Secretary nominee Robert F. Kennedy Jr. would begin confirmation hearings on January 29 and the Senate Committee on Health, Education, Labor and Pensions announced that he would have a hearing on January 30; the Senate Committee on Commerce, Science, and Transportation chairman Ted Cruz's office announced that Commerce Secretary nominee Howard Lutnick would begin confirmation hearings on January 29.

On January 23, Senate Judiciary Committee announced that FBI Director nominee Kash Patel would begin confirmation hearings on January 30; and the Senate Intelligence Committee announced that Director of National Intelligence nominee Tulsi Gabbard would begin confirmation hearings on January 30.

=== Confirmation votes ===
==== January ====
On January 20, the Senate Foreign Relations Committee voted unanimously to confirm Marco Rubio for Secretary of State, sending the confirmation to the full Senate, where he was confirmed unanimously as well, 99–0. Additionally, the Senate Homeland Security and Governmental Affairs Committee voted 13–2 in favor of Kristi Noem for Homeland Security Secretary; and voted 8–7 in favor of Russell Vought for Director of the Office of Management and Budget; the Senate Armed Services Committee voted 14–13 in favor of Pete Hegseth for Secretary of Defense; and the Senate Intelligence Committee voted 14–3 in favor of John Ratcliffe for CIA Director. All of these nominees, except Rubio, will now move to the full Senate to be voted on.

On January 21, the Senate Judiciary Committee announced that their committee vote on Pam Bondi's nomination for Attorney General, would be postponed to January 29; Marco Rubio was sworn in by Vice President JD Vance.

On January 22, the Senate Committee on Commerce, Science, and Transportation voted unanimously for Sean Duffy's nomination for Secretary of Transportation, moving his nomination to the full senate. Also nomination votes for Pete Hegseth, Kristi Noem, John Ratcliffe and Scott Bessent were scheduled for January 23. Hegseth and Ratcliffe first will have a procedural vote to advance their nominations, with the possibility of 30 hours of debate which would push their nomination votes to January 24.

On January 23, the Senate Committee on Environment and Public Works voted to confirm Lee Zeldin in a vote of 11–8 for EPA Administrator, the Senate Committee on Energy and Natural Resources voted to confirm Doug Burgum in a vote of 18–2 for Interior Secretary, and voted to confirm Chris Wright in a vote of 15–6 for Energy Secretary, and the Senate Committee on Banking, Housing, and Urban Affairs voted to confirm Scott Turner in a vote of 13–11 for HUD Secretary, and the Senate Committee on Veterans' Affairs voted to confirm Doug Collins in a vote of 18–1 for Veterans Affairs Secretary. These nominees' confirmations now will move to the full senate for a final vote. Later that day, the Senate confirmed John Ratcliffe in a vote of 74–25 for CIA Director and he was later sworn in by Vice President JD Vance.

On January 24, the Senate voted 50–50 for Pete Hegseth nomination for Secretary of Defense. Vice President JD Vance broke the tie, voting in favor of his nomination. He was sworn in on January 25, by Vance, at the White House.

On January 25, the Senate confirmed it had scheduled confirmation votes for Scott Bessent, nominated to be Treasury Secretary, for January 27, and Sean Duffy, nominated to be Transportation Secretary, for January 28. The Senate voted 59–34 in favor of the nomination of Kristi Noem for Homeland Security Secretary; and was sworn in later that day by Supreme Court Justice Clarence Thomas in the place of Vice President Vance who had a scheduling conflict.

On January 27, the Senate voted 68–29 for Scott Bessent's nomination for Secretary of Treasury; and was sworn in on January 28, by Supreme Court Justice Brett Kavanaugh.

On January 28, the Senate voted 77–22 for Sean Duffy's nomination for Transportation Secretary, with Georgia Senator Jon Ossoff not voting; and sworn in later that day by Supreme Court Justice Clarence Thomas. On January 29, 2025, Vice President JD Vance held a ceremonial swearing-in for Duffy.

On January 29, the Senate Judiciary Committee voted 12–10 in favor of Pam Bondi’s nomination to be Attorney General, moving it to the full senate for a vote; and the full Senate voted 56–42 for Lee Zeldin's nomination for EPA Administrator, with New Jersey Senator Cory Booker and Georgia Senator Jon Ossoff not voting; and it was announced that Doug Burgum's nomination for Interior Secretary would be brought before the full senate on January 30. Zeldin was sworn in by Supreme Court Justice Brett Kavanaugh on January 30.

On January 30, the Senate voted 80–17 for Doug Burgum's nomination for Interior Secretary, (Senators Booker, Ossoff, and Fetterman did not vote); and voted to break the filibusters for Chris Wright's and Doug Collins's nominations, scheduling their final votes for February 3.

==== February ====
On February 1, Burgum was sworn in by Supreme Court Justice Sonia Sotomayor.

On February 2, the Senate Finance Committee announced that Robert F. Kennedy Jr. would get a committee vote on his nomination for HHS Secretary on February 4.

On February 3, the Senate Intelligence Committee announced that Tulsi Gabbard would have a committee vote on her nomination for Director of National Intelligence on February 4. The full senate also voted 59–38 in favor of Chris Wright's nomination for Energy Secretary. The Senate Agriculture Committee voted unanimously in favor of Brooke Rollins for Agriculture Secretary, now her nomination will now move to the full senate for a final vote.

On February 4, the Senate Intelligence Committee voted 9–8 in favor of Tulsi Gabbard's nomination to be Director of National Intelligence; the Senate Finance Committee voted 14–13 in favor of Robert F. Kennedy Jr.'s nomination to be HHS Secretary; the Senate voted 77–23 in favor of Doug Collins to be Veterans Affairs Secretary; and voted 54–46 for Pam Bondi to be Attorney General.

On February 5, the Senate Committee on Commerce, Science, and Transportation voted 16–12 in favor of Howard Lutnick's nomination to be Commerce Secretary, moving his nomination to the full senate for a vote. The full senate voted 55–44 to confirm Scott Turner for HUD Secretary. Also, Pam Bondi was sworn in as Attorney General; Doug Collins as Veterans Affairs Secretary; and Scott Turner as HUD Secretary, all by Supreme Court Justice Clarence Thomas.

On February 6, the Senate Judiciary Committee was scheduled to vote on the nomination of Kash Patel to be FBI Director; but then postponed until February 13. The senate voted 53–47 in favor of Russell Vought's nomination to be the Director of the Office of Management and Budget.

On February 12, the Senate voted 52–48 in favor of Tulsi Gabbard to be the Director of National Intelligence and she was sworn in later that day by Attorney General Pam Bondi. The Senate announced that Robert F. Kennedy Jr.'s nomination for HHS Secretary would be voted on February 13, followed by Brooke Rollins for Agriculture Secretary, followed by votes to break filibusters on Howard Lutnick's nomination to be Commerce Secretary and Kelly Loeffler's nomination to be the Administrator of the Small Business Administration.

On February 13, the Senate voted 52–48 in favor of Robert F. Kennedy Jr.'s nomination for HHS Secretary and he was sworn in later that day by Supreme Court Justice Neil Gorsuch. Later, Brooke Rollins for Agriculture Secretary was confirmed with a vote of 72–28 and was sworn in by Supreme Court Justice Clarence Thomas. The Senate Judiciary Committee voted 12–10 in favor of the nomination of Kash Patel to be FBI Director moving his nomination to the full senate for a final vote.

On February 18, the Senate voted 51–45 in favor of Howard Lutnick's nomination for Commerce Secretary.

On February 19, the Senate voted 52–46 in favor of Kelly Loeffler's nomination for Administrator of the Small Business Administration.

On February 20, the Senate Health, Education, Labor and Pensions Committee voted 12–11 in favor of Linda McMahon's nomination to be Secretary of Education; and the full senate voted 51–49 to confirm Kash Patel's nomination to be FBI Director.

On February 26, the Senate voted 56–43 in favor of Jamieson Greer's nomination for United States Trade Representative.

On February 27, the Senate Health, Education, Labor and Pensions Committee voted 13–9 in favor of Lori Chavez-DeRemer's nomination to be Secretary of Labor.

==== March ====
On March 3, the Senate voted 51–45 in favor of Linda McMahon's nomination for Education Secretary.

On March 10, the Senate voted 67–32 in favor of Lori Chavez-DeRemer's nomination for Labor Secretary.

== See also ==
- Agenda 47
- America First Policy Institute
- Hiring and personnel concerns about Donald Trump
- First presidential transition of Donald Trump
- United States presidential transition
- First cabinet of Donald Trump
- Second cabinet of Donald Trump
