= Steven E. Koonin =

American physicist (born 1951)

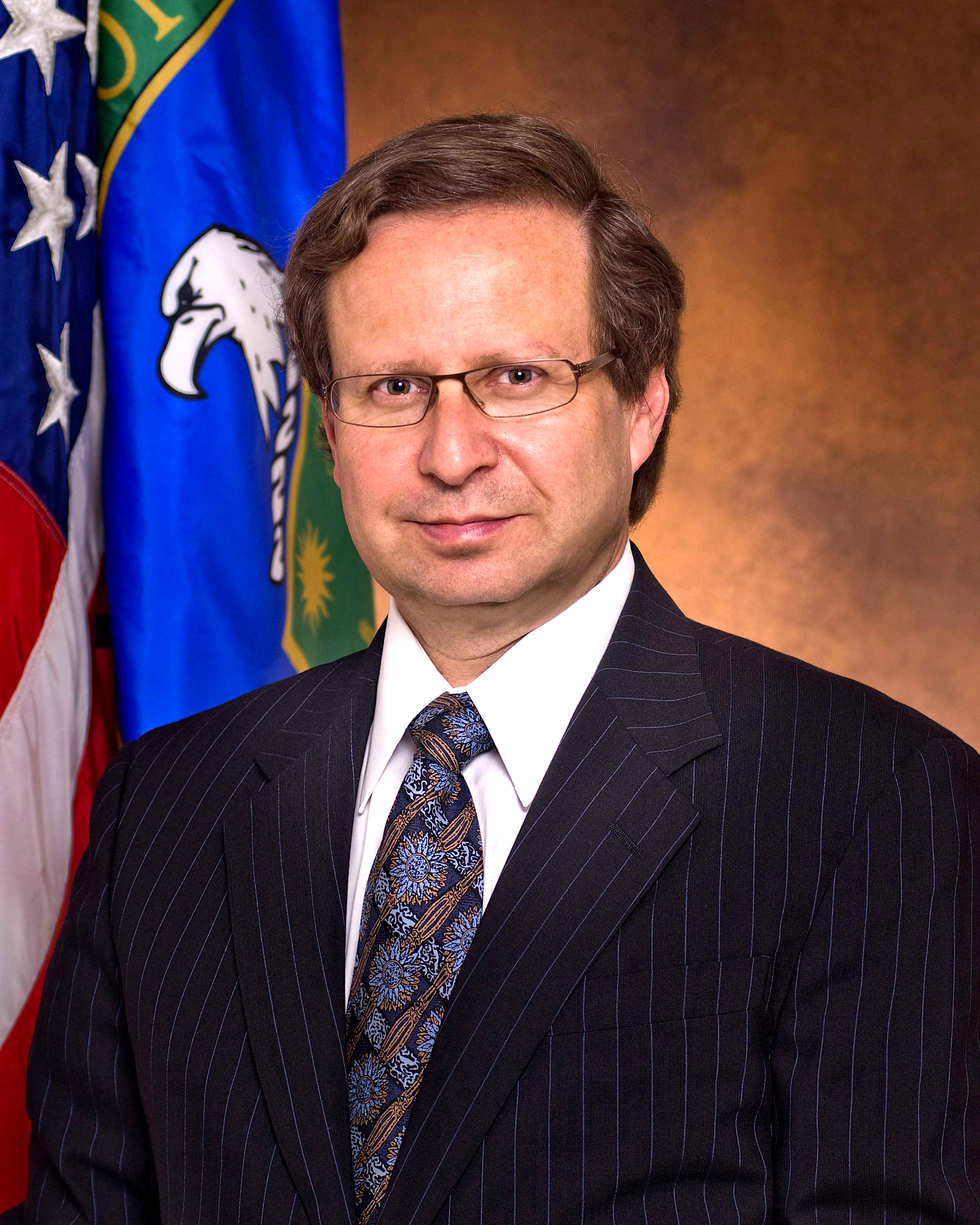
- Koonin in 2009

Director of the Center for Urban Science and Progress, New York University
- In office April 2012 – ?

2nd Under Secretary for Science
- In office May 2009 – November 2011
- President: Barack Obama
- Preceded by: Raymond L. Orbach

7th Provost of Caltech
- In office February 1995 – March 2004
- Preceded by: Paul C. Jennings
- Succeeded by: Edward Stolper (acting)

Personal details
- Born: December 12, 1951 (age 74) Brooklyn, New York
- Spouse: Laurie Koonin
- Children: 3
- Education: B.S., California Institute of Technology; Ph.D., Massachusetts Institute of Technology
- Scientific career
- Fields: theoretical physics, alternative energy sources, climate science
- Workplaces: Caltech; BP; NYU
- Thesis: Hydrodynamic approximations to time-dependent Hartree-Fock (1975)
- Doctoral advisor: Arthur Kerman
- Notable students: Post-docs: Chris Adami; Wolfgang Fink; Ming-Chung Chu

Steven Elliot Koonin (born December 12, 1951) is an American theoretical physicist, environmental scientist, and former director of the Center for Urban Science and Progress at New York University. He is also a professor in the Department of Civil and Urban Engineering at NYU's Tandon School of Engineering. From 2004 to 2009, Koonin was employed by BP as the oil and gas company’s Chief Scientist. From 2009 to 2011, he was Under Secretary for Science, Department of Energy, in the Obama administration. He later published Unsettled: What Climate Science Tells Us, What It Doesn't, and Why It Matters, for which he was widely condemned for promoting climate denial and labeled a climate change skeptic. In 2024, he became the Edward Teller Fellow at Stanford University's Hoover Institution. In 2025, he was member of the United States Department of Energy's Climate Working Group -formed by five researchers who reject the scientific consensus on climate change- and coauthor the U.S. Department of Energy draft report, A Critical Review of Impacts of Greenhouse Gas Emissions on the U.S. Climate that asserted that the danger from greenhouse gas emissions was exaggerated.

== Biography ==
Born in Brooklyn, New York City, Koonin graduated from Stuyvesant High School at the age of 16, received his Bachelor of Science from the California Institute of Technology and his Ph.D. from the Massachusetts Institute of Technology under the supervision of Arthur Kerman in the MIT Center for Theoretical Physics. In 1975, Koonin joined the faculty of the California Institute of Technology as an assistant professor of theoretical physics becoming one of their youngest ever faculty, and served as the institute's provost from 1995 to 2004. During his tenure as provost, he was involved in projects related to scientific computing, bioengineering, and biology. He oversaw institutional support for large-scale research projects, including the development of the Thirty-Meter Telescope project.

In 2004, Koonin joined BP as their chief scientist, where he was responsible for guiding the company's long-range technology strategy, particularly in alternative and renewable energy sources. He was tapped for the position of Under Secretary for Science at the United States Department of Energy by Steven Chu, Obama's Secretary of Energy, and served from May 19, 2009, to November 18, 2011. At the Department of Energy, Koonin was involved in the climate research program and energy technology policy. He was the lead author of the agency's 2011 Strategic Plan and the first Quadrennial Technology review. Koonin left in November 2011 for a position at the Institute for Defense Analyses. In 2012, he was appointed the founding director of NYU's Center for Urban Science and Progress (CUSP), an applied research center which uses data to study urban challenges.

At NYU, Koonin was appointed to the Stern School of Business, the Tandon School of Engineering, and the Department of Physics. He has served on numerous advisory bodies for the National Science Foundation, the Department of Defense, and the Department of Energy and its various national laboratories, such as the JASON defense advisory group, which he has chaired. From 2014 to 2019, he chaired the National Academies' Diversional Committee for Engineering and Physical Sciences. From 2014 to 2024, he was a trustee of the Institute for Defense Analyses. Koonin's research interests have included theoretical nuclear, many-body, and computational physics, nuclear astrophysics, and global environmental science. He is a fellow of the American Academy of Arts and Sciences and a member of the National Academy of Sciences.

He was awarded the prestigious Barry Prize for Distinguished Intellectual Achievement by the American Academy of Sciences and Letters in 2023.

== Cold fusion ==
Koonin played a major role in the 1989 national controversy around cold fusion sparked by the research of Martin Fleischmann and Stanley Pons. After the explosive announcement of their research at the University of Utah, excitement for the potential of fusion as an energy source quickly gave way to skepticism among the scientific community as scientists across the world raced to replicate the Utah experiment. Steven Koonin and his Caltech colleagues, Nathan Lewis and Charles Barnes (who became known as the "Caltech Three") headed up a research group to investigate cold fusion.

The scientific skepticism around cold fusion came to a head at the meeting of the American Physical Society in Baltimore later in 1989. At the conference, Steven Koonin, and Nathan Lewis gave devastating presentations based on the work of the Caltech cold fusion research group. During his presentation, Koonin called the Utah publication of the Utah research a result of "the incompetence and delusion of Pons and Fleischmann," which was met with a standing ovation. Initially Koonin had intended to go further, potentially calling the Pons-Fleischmann research fraudulent, however he was counseled to avoid using the term "fraud" by peers and by Caltech president, Thomas E. Everhart. These presentations of the Caltech group revealed serious deficiencies in cold fusion research and ultimately led to mainstream science's rejection of cold fusion.

== Views on climate change ==
Koonin became publicly involved in the policy debate about climate change starting with a Wall Street Journal opinion piece in 2017, in which he floated the idea of a red team/blue team exercise for climate science. In 2018, the Environmental Protection Agency (EPA) under the leadership of Scott Pruitt proposed a public debate on climate change to refute the 2017 Climate Science Special Report. According to a draft press release edited by Koonin and William Happer, Princeton physics professor and director of the CO_{2} Coalition, they planned "red team"/blue team exercises to challenge the scientific consensus on climate. The draft was never released, and the plans were not carried out.

In 2019, the Trump Administration proposed to create a "Presidential Committee on Climate Security" at the National Security Council that would conduct an "adversarial" review of the scientific consensus on climate change. Koonin was actively involved in recruiting others to be part of this review. The committee was scrapped in favor of an initiative not "subject to the same level of public disclosure as a formal advisory committee".

Koonin is a coauthor of the July 23, 2025, U.S. Department of Energy report, A Critical Review of Impacts of Greenhouse Gas Emissions on the U.S. Climate that asserted that the danger from greenhouse gas emissions was exaggerated. In an interview with The Free Press, Koonin claimed that "Ninety-five percent of the report is sourced from" the United Nations Intergovernmental Panel on Climate Change (IPCC) report. The report has been criticized for cherry-picking and for highlighting uncertainties in order to downplay the impacts of climate change. Furthermore, numerous scientists whose work was cited by the report indicated that their work had been mischaracterized.

=== 2014 Wall Street Journal commentary ===
Koonin wrote a 2000-word essay, "Climate Science Is Not Settled," that was published in an issue of The Wall Street Journal. The main points of the article were that:

- the limits of climate measurement data make it hard to untangle the planet's response to human influences, from natural changes that are poorly understood.
- The results of various climate models disagree with or contradict each other.
- Press releases, summaries, headlines, and news stories often don't accurately reflect the consensus among scientists.
- The science is not mature enough to make useful projections about the future of the climate, nor what effects past or future human actions might have on it.

In an article in Slate, climate physicist Raymond Pierrehumbert criticized Koonin's essay as "a litany of discredited arguments" with "nuggets of truth ... buried beneath a rubble of false or misleading claims from the standard climate skeptics' canon."

=== 2021 book Unsettled ===
In 2021, Koonin published the book Unsettled: What Climate Science Tells Us, What It Doesn't, and Why It Matters. Critics accused him of cherry picking data, muddying the waters surrounding the science of climate change, and having no experience in climate science, all points he rebukes in the opening of his book.

In a review in Scientific American, economist Gary Yohe wrote that Koonin "falsely suggest[s] that we don't understand the risks well enough to take action":

The science is stronger than ever around findings that speak to the likelihood and consequences of climate impacts, and has been growing stronger for decades. In the early days of research, the uncertainty was wide; but with each subsequent step that uncertainty has narrowed or become better understood. This is how science works, and in the case of climate, the early indications detected and attributed in the 1980s and 1990s, have come true, over and over again and sooner than anticipated... [Decision makers] are using the best and most honest science to inform prospective investments in abatement (reducing greenhouse gas emissions to diminish the estimated likelihoods of dangerous climate change impacts) and adaptation (reducing vulnerabilities to diminish their current and projected consequences).

Physicist Mark Boslough, a former student of Koonin, posted a critical review at Yale Climate Connections. He stated that "Koonin makes use of an old strawman concocted by opponents of climate science in the 1990s to create an illusion of arrogant scientists, biased media, and lying politicians – making them easier to attack."

Nonprofit organization Inside Climate News reported that climate scientists call Koonin's conclusions "fatally out of date ... and based on the 2013 physical science report of the Intergovernmental Panel on Climate Change (IPCC)."

Mark P. Mills, a senior fellow at the Manhattan Institute, a conservative think tank, and faculty fellow at Northwestern University’s McCormick School of Engineering and Applied Science, lauded the book in The Wall Street Journal as "rebut[ing] much of the dominant political narrative". Twelve scientists analyzed Mills's arguments and said that he merely repeated Koonin's incorrect and misleading claims. Koonin responded with a post on Medium answering these critics.

On August 21, 2023, an interview with Koonin was released via the Stanford University Hoover Institution video series, Uncommon Knowledge with Peter Robinson.

== Publications ==
- Computational Physics: Fortran Version. Baton Rouge: CRC Press. 2018. ISBN 9780429973659.
- Unsettled: What Climate Science Tells Us, What It Doesn't, and Why It Matters. Dallas: BenBella Books. 2021. ISBN 9781953295248.
- 2024 edition: Unsettled: What Climate Science Tells Us, What It Doesn't, and Why It Matters (Updated and Expanded ed.). Dallas: BenBella Books. 2024. ISBN 9781637745250.
- In 2025, with John Christy, Judith Curry, Ross McKitrick, and Roy Spencer, Koonin was a member of the United States Department of Energy's Climate Working Group and a co-author of its A Critical Review of Impacts of Greenhouse Gas Emissions on the US Climate (23 July 2025)
