= Christy Landes =

American physical chemist

Christy F. Landes
- Education: George Mason University; Georgia Tech
- Scientific career
- Workplaces: University of Oregon; University of Texas at Austin; University of Houston; Rice University; University of Illinois Urbana-Champaign
- Thesis: The dependence of the opto-electronic properties of CdSe nanoparticles on surface properties (2003)

Christy F. Landes is an American physical chemist who is the Jerry A. Walker Endowed Chair in chemistry at the University of Illinois Urbana-Champaign. She previously was the Kenneth S. Pitzer-Schlumberger Chair at Rice University. She seeks to understand the structure-function relationships in biological processes and materials. She was appointed a National Academy of Sciences Kavli Fellow in 2019.

== Early life and education ==
Landes was an undergraduate student in chemistry at George Mason University. She moved to Georgia Tech for her doctoral research, where she majored in physical chemistry under the supervision of Mostafa El-Sayed. After earning her doctorate, Landes joined the University of Oregon as a postdoctoral researcher with Geraldine L. Richmond, where she spent one year before joining the University of Texas at Austin with Paul Barbara.

== Research and career ==
Landes joined the University of Houston at an assistant professor in 2006, and moved to Rice University in 2009. She was appointed Kenneth S. Pitzer-Schlumberger Chair in 2021. Her early independent work considered super-resolution single molecule spectroscopy for the characterization of biomolecules using FRET with membrane receptors and diffusion within polymer brushes and porous hydrogel materials. She has pioneered the application of super-resolution microscopy to understand chromatography and has focused on tuning the plasmonic properties of nanomaterials using electrochemistry and stimuli-responsive polymers. She has also shown how silver ions disperse from the tips of gold-silver nanoparticle alloys, which may improve catalytic activity. Her biophysical chemistry work has demonstrated that single-molecule approaches could be used to better understand cancer metastasis.

Landes established the NSF Center for Adapting Flaws into Features (CAFF) in 2021 and serves as its director. The center investigates the defects in silicon-based electronics that hold promise for improving device performance, explore the structural and optoelectronic processes that make these flaws influential, and realize technologies that incorporate and exploit these flaws.

Landes was elected Chair of the Physical Chemistry Division in 2020.

Landes joined the University of Illinois Urbana-Champaign in 2023.

== Awards and honors ==
- 2011 National Science Foundation CAREER Award
- 2016 American Chemical Society Early-Career Award in Experimental Physical Chemistry
- 2019 Rice Institute of Biosciences and Bioengineering Hamill Innovation Award
- 2019 National Academy of Sciences Kavli Fellow
- 2020 National Science Foundation Award for Special Creativity

== Selected publications ==
- Hao Shen; Lawrence J Tauzin; Rashad Baiyasi; Wenxiao Wang; Moringo, Nicholas; Bo Shuang; Landes, Christy (2017). "Single Particle Tracking: From Theory to Biophysical Applications". Chemical Reviews. 117 (11): 7331–7376. doi:10.1021/acs.chemrev.6b00815. PMID 28520419. Wikidata Q38682378.
- Lydia Kisley; Jixin Chen; Andrea P. Mansur; et al. (2014). "Unified superresolution experiments and stochastic theory provide mechanistic insight into protein ion-exchange adsorptive separations" (PDF). Proceedings of the National Academy of Sciences of the United States of America. 111 (6): 2075–2080. Bibcode:2014PNAS..111.2075K. doi:10.1073/pnas.1318405111. PMC 3926075. PMID 24459184. Wikidata Q30572024.
- Carmen Reznik; Qusai Darugar; Andrea Wheat; Tim Fulghum; Rigoberto C Advincula; Christy F Landes (2008). "Single ion diffusive transport within a Poly(styrene sulfonate) polymer brush matrix probed by fluorescence correlation spectroscopy". The Journal of Physical Chemistry B. 112 (35): 10890–10897. doi:10.1021/jp803718p. PMID 18630854. Wikidata Q81649435.
- Sergio Dominguez-Medina; Steven McDonough; Pattanawit Swanglap; Landes, Christy; Link, Stephan (2012). "In situ measurement of bovine serum albumin interaction with gold nanospheres". Langmuir. 28 (24): 9131–9139. doi:10.1021/la3005213. PMC 3378771. PMID 22515552. Wikidata Q36044253.
