= Raymond L. Orbach =

American physicist and political administrator (born 1934)

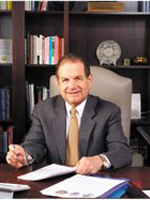
- Official portrait of Raymond Orbach

1st Under Secretary of Energy for Science
- In office June 1, 2006 – May 2009
- President: George W. Bush
- Succeeded by: Steven E. Koonin

Director of the Office of Science, Department of Energy
- In office March 4, 2002 – May 31, 2006

6th Chancellor of University of California, Riverside
- In office 1992–2002
- Preceded by: Rosemary S. J. Schraer
- Succeeded by: France A. Córdova

Personal details
- Born: Los Angeles, California, United States
- Party: Republican
- Spouse: Eva Orbach
- Education: B.S., California Institute of Technology; Ph.D., University of California, Berkeley
- Scientific career
- Fields: Physics
- Workplaces: Harvard University; University of California, Los Angeles
- Thesis: Some problems in spin wave theory in ferromagnets and antiferromagnets and in the generation and attenuation of microwave frequency phonons at low temperatures (1960)
- Doctoral advisor: Charles Kittel

Raymond Lee Orbach (born 1934) is an American physicist and administrator. He served as Under Secretary for Science in the United States Department of Energy from 2006 until 2009, when he was replaced by Steven E. Koonin. Until his resignation in December 2012, Orbach was director of the Energy Institute at the University of Texas at Austin. Orbach continues to do research as a tenured professor in the Cockrell Family Dean's Chair for Engineering Excellence at the University of Texas.

Orbach received a Bachelor of Science degree in physics from the California Institute of Technology in 1956 and a Ph.D. degree in physics from the University of California, Berkeley, in 1960. Orbach began his academic career as a postdoctoral fellow at Oxford University in 1960. In 1961, while at Oxford he published a paper in the Proceedings of the Royal Society of London Series A. The paper is titled "Spin-Lattice Relaxation in Rare-Earth Salts" and describes what is now known as the Orbach Process, crucial to understanding the magnetic properties of materials. He subsequently became an assistant professor of applied physics at Harvard University later in 1961. He joined the faculty of the University of California, Los Angeles (UCLA) two years later as an associate professor, and became a full professor in 1966.

Orbach's research in theoretical and experimental physics has resulted in the publication of more than 240 scientific articles, and he is a fellow of the American Physical Society and the American Association for the Advancement of Science.

From 1982 to 1992, he served as the provost of the College of Letters and Science at UCLA, and from 1992 to 2002 as chancellor of the University of California, Riverside.

From March 14, 2002 until mid-2009, Orbach was director of the Office of Science at the Department of Energy, making him the highest-ranking science policy administrator within the DOE. After June 1, 2006, he was the first Under Secretary for Science, for which President George W. Bush nominated him after the position was created by the Energy Policy Act of 2005.

On August 1, 2009 he became the founding director of the Energy Institute at the University of Texas at Austin. He resigned November 30, 2012 in response to a report critical of the Energy Institute's handling of potential conflicts of interest involving the geologist Charles G. Groat.

On November 3, 2009, the Science Library at the University of California, Riverside was renamed Orbach Library in honor of Orbach.

Orbach was born in Los Angeles, California.
