= Geraldine L. Richmond =

American scientist (born 1953)

Geraldine Richmond
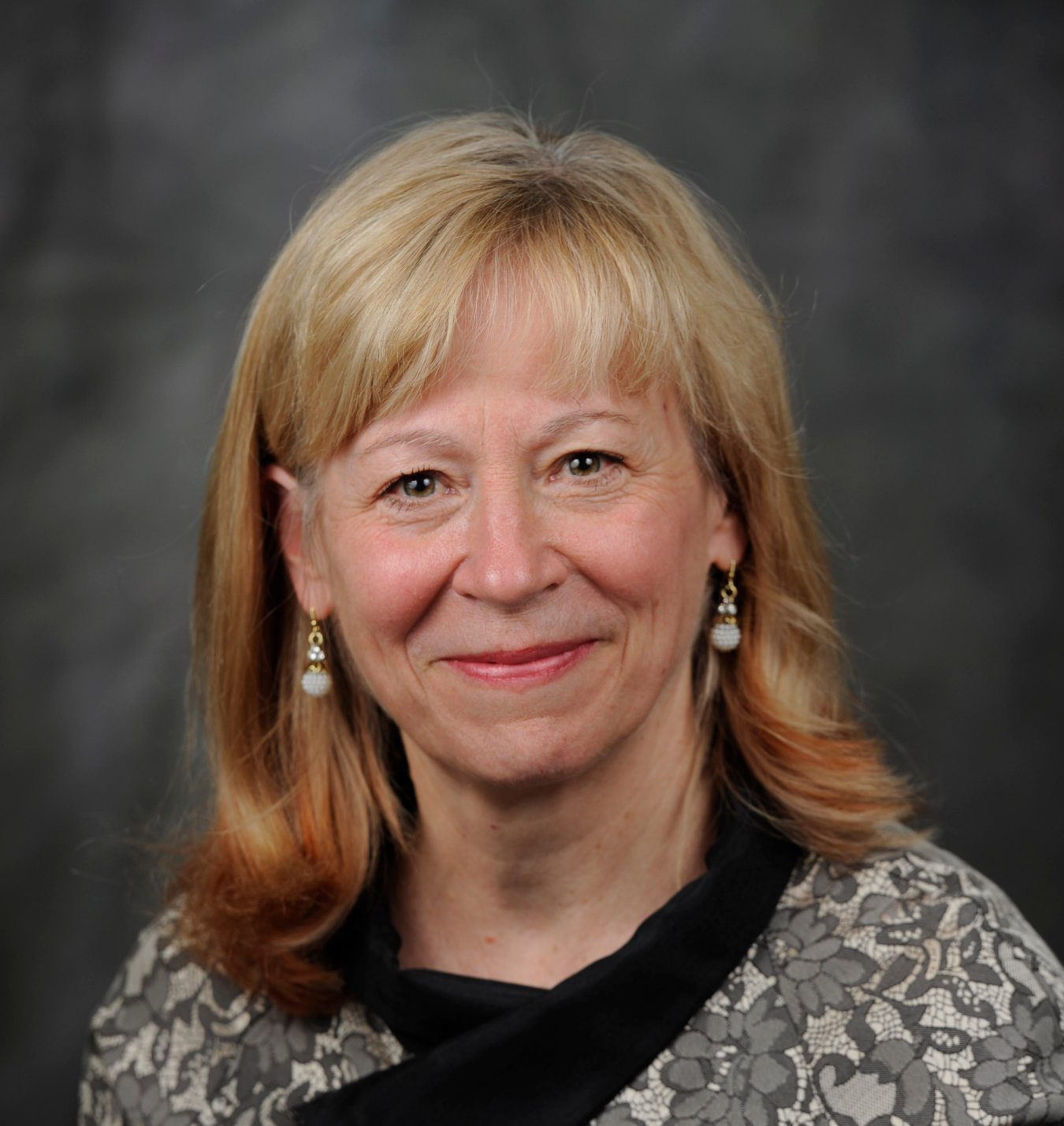
- Geri Richmond

Interim Vice President for Research and Innovation at the University of Oregon
- Incumbent
- Assumed office November 10, 2025
- Preceded by: Anshuman Razdan

Under Secretary of Energy for Science
- In office November 15, 2021 – January 20, 2025
- President: Joe Biden
- Preceded by: Paul Dabbar
- Succeeded by: Darío Gil

Personal details
- Born: January 17, 1953 (age 73) Salina, Kansas, US
- Spouse: Stephen Kevan
- Children: 2
- Education: Kansas State University (BS); University of California, Berkeley (PhD)
- Known for: Chemistry and physics of complex surfaces and interfaces relevant to energy production, atmospheric chemistry, environmental remediation; Advocacy and mentorship for women in science
- Awards: National Medal of Science; Davisson-Germer Prize; Garvan-Olin Medal
- Scientific career
- Fields: Physical Chemistry
- Institutions: Bryn Mawr College; University of Oregon
- Thesis: Time evolution of the gain in the ClF/H₂ rotational chemical laser: Evidence for V->R energy transfer (1980)
- Doctoral advisor: George C. Pimentel
- Notable students: Post-docs: Heather C. Allen; Christy Landes

Geraldine Lee Richmond (born January 17, 1953, in Salina, Kansas) is an American chemist and physical chemist who is the Interim Vice President for Research and Innovation (VPRI) at the University of Oregon. She directs and oversees the university's entire research enterprise. She is committed to enhancing research excellence and strengthening the role or research, scholarship, and creative activity across the university. Before her appointment as VPRI, she served as the Under Secretary of Energy for Science in the US Department of Energy from 2021 to 2025. Richmond was unanimously confirmed by the United States Senate to her role on November 5, 2021. In this position, she oversees the Office of Science, the Applied Energy offices, and 13 of the 17 Department of Energy national laboratories. Before this appointment, Richmond served as a Professor of Physical Chemistry and held the Presidential Chair in Science at the University of Oregon. Her research has focused on understanding the chemistry and physics of complex surfaces and interfaces, using laser-based experimental and theoretical computational methods. These understandings are most relevant to energy production, atmospheric chemistry and remediation of the environment. Throughout her career she has also worked to increase the number and success of women scientists in the U.S. and in many developing countries through the COACh program that she founded in 1999. She is a member of the National Academy of Sciences and the American Academy of Arts and Sciences. In recognition of her scientific achievements and contributions to women in science, she received the National Medal of Science from President Obama in 2013.

== Education ==
Richmond received her B.S. in chemistry in 1975 from Kansas State University and her Ph.D. in 1980 at University of California, Berkeley, in physical chemistry under the direction of George C. Pimentel.

== Career ==
From 1980 to 1985 she was an assistant professor of chemistry at Bryn Mawr College. Since 1985, Richmond has been at UO, from 1985 to 1991 as an associate professor of chemistry, and as a professor since 1991. Until 1995 she was director of the Chemical Physics Institute. During her time there, she has held the Knight Professor of Liberal Arts and Sciences position (1998-2001), the Richard M. and Patricia H. Noyes Professor position (2001-2013), and currently holds the Presidential Chair in Science. Her teaching has primarily focused on introductory chemistry and courses designed for non-science majors. Richmond’s scientific research explores the chemical and physical processes occurring at complex buried interfaces. Her work extensively uses laser-based spectroscopy experiments combined with theoretical computational methods. She has investigated the hydrogen bonding of surface water molecules at metal/water, air/water, and oil/water interfaces, as well as the adsorption of surfactants, salts, acids, polymers, and other solutes at these interfaces.

A significant focus of her studies at air-water interfaces has been on the adsorption and reactivity of atmospherically important species, including carbon dioxide, sulfur-containing compounds, and small organic molecules relevant to climate change and air pollution. More recently, her research has expanded to understanding the molecular factors that contribute to the surface stabilization of nanoemulsions. This work is particularly relevant to applications such as environmental remediation and drug delivery.

Richmond is the founding director of COACh, a grassroots organization based out of the University of Oregon that conducts research on challenges that women and minority groups face in achieving their STEM career aspirations. It also provides career building workshops aimed at increasing the number and success of women scientists in the U.S. and in many developing countries around the globe. Over 25,000 women scientists have been benefitted from the COACh programs that continue today.

== Service ==
Richmond was appointed by Governor Kitzhaber to the Oregon State Board of Higher Education from 1999 to 2003 and reappointed by Governor Kulongoski from 2004 to 2006. From 1998 to 2003 she served as chair of the Department of Energy Basic Energy Sciences Advisory Committee (BESAC). In 2014, Richmond was elected president of the American Association for the Advancement of Science for a term beginning in February 2015. In 2014, she was appointed by Secretary John Kerry to serve as the Science Envoy for the Lower Mekong River Countries. She was appointed by President Obama to the National Science Board for a term of 2012–2016 and reappointed by President Trump from 2016 to 2022. Since 2016 she has served as Secretary of the American Academy of Arts and Sciences and is the 2019–2020 President of Sigma Xi, The Scientific Research Honor Society.

Richmond is director of the NSF-funded Research Experience for Undergraduates (REU) program at the University of Oregon. Started in 1987 it is one of the longest-running REU programs in the United States. In the over 30 years of the REU program, it has hosted over 400 undergraduates from across the country with 90% continuing to graduate school.

== Honors ==
- 1989 Coblentz Society Spectroscopy Award
- 1993 Fellow, American Physical Society, "For seminal contributions to the understanding of dynamics at interfaces accomplished by innovative applications of nonlinear optical phenomena."
- 1996 Francis P. Garvan-Olin Medal of the American Chemical Society
- 1997 Presidential Award for Excellence in Science and Engineering Mentoring
- 2001 Oregon Outstanding Scientist Award, Oregon Academy of Science
- 2003 Fellow, American Association for the Advancement of Science
- 2004 Spiers Medal of the UK Royal Society of Chemistry
- 2006 Council on Chemical Research Diversity Award
- 2006 Fellow, American Academy of Arts and Sciences
- 2008 Bomem-Michaelson Award
- 2008 Fellow, Association for Women in Science
- 2011 Fellow, American Chemical Society
- 2011 Joel Henry Hildebrand Award of the American Chemical Society, "For pioneering applications of nonlinear optical spectroscopies and modeling of liquid surfaces and the resulting new understanding of water structure and bonding at liquid interfaces."
- 2011 Member, National Academy of Sciences
- 2013 Charles Lathrop Parsons Award of the American Chemical Society, "For distinguished public service to chemistry through advocacy for higher education, wise counsel and leadership in national science policy, and tireless advocacy for women chemists."
- 2013 Davisson-Germer Prize for "elegant elucidation of the molecular structure and organization of liquid-liquid and liquid-air interfaces using nonlinear optical spectroscopies"
- 2013 National Medal of Science for “her landmark discoveries of the molecular characteristics of water; for her creative demonstration of how her findings impact many key biological, chemical and technological processes; and for her extraordinary efforts in the United States and around the globe to promote women in science"
- 2014 Pittsburgh Spectroscopy Award of the Spectroscopy Society of Pittsburgh
- 2017 Honorary Doctorate Degree, Illinois Institute of Technology
- 2017 Honorary Doctorate Degree, Kansas State University
- 2018 Linus Pauling Award, Northwest Region American Chemical Society
- 2018 Priestley Medal of the American Chemical Society
- 2019 Linus Pauling Legacy Award, Oregon State University
- 2020 Oregon History Maker, Oregon Historical Society
- 2020 Dickson Prize, Carnegie Mellon University
- 2021 Oregon History Maker, Oregon Historical Society
- 2023 Othmer Gold Medal, Science History Institute
- 2025 Gold Medal Award from the Society for Applied Spectroscopy
