= Under Secretary of Energy for Science and Innovation =

- S4
- Seal of the U. S. Department of Energy

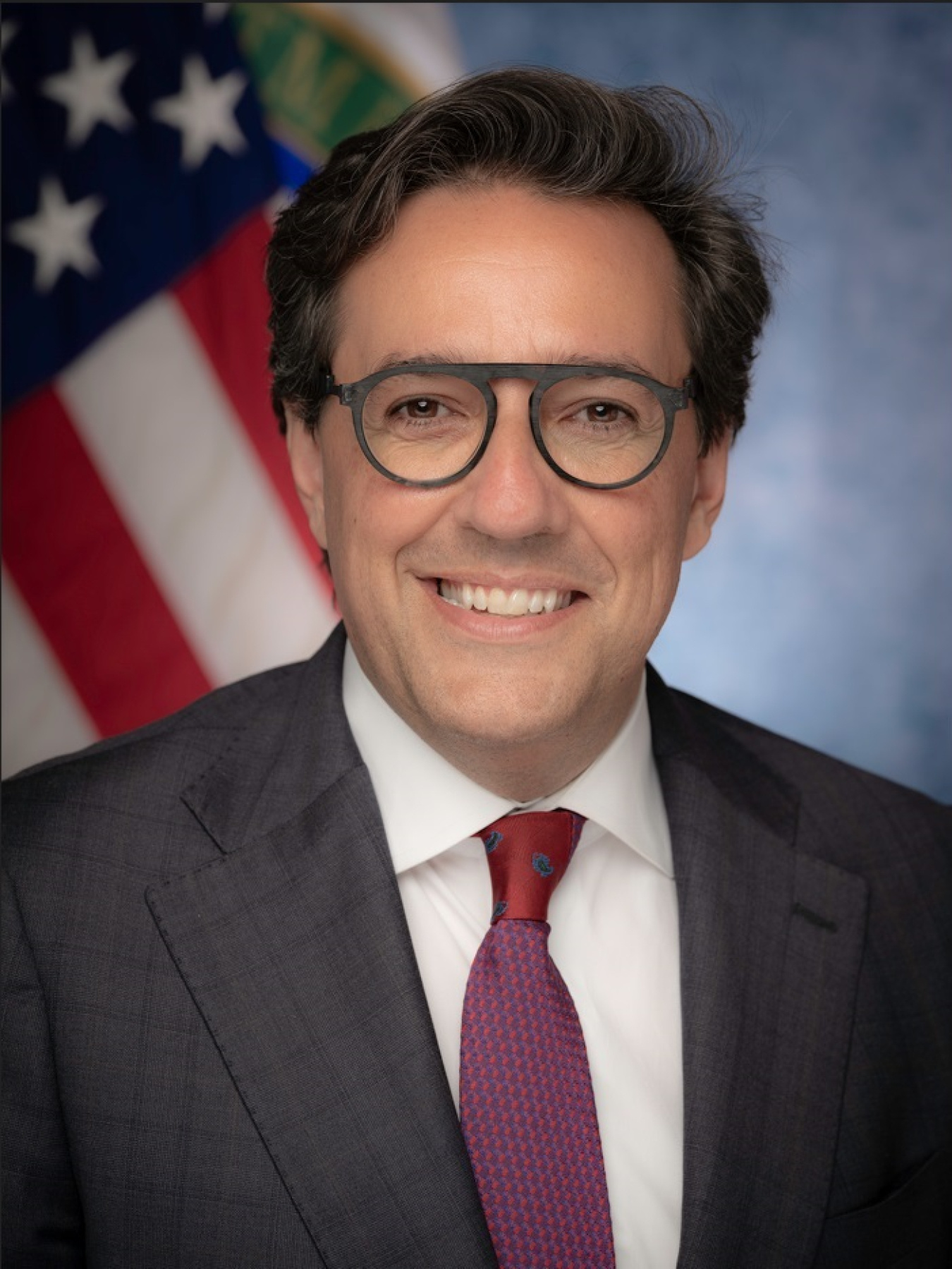
- Incumbent; Darío Gil since September 26, 2025
- United States Department of Energy
- Style: Mr. Under Secretary
- Member of: U. S. Department of Energy
- Reports to: U. S. Deputy Secretary of Energy
- Seat: Washington, D.C., United States
- Appointer: The president; with Senate advice and consent
- Term length: Appointed
- Formation: 2006
- First holder: Raymond L. Orbach
- Website: www.energy.gov

The under secretary for science and innovation, formerly the under secretary for science and energy, is a high-ranking position within the United States Department of Energy. The position was created by the Energy Policy Act of 2005, and the first under secretary for science, Raymond L. Orbach, was sworn in on June 1, 2006. The under secretary is appointed by the president of the United States and confirmed by the United States Senate. In March 2009, Steven E. Koonin was nominated to replace Orbach. Franklin (Lynn) M. Orr was sworn in as the under secretary for science and energy on December 17, 2014, and served in this position through the end of the Obama administration. He was followed in this position by Paul Dabbar in 2017 under the first Trump administration and by Geraldine L. Richmond in 2021 under the Biden administration. Darío Gil serves presently as under secretary. He was nominated by president Trump in January 2025 and took office in September 2025.

The under secretary serves as the secretary of energy's science and technology advisor, monitors the Department of Energy's research and development programs, and advises the secretary on any gaps or duplications in them. The under secretary advises the secretary on the management and the state of the national laboratories overseen by the department.

The under secretary also advises the secretary on the department's educational and training activities. Other aspects include advising the secretary on the coordinating and planning of research activities, advising the secretary on financial assistance for research activities, and carrying out additional duties assigned by the secretary, including supervising and supporting the lower-ranking assistant secretaries' research activities. In the words of the act, the under secretary is required to have "extensive background in science or engineering fields," and to be "well qualified to manage the civilian research and development programs of the Department."

The office was reorganized in 2022 to include the assistant secretaries of energy efficiency and renewable energy, fossil energy and carbon management, electricity, and nuclear energy, among other programs.

== List of under secretaries ==
No.	Portrait	Under secretary	Took office	Left office	Refs.
1		Raymond L. Orbach	June 1, 2006	May 2009	
2		Steven E. Koonin	May 19, 2009	November 18, 2011	
3		Franklin Orr	December 17, 2014	January 2017	
4		Paul Dabbar	November 7, 2017	January 20, 2021	
5		Geraldine L. Richmond	November 15, 2021	January 20, 2025	
6		Darío Gil	September 26, 2025	Present	
