= Dan Newlin =

American diplomat (born 1974)

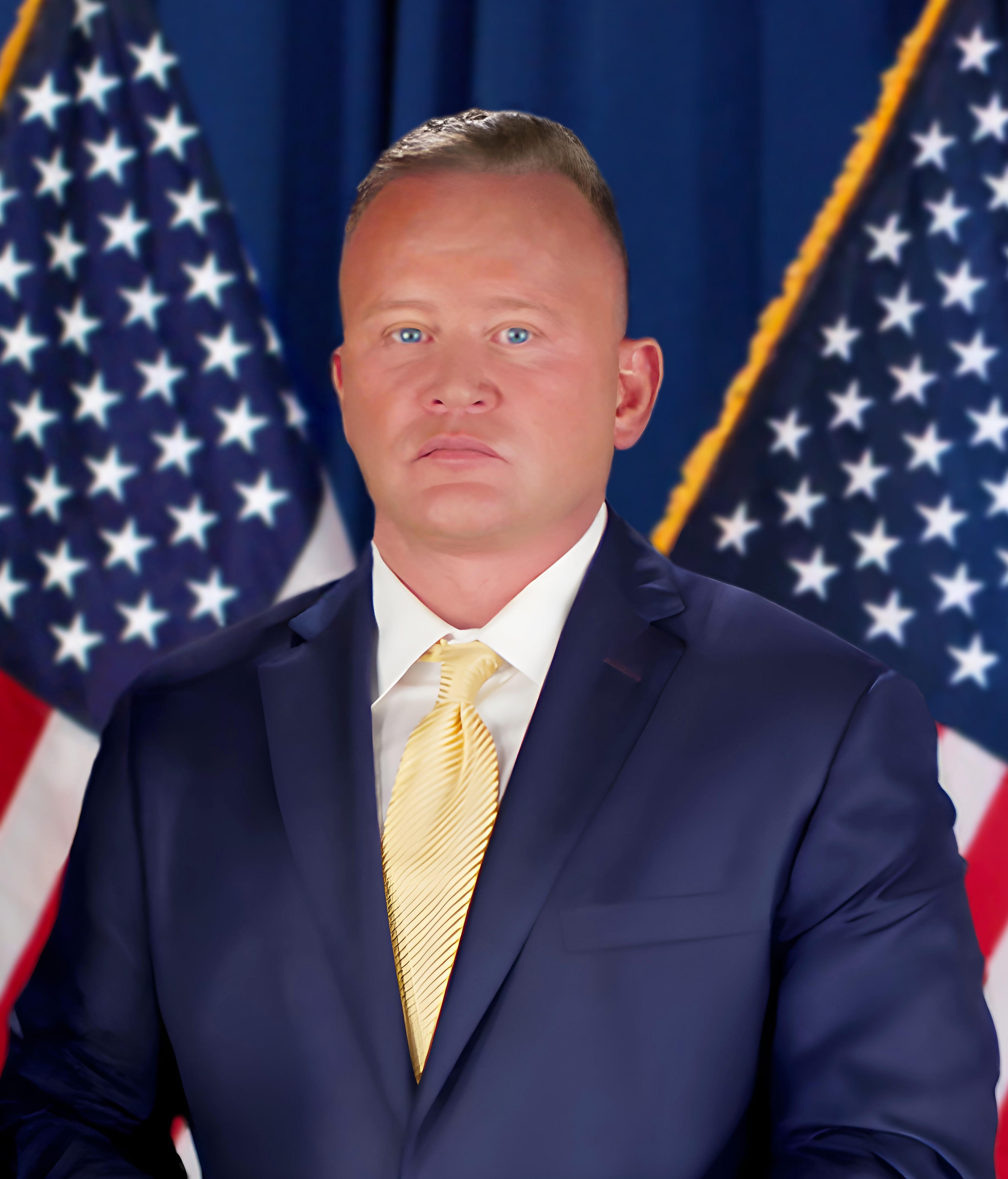
- Official portrait, 2025

United States Ambassador to Colombia Nominee
- Assuming office TBD
- President: Donald Trump
- Succeeding: John McNamara (Acting)

Personal details
- Born: Daniel James Newlin; March 1, 1980 (age 46) Chicago, Illinois, U.S.
- Party: Republican
- Children: 1
- Education: Florida State University (JD)
- Occupation: Lawyer; law enforcement officer; philanthropist
- Police career
- Allegiance: Orange County, Florida
- Department: Orange County Sheriff's Office
- Service years: 1998–2018
- Rank: Detective

Daniel James Newlin (born March 1, 1980) is an American attorney, businessman, and former law enforcement officer who is the nominee for United States ambassador to Colombia. He previously served as an Orange County deputy sheriff from 1998 to 2018. He founded Dan Newlin Injury Attorneys, a Florida and Illinois-based injury law firm, in 2001.

== Early life and career ==
Daniel James Newlin was born on March 1, 1980, in South Chicago to his steelworker father and school teacher mother and was raised in Valparaiso, Indiana.

He served in the Orange County Sheriff's Office from 1998 to 2018, reaching the rank of fugitive detective. Over the course of his career, he earned awards, medals, and commendations for his bravery and dedication to service. Newlin graduated from the Florida State University College of Law in December 2000. He has been a personal injury attorney in Central Florida since 2001.

In addition to his law enforcement career, Newlin founded Dan Newlin Injury Attorneys and has grown the firm into the second largest personal injury law firm in the country.

== Politics ==
For years, Newlin supported Democratic political candidates, including a $5,400 contribution to Hillary Clinton's 2016 presidential campaign and a $150,000 donation to the Florida Democratic Party in 2018. In 2022, he shifted his support and made several large political contributions to Republican candidates. During the 2024 presidential election, Newlin donated $1 million to the family of Corey Comperatore and spent at least $3 million on campaign advertisements for Donald Trump's 2024 presidential campaign.

In December 2021, Newlin organized a concert with country artists including Toby Keith, Clay Walker, and Trace Adkins to honor military personnel from every branch in Orlando in which Trump participated. From 2021 to 2024, Newlin worked full time traveling across the country, focusing primarily on swing states, to rally support for Trump's campaign producing and running his own ad campaign for Trump.

== Nomination as ambassador ==
On December 11, 2024, President-elect Donald Trump announced his intention to nominate Newlin as the next ambassador to Colombia. Newlin responded to the announcement by saying he was "proud and honored to have the opportunity”.

== Personal life ==
Newlin has a daughter. He lives in Windermere, Florida, and owns a ranch in Colombia.

== See also ==
- Ambassadors of the United States
