= Arthur Kerman =

Canadian-American physicist

Arthur Kent Kerman
- Born: May 3, 1929; Montreal, Quebec, Canada
- Died: 11 May 2017 (aged 88); Winchester, Massachusetts, U.S.
- Education: McGill University, BS Sc 1950; Massachusetts Institute of Technology, PhD 1953
- Employers: Massachusetts Institute of Technology; Assistant professor, 1956; Associate professor, 1960; Professor of physics, 1964; Director, Center for Theoretical Physics, 1976–1983; Director, Laboratory for Nuclear Science, 1983–1992; Professor emeritus, 1999–2017
- Spouse: Enid Ehrlich
- Children: 5

Arthur Kent Kerman (born May 3, 1929 – May 11, 2017) was a Canadian-American nuclear physicist, a fellow of the American Physical Society, Fellow of the American Academy of Arts and Sciences, and Fellow of the New York Academy of Sciences. He was a professor emeritus of physics at Massachusetts Institute of Technology's Center for Theoretical Physics (CTP) and Laboratory for Nuclear Science. He was known for his work on the theory of the structure of nuclei and on the theory of nuclear reactions.

== Education ==
Arthur Kent Kerman was born May 3, 1929, in Montreal. He graduated in 1950 from McGill University, where he studied physics and mathematics. At MIT, under Victor Frederick Weisskopf, he completed his PhD in nuclear surface oscillations in 1953. From 1953 to 1954, he studied with Robert F. Christy at Caltech under a National Research Council Postdoctoral Fellowship, and in 1954 he began a two-year stay at the Niels Bohr Institute for Theoretical Physics in Copenhagen.

== Career ==
Kerman joined the MIT faculty in 1956 as an assistant professor of physics. In the summers of 1959 and 1960 he was a research associate at the Argonne National Laboratory, and also was a consultant to the Shell Development Company of Houston, and the Knolls Atomic Power Laboratory. He also participated in the Physical Science Study Committee – a group of high school and university physics professors – to write a more accessible and engaging high school physics textbook. He was a consultant with Educational Services Inc. from 1959 to 1966, and collaborated in the quantum physics part of the experimental course Physics: A New Introductory Course (nicknamed PANIC), produced by the Education Research Center at MIT. He became an associate professor in 1960, and the following year, he went on academic leave and was "professeur d'echange" at the University of Paris under a John Simon Guggenheim Memorial Fellowship. He became professor in 1964.

In the early 1960s, Kerman traveled with physics professors Sheldon Glashow, then of the University of California at Berkeley and now of Boston University, and Charles Schwartz of Berkeley for a month-long visit as potential members to JASON, a scientific advisory group in Washington, sponsored by the Department of Defense and the Department of Energy, among other government groups.

"We were asked at the beginning of our particular interests," recalls Glashow. "What they were getting at was whether we wanted 'war' work or 'peace' work. Everybody, except us three 'lefties' including Arthur, chose 'war.' Our 'peaceful' challenge was to examine all available sources, whether classified or not, to assess the potential value of airborne or satellite surveillance of the Soviet Union and to produce a supposedly unclassified document. We did our work, and our document was promptly classified. We never heard back from JASON, nor did we care."

From 1976 to 1983, Kerman was the director of MIT's Center for Theoretical Physics, and from 1983 to 1992, he was director of the Laboratory for Nuclear Science. He had various longstanding consulting relationships with Argonne, Brookhaven, Knolls Atomic Power, Lawrence Berkeley, Lawrence Livermore, Los Alamos Scientific, and Oak Ridge national laboratories, and with the National Bureau of Standards (now NIST).

Kerman officially retired from MIT after 47 years, and retained the title of professor emeritus from 1999 until his death.

== Scientific contributions ==
Kerman's research included nuclear and high-energy physics, astrophysics, and the development of advanced particle detectors. His interests in theoretical nuclear physics included nuclear quantum chromodynamics-relativistic heavy-ion physics, nuclear reactions, and laser accelerators. He developed a set of nucleon-nucleon potentials, which were found to be useful for the study of nuclear matter and finite nuclei.

Kerman published or co-published more than 100 papers. He wrote papers on the effects of the Coriolis interaction in rotational nuclei; quasi-spin; the application of the Hartree-Fock method to the calculation of the ground state properties of spherical and deformed nuclei; pairing correlations in nuclei; and the possible existence of transuranic islands of stability. In his research on reactions, his papers discussed the scattering of fast particles by nuclei. He also wrote papers on intermediate structure in nuclear reactions; on the properties of isobar analog states; and strangeness analog resonances. He was an early advocate of the importance of quarks for understanding nuclear physics. He developed a nucleon-nucleon potential with a soft core that fits nucleon-nucleon scattering data as well as potentials with a hard repulsive core do, which was found to be useful in the study of what is needed beyond scattering data to determine the properties of nuclear matter and finite nuclei.

== Scientific advisor ==
He served on many influential bodies, including the Visiting Committees of Bartol Research Foundation, Princeton-Penn Accelerator, the National Academy of Sciences Committee on Inertial Confinement Fusion; National Ignition Facility Programs Review Committee at Livermore; Directorate and Division Review Committees at Livermore; the Relativistic Heavy Ion Collider Policy Committee at Brookhaven; Stanford Linear Accelerator Center Scientific Policy Committee; Secretary of Energy Fusion Policy Advisory Committee; the White House Science Council Panel on Science and Technology; the Department of Energy's Inertial Confinement Fusion Advisory Committee, and the Los Alamos Neutron Science Center Advisory Board. At Los Alamos National Laboratory, he was on the Physics Division Advisory Committee and the Theory Advisory Committee. At Lawrence Livermore National Laboratory, he served on the Director's Advisory Committee, the Physics and Space Technology Advisory Committee, and as chair, the Director's Review Committee for the Physics Directorate.

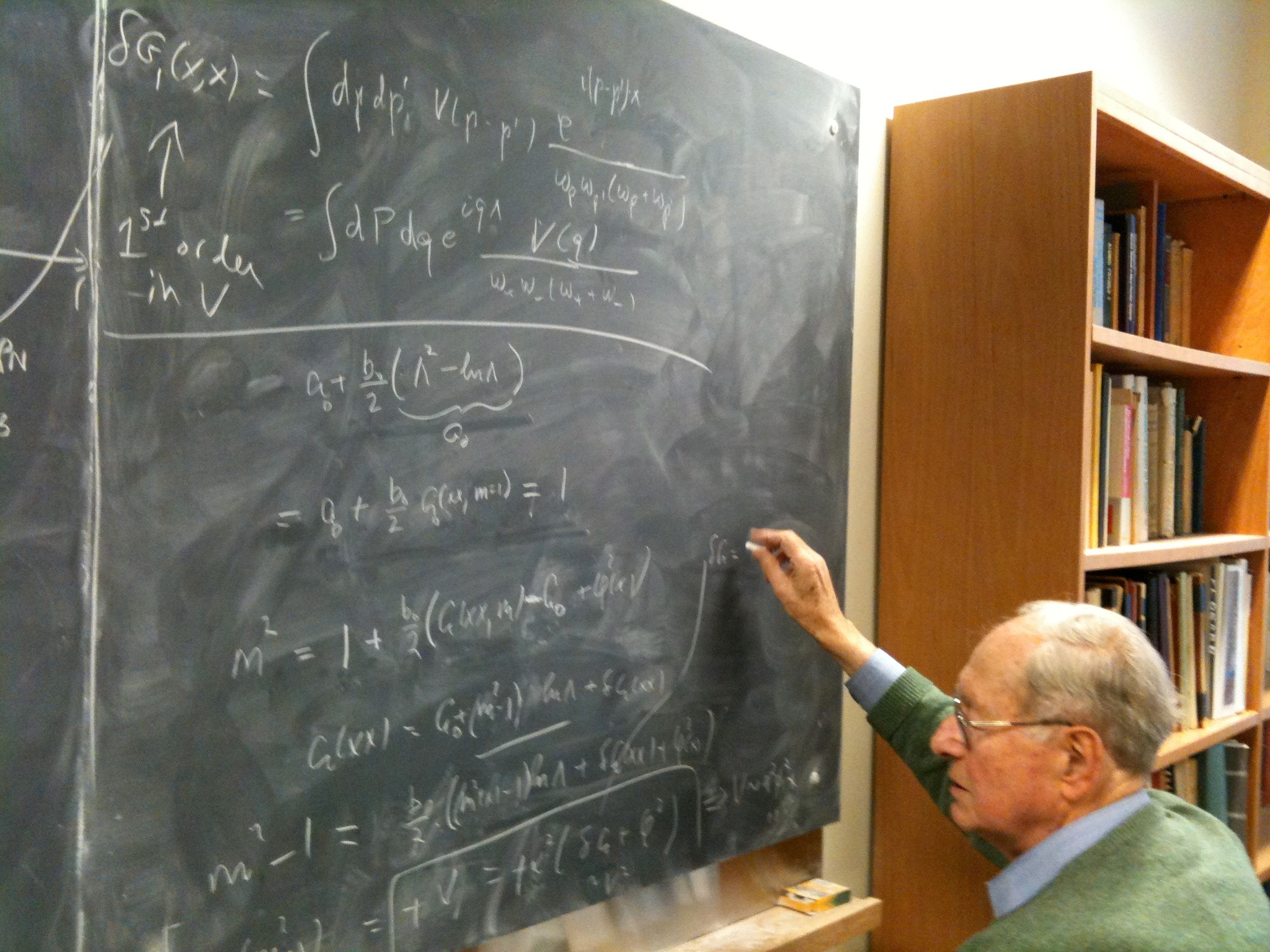
Arthur Kerman at the blackboard.

== Recognition and impact ==
Kerman was made a fellow of the American Physical Society, Fellow of the American Academy of Arts and Sciences, and Fellow of the New York Academy of Sciences; he was named a Guggenheim Fellow in Natural Sciences. He was associate editor of Reviews of Modern Physics.

== Personal life ==
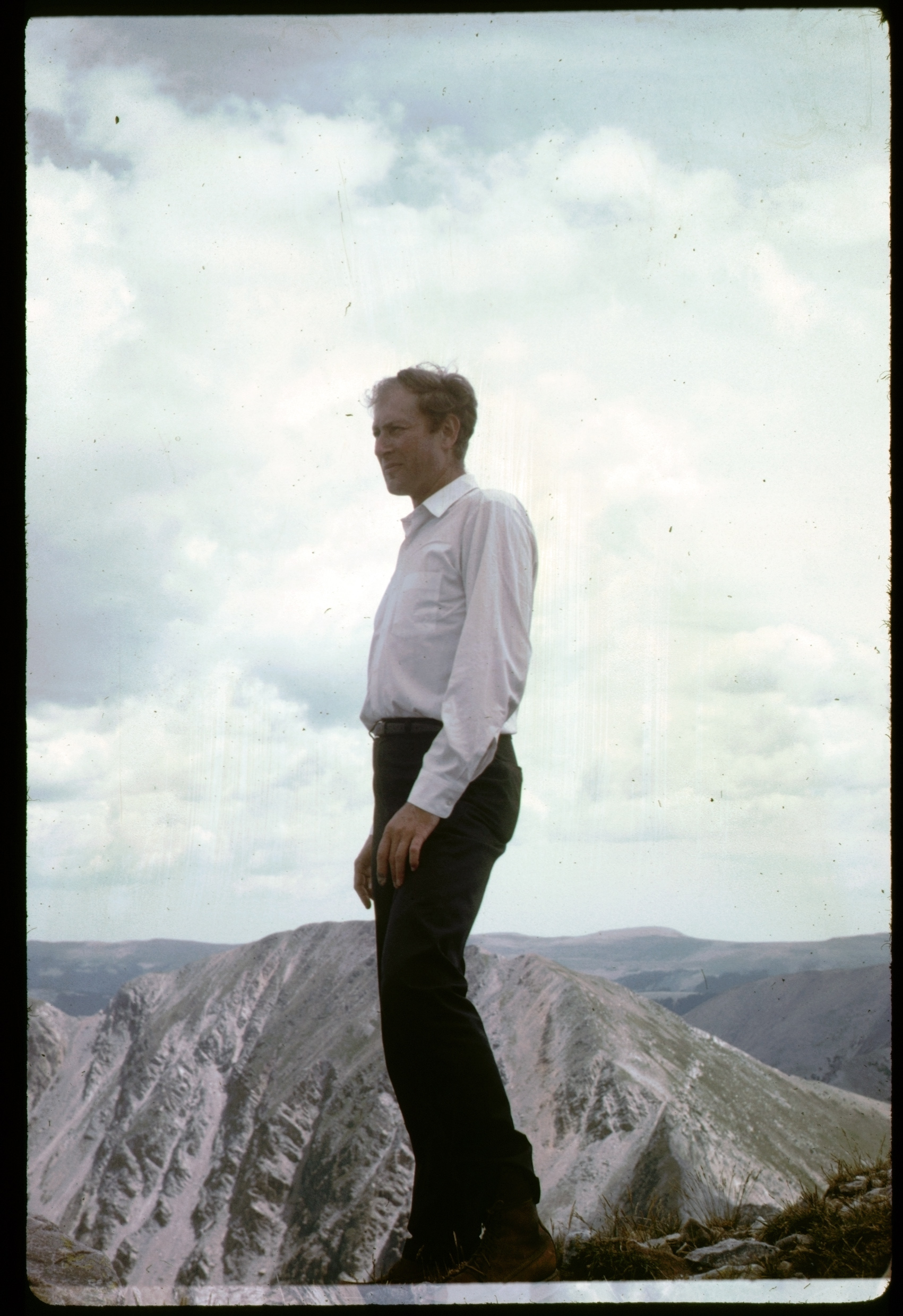
Kerman on Loveland Pass, Colorado

A long-time resident of Winchester, Massachusetts, Kerman was the husband of Enid Ehrlich for 64 years, with whom he raised five children. Kerman died in Winchester on May 11, 2017.

== Publications ==
- A.K. Kerman, Nuclear surface oscillations, Physical Review, Volume 92, 1953, pp. 1176–1183.
- D.M Brink, A.K. Kerman: Two body forces in light deformed nuclei, Nuclear Physics, Volume 12, 1959, pp. 314–326.
- A.K. Kerman, A. Klein : The description of rotating nuclei, Physics Letters, Volume 1, 1962, pp. 185–187.
- A.K. Kerman, A. Klein: Generalized Hartree-Fock approximation for the calculation of collective states of a finite many-particle system, Physical Review, Volume 132, 1963, pp. 1326–1342
- A. Klein, A.K. Kerman: Collective motion in finite many particle systems, Part 2, Phys. Rev., Volume 138, 1965, pp. B 1323-1323
- A. Klein, L. Celenza, A.K. Kerman, Collective Motion in Finite Many-Particle Systems. III. Foundations of a Theory of Rotational Spectra of Deformed Nuclei, Physical Review, Volume 140, 1964, B 234-263
- A.K. Kerman, Pairing forces and nuclear collective motion, Annals of Physics, Volume 12, 1961, pp. 300–329.
