= Darío Gil =

Spanish-American administrator of research

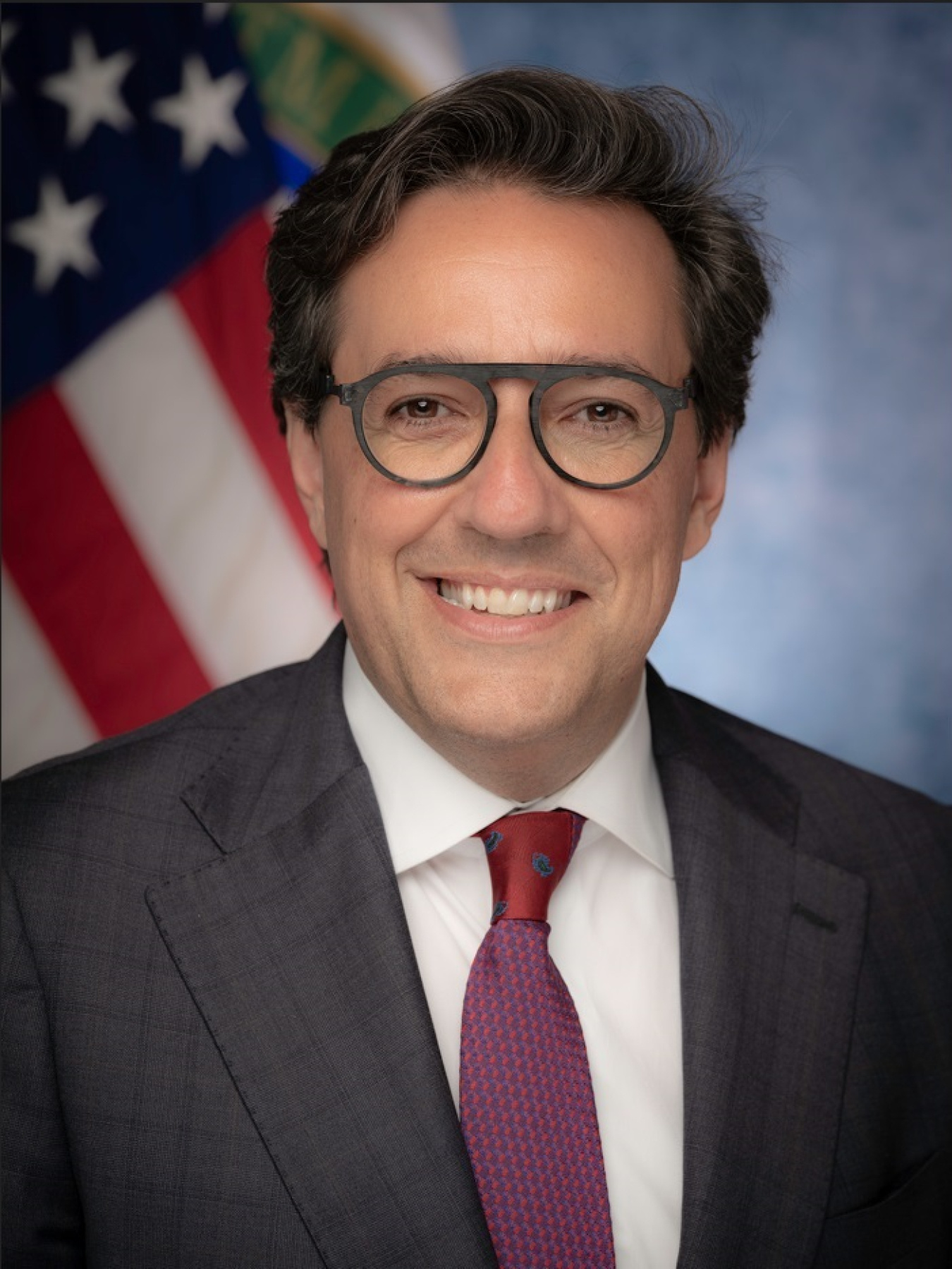
- Official portrait, 2025

Under Secretary of Energy for Science and Innovation
- Incumbent
- Assumed office September 26, 2025
- President: Donald Trump
- Preceded by: Geraldine L. Richmond

Personal details
- Born: El Palmar, Murcia, Spain
- Education: Los Altos High School (Los Altos, California); Stevens Institute of Technology (B. Eng.)
- Alma mater: Massachusetts Institute of Technology (Ph.D.)

Darío Gil is a Spanish administrator of research who is serving as the Under Secretary of Energy for Science and Innovation.

== Early life and education ==
Born in El Palmar, Murcia, Spain, Gil moved to the United States, while retaining Spanish citizenship. He graduated high school at Los Altos High in 1993, earned a Bachelor of Engineering from Stevens Institute of Technology in 1998, and earned a Ph.D. from Massachusetts Institute of Technology in 2003, specializing in nanostructures.

== Career ==
Gil became a director of research at IBM in 2019, focusing on AI, cloud, and quantum computing. He became a member of the National Science Board in 2020. On January 16, 2025, incoming President Donald Trump nominated Gil for the position of Undersecretary of Energy for Science and Innovation. Following his confirmation hearing on April 10, 2025, he was confirmed in a block of confirmation votes, 51–47 on September 18.
