= Susan Tsui Grundmann =

American lawyer & government official

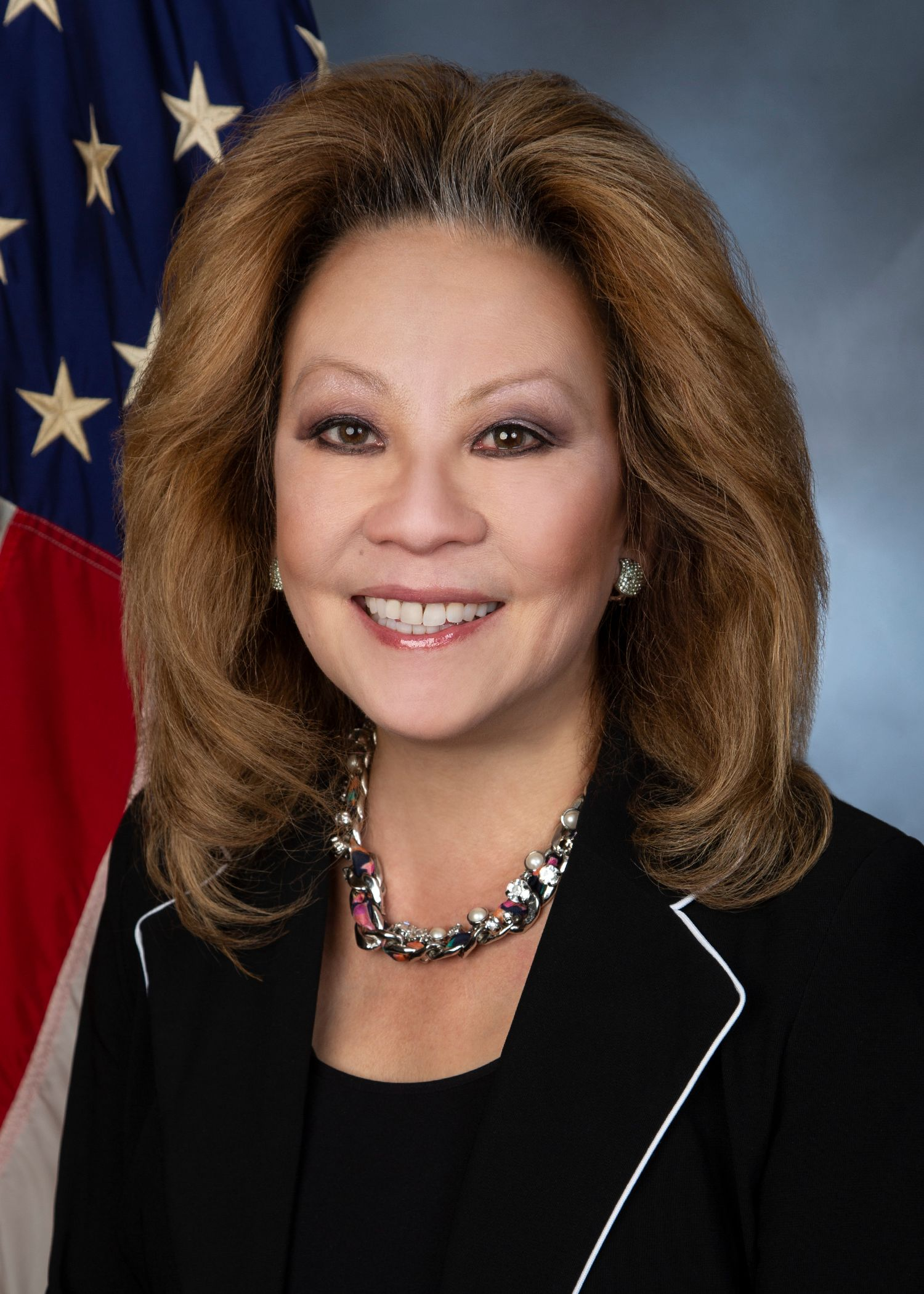

Chair of the Federal Labor Relations Authority
- In office January 3, 2023 – February 11, 2025
- President: Joe Biden; Donald Trump
- Preceded by: Ernest W. DuBester
- Succeeded by: Colleen Kiko

Member of the Federal Labor Relations Authority
- In office May 17, 2022 – February 11, 2025
- President: Joe Biden; Donald Trump
- Preceded by: James T. Abbott
- Succeeded by: Charles Arrington

Chair of the Merit Systems Protection Board
- In office November 12, 2009 – January 7, 2017
- President: Barack Obama
- Preceded by: Neil McPhie
- Succeeded by: Cathy Harris

Member of the Merit Systems Protection Board
- In office November 12, 2009 – January 7, 2017
- President: Barack Obama
- Preceded by: Neil McPhie
- Succeeded by: Tristan Leavitt

Personal details
- Party: Democratic
- Education: American University (BA); Georgetown University (JD)

Susan Tsui Grundmann is an American attorney and a member of the Federal Labor Relations Authority, serving as the authority's chair from 2023 to 2025. She is contesting her removal.

== Early life ==
Grundmann received a bachelor's degree at American University. She received her JD from the Georgetown University Law Center.

== Career ==
She was a law clerk for the 19th Judicial Circuit in Virginia.

She worked at the Sheet Metal Workers’ National Pension Fund. Grundmann served as General Counsel to the National Air Traffic Controllers Association. She taught law at the William W. Winpisinger Education and Technology Center from 2003-2009. Grundmann was general counsel for the National Federation of Federal Employees.

From 2009 until 2017, Grundmann served as the chairwoman of the Merit Systems Protection Board. She had been confirmed by voice vote.

Until nominated to the Federal Labor Relations Authority, Grundmann served as the executive director and Chief Operating Officer of the US Congress Office of Congressional Workplace Rights, formerly known as the Office of Compliance. In that role, she had testified before the US Congress. A major issue under her office's purview is dealing with sexual harassment in the Legislative Branch.

On March 30, 2022, the US Senate agreed to bring the debate to a close on her nomination to the Federal Labor Relations Authority. On May 12, 2022, the U.S. Senate voted 50-49 to confirm Grundmann's nomination.

On February 11, 2025, The Guardian reported that Grundmann had been dismissed by President Trump. According to federal law, FLRA members can only be fired for "inefficiency, neglect of duty or malfeasance in office". Government Executive reported that Grundman had sent an email to agency staff notifying them of her dismissal and had not said whether she would challenge the decision. She filed suit against the president on February 13. On March 12, Judge Sparkle L. Sooknanan of the U.S. District Court for the District of Columbia ruled that Grundmann's firing was improper and reinstated her to the board. On June 18, 2025, the decision was temporarily stayed by a panel of the U.S. Court of Appeals for the District of Columbia Circuit. In early July, an appeal court permitted the removal of Tsui Grundmann, based on recent Supreme Court decisions, as her lawsuit is considered.
