= Carolyn N. Lerner =

American judge (born 1965)

Carolyn Lerner
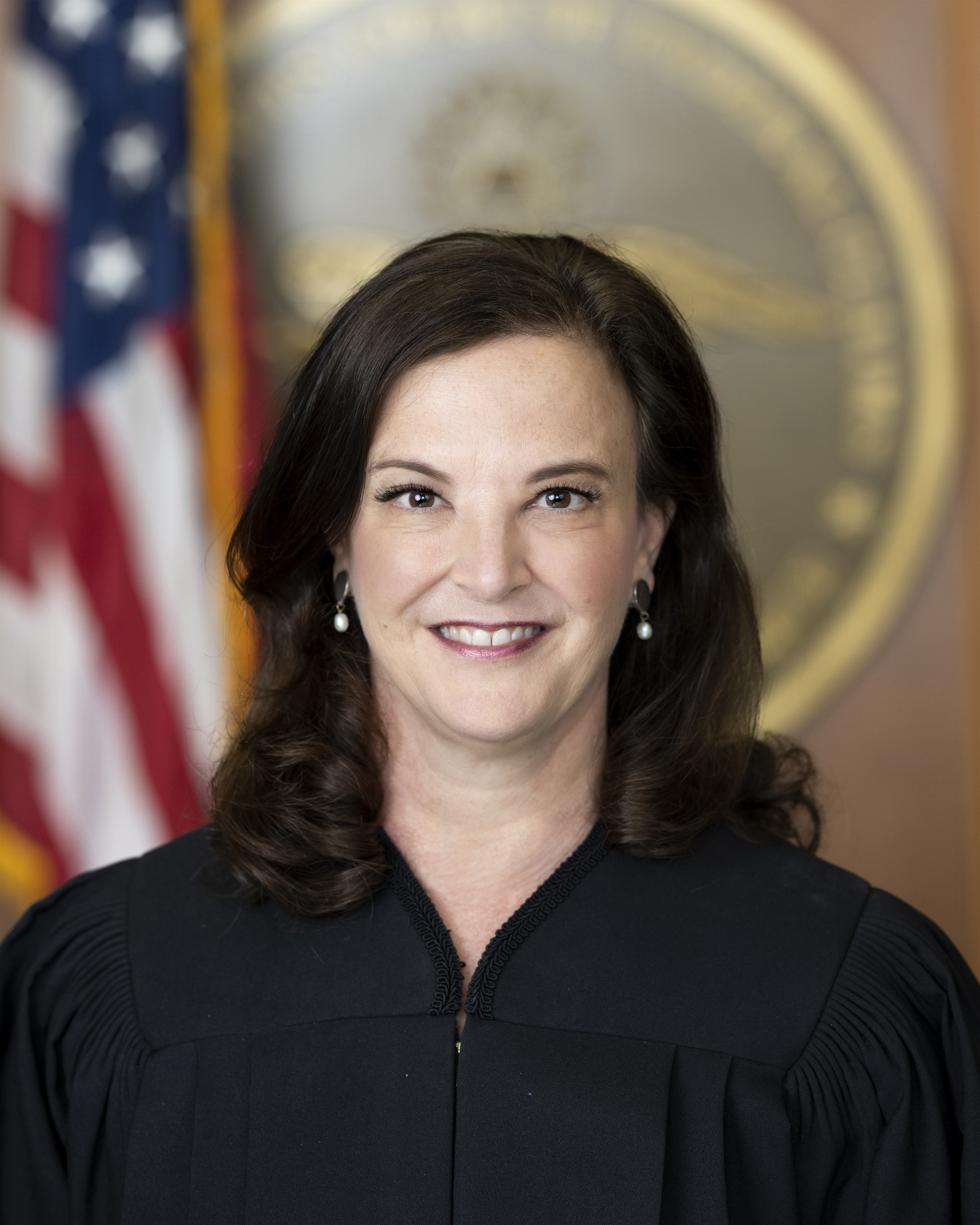

Judge of the United States Court of Federal Claims
- Incumbent
- Assumed office February 17, 2022
- Appointed by: Joe Biden
- Preceded by: Margaret M. Sweeney

Special Counsel of the United States
- In office April 2011 – June 2017
- President: Barack Obama; Donald Trump
- Preceded by: Scott Bloch
- Succeeded by: Henry Kerner

Personal details
- Born: January 13, 1965 (age 61) Detroit, Michigan, U.S.
- Education: University of Michigan (BGS); New York University (JD)

Carolyn Nancy Lerner (born January 13, 1965) is an American lawyer who serves as a judge of the United States Court of Federal Claims.

== Early life and education ==
Lerner was born on January 13, 1965, in Detroit. She received her Bachelor of General Studies with distinction, from the Honors College at the University of Michigan in 1986 and her Juris Doctor from the New York University Law School in 1989, where she was a Root-Tilden Scholar.

== Career ==
Lerner served as a law clerk for Chief Judge Julian A. Cook of the United States District Court for the Eastern District of Michigan. From 1991 to 1996, she was a litigation attorney at Kator, Scott, Heller & Huron in Washington, D.C. In 1997, she was a founding partner of the law firm Heller, Huron, Chertkof, Lerner, Simon & Salzman, practicing at that firm until 2011. From 2003 to 2005, she served as the Special Inspector for the Office of Special Inspector at the D.C. Department of Corrections. She was also the Special Master for the U.S. District Court for the District of Columbia in a sexual harassment and retaliation class action. She was previously unanimously confirmed to head the U.S. Office of Special Counsel, where she served from 2011 to 2017. Since 2018, Lerner has been an adjunct law professor at Georgetown University Law Center, and was previously an adjunct law professor at George Washington University Law School from 2007 to 2010. From 2017 to 2022, she was the chief circuit mediator for the U.S. Courts of the D.C. Circuit.

=== Claims court service ===
On June 30, 2021, President Joe Biden announced his intent to nominate Lerner to serve as a judge of the United States Court of Federal Claims. On July 13, 2021, her nomination was sent to the Senate. President Biden nominated Lerner to the seat vacated by Judge Margaret M. Sweeney, who assumed senior status on October 23, 2020. A hearing on her nomination before the Senate Judiciary Committee was scheduled to take place on August 11, 2021, but was postponed. On October 6, 2021, a hearing on her nomination was held before the Senate Judiciary Committee. On October 28, 2021, her nomination was reported out of committee by a voice vote, with Senators Mike Lee, Josh Hawley, and Marsha Blackburn voting "nay" on record. On December 18, 2021, the Senate confirmed Lerner by a voice vote. She received her judicial commission on February 17, 2022. She took the oath of office on February 18, 2022.

Legal offices
| Preceded by Margaret M. Sweeney | Judge of the United States Court of Federal Claims; 2022–present | Incumbent |
