= Bessent v. Dellinger =

- Supreme Court of the United States
- Full case name: Scott Bessent, Secretary of the Treasury, et al. v. Hampton Dellinger, Special Counsel of the Office of Special Counsel
- Docket no.: 24A790

Bessent v. Dellinger was a 2025 case in which lawyer Hampton Dellinger challenged his firing from the United States Office of Special Counsel.

On February 12, 2025, the U.S. District Court for the District of Columbia issued a temporary restraining order preventing Secretary of the Treasury Scott Bessent and several other officials from executing the without-cause firing until a February 26 hearing. It was the first case during the second presidency of Donald Trump to reach the Supreme Court, and the court ruled to allow the order to stand given its short duration.

The District Court later ruled that Dellinger should remain at his post, stating that the Office of Special Counsel must be independent or it cannot perform its function. On March 5, the United States Court of Appeals for the District of Columbia Circuit lifted the injunction pending appeal, allowing Dellinger's firing to go into effect. Dellinger dropped his lawsuit the following day.

== Firing ==
On February 7, 2025, the White House Presidential Personnel Office fired Hampton Dellinger from his position as head of the Office of Special Counsel. This Office of Special Counsel is an independent agency established in the 1970s to investigate retaliation against government whistleblowers and other civil service crimes. By law, the President can only dismiss its head for "inefficiency, neglect of duty, or malfeasance in office." The email that the Presidential Personnel Office sent to Dellinger did not cite any of these reasons. Dellinger sued, arguing that he had been illegally fired. Dellinger was nominated by President Joe Biden in 2023 and confirmed by the Senate the following year for a five-year term.

== Temporary restraining order ==
On February 12, 2025, Judge Amy Berman Jackson of the US District Court for the District of Columbia issued a two-week temporary restraining order allowing Dellinger to maintain his position until his hearing for a preliminary injunction.

The U.S. Court of Appeals for the D.C. Circuit left this order in place three days later in a 2–1 opinion, saying that Trump's claims of extraordinary harm failed to justify an immediate appeal from the District Court. The two supporting judges, Florence Pan and J. Michelle Childs, were both appointed by President Joe Biden, while the dissenting judge, Gregory Katsas, was appointed during Trump's first term.

=== Appeal to Supreme Court ===
President Trump appealed the case to the Supreme Court, arguing that judicial limits on his Executive Branch authority would violate the separation of powers. Among four amicus briefs filed before the Supreme Court, multiple state governments wrote to support Trump's authority to fire Dellinger. The New Civil Liberties Alliance similarly argued that the president must have "absolute removal authority."

Conversely, a group of former public officials asked the Court to uphold the temporary restraining order, opining that the Supreme Court should decide the case's constitutional questions after the District Court's proceedings. Another brief submitted by financial regulation professors advocated for preserving Federal Reserve's independence regardless of the Supreme Court's overall holding.

In an unsigned opinion issued on February 21, 2025, the Supreme Court chose to hold the motion to vacate the District Court's temporary restraining order in abeyance until its expiration, effectively allowing the order to stand. The Supreme Court opined that the imminent end of this temporary restraining order made appellate interference unnecessary.

Justices Sonia Sotomayor and Ketanji Brown Jackson wrote that they would outright deny the application to vacate. Conversely, Justice Neil Gorsuch wrote a dissent joined by Justice Samuel Alito. Gorsuch cited Grupo Mexicano de Desarrollo, S.A. v. Alliance Bond Fund, Inc. (1999) and In re Sawyer (1888) respectively for the propositions that the equitable remedies of federal courts are limited to those available when the Judiciary Act of 1789 was passed, and that by 1888 it was "well settled that a court of equity has no jurisdiction over the appointment and removal of public officers."

== Further proceedings ==
On February 26, Judge Amy Berman Jackson extended the temporary restraining order through March 1 so that she could write an opinion.

On March 1, she made the injunction against the firing permanent and forbade the administration from acting in any way as if Dellinger had been removed. In her 67-page opinion, Judge Jackson stressed that Congress had made the Office of Special Counsel independent because it could not otherwise perform its function of preventing patronage and corruption in the Executive Branch.

On March 5, the Court of Appeals for the D.C. Circuit stayed the district court's order of March 1, except to the extent that order vacated the temporary restraining order of February 12. The appellate court's order "gives effect to the removal of appellee from his position as Special Counsel of the U.S. Office of Special Counsel." Dellinger then dropped his lawsuit, accepting his dismissal.
