= Ernest W. DuBester =

American lawyer (born 1950)

Ernie DuBester
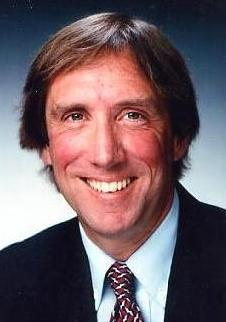

Chair of the Federal Labor Relations Authority
- In office January 21, 2021 – January 3, 2023
- President: Joe Biden
- Preceded by: Colleen Kiko
- Succeeded by: Susan Tsui Grundmann
- In office January 5, 2017 – January 25, 2017
- President: Barack Obama; Donald Trump
- Preceded by: Carol Waller Pope
- Succeeded by: Patrick Pizzella (acting)
- In office January 15, 2013 – November 12, 2013
- President: Barack Obama
- Preceded by: Carol Waller Pope
- Succeeded by: Carol Waller Pope

Member of the Federal Labor Relations Authority
- In office August 17, 2009 – January 3, 2023
- President: Barack Obama; Donald Trump; Joe Biden
- Preceded by: Dale Cabaniss (seat 1); Carol Waller Pope (seat 2)
- Succeeded by: Colleen Kiko (seat 1); Anne Wagner (seat 2)

Personal details
- Born: Ernest William DuBester; September 4, 1950 (age 74); Passaic, New Jersey, U.S.
- Political party: Democratic
- Spouse: Karen Kremer
- Education: Boston College (BA); Catholic University (JD); Georgetown University (LLM)

Ernest William "Ernie" DuBester (born September 4, 1950) is an American lawyer, academic, and government official who has served as a member of the Federal Labor Relations Authority from 2009 to 2023. He began his career at the National Labor Relations Board as counsel to former chairman and member John H. Fanning. DuBester was also a union attorney with the firm of Highsaw & Mahoney, and legislative counsel to the AFL–CIO. From 1993 to 2001, he was chairman and member at the National Mediation Board. From 2001 to 2005, DuBester was the professor and director of the Dispute Resolution Program at the Antonin Scalia Law School.

He served as chair of the FLRA in 2013, 2017, and from 2021 to 2023. He was nominated for a new term as FLRA member but his nomination expired at the end of the 117th Congress and was not resubmitted to the Senate.
