= James T. Abbott =

American attorney and government official

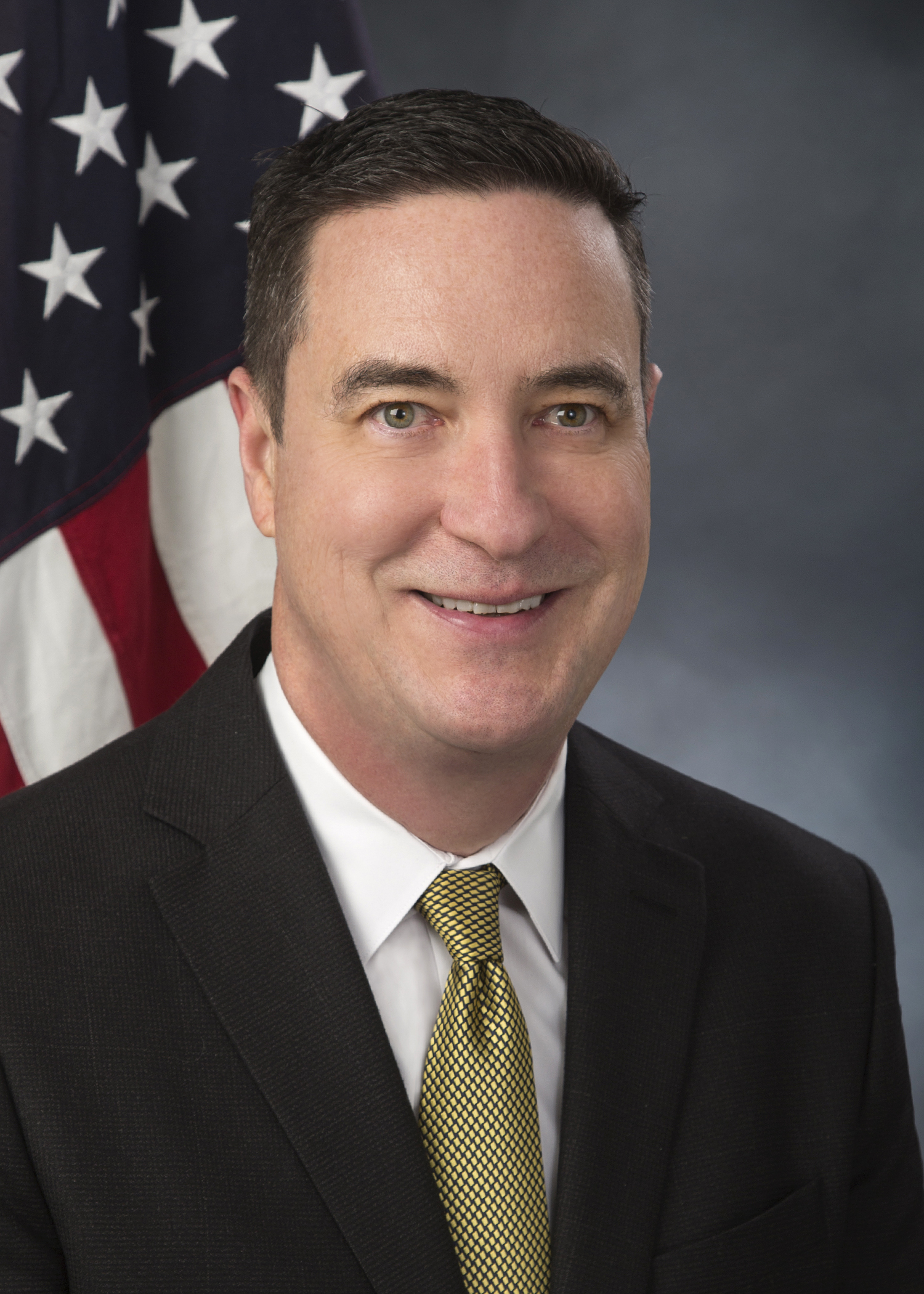

Member of the Federal Labor Relations Authority
- In office December 11, 2017 – May 17, 2022
- President: Donald Trump; Joe Biden
- Preceded by: Patrick Pizzella
- Succeeded by: Susan Tsui Grundmann

Personal details
- Born: James Thomas Abbott
- Political party: Republican
- Spouse: Daniel Gri
- Children: 2
- Education: Malone College (BA); Temple University (JD)

James Thomas Abbott is an American attorney and government official who was a member of the Federal Labor Relations Authority (FLRA) from 2017 to 2022. Before his service with the FLRA, Abbott served as Deputy General Counsel for the United States Congress Office of Compliance from 2004 to 2007. Earlier in his career, he was the Senior Associate District Counsel for Personnel and Ethics at the Defense Contract Management Agency; Chief Counsel at Corpus Christi Army Depot, United States Army Materiel Command; and Senior Labor Counsel at the HQ Depot Systems Command, U.S. Army Materiel Command. On May 31, 2023, the U.S. Department of Justice filed a lawsuit against Abbott seeking civil penalties for Abbott's willful refusal to file mandatory ethics disclosures.
