= Patrick Pizzella =

American government official (born 1954)

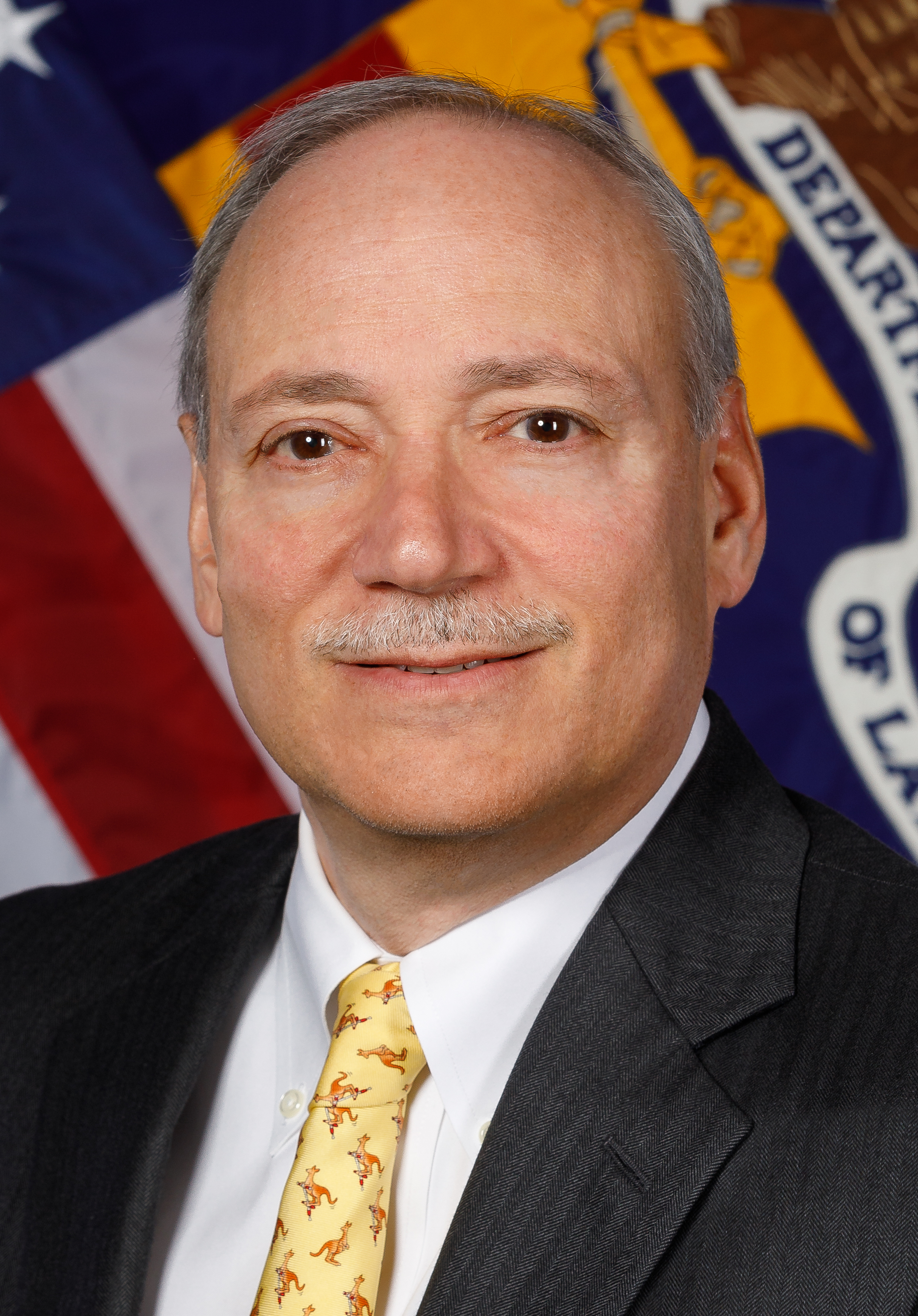
- Official portrait, 2018

36th United States Deputy Secretary of Labor
- In office April 17, 2018 – January 20, 2021
- President: Donald Trump
- Preceded by: Chris Lu
- Succeeded by: Julie Su

Acting United States Secretary of Labor
- In office July 20, 2019 – September 30, 2019
- President: Donald Trump
- Preceded by: Alexander Acosta
- Succeeded by: Eugene Scalia

Chair of the Federal Labor Relations Authority
- Acting
- In office January 25, 2017 – December 11, 2017
- President: Donald Trump
- Preceded by: Ernest W. DuBester
- Succeeded by: Colleen Kiko

Member of the Federal Labor Relations Authority
- In office November 12, 2013 – December 31, 2017
- President: Barack Obama; Donald Trump
- Preceded by: Thomas Beck
- Succeeded by: James T. Abbott

United States Assistant Secretary of Labor for Administration and Management
- In office May 9, 2001 – January 20, 2009
- President: George W. Bush
- Preceded by: Patricia Watkins Lattimore
- Succeeded by: T. Michael Kerr

Personal details
- Born: May 19, 1954 (age 72) New Rochelle, New York, U.S.
- Party: Republican
- Spouse: M. J. Jameson
- Education: University of South Carolina (BS)

Patrick Pizzella (born May 19, 1954) is a former American government official who served as the 36th United States Deputy Secretary of Labor from April 17, 2018 to January 20, 2021. He was formerly a member of the Federal Labor Relations Authority appointed by President Barack Obama. He held positions in several agencies during four prior Administrations. In 2019, after the resignation of Alexander Acosta, Pizzella served as the acting United States Secretary of Labor for more than 2 months. He currently serves as the elected Mayor of the village of Pinehurst, North Carolina.

== Early life and education ==
Pizzella was born on May 19, 1954. He is a native of New Rochelle, New York. Pizzella is a graduate of Iona Preparatory School. He received a Bachelor of Science degree in business administration from the University of South Carolina.

== Career ==
Pizzella worked as a political field staffer for Ronald Reagan's 1976 campaign for the Republican presidential nomination, then spent four years, from 1977 to 1980, as executive director of right-to-work committees in New Mexico and Delaware.

=== Reagan administration, 1981–1989 ===
From 1981 to 1982, Pizzella served on the staff of the General Services Administration (GSA), and from 1983 to 1985, he was the special assistant to the Administrator of the GSA. In 1985, he became special assistant to the Associate Deputy Administrator for Management and Administration at the Small Business Administration (SBA). In 1986, Pizzella served as Director of Intergovernmental and Regional Affairs at the SBA.

From 1986 to 1988 he served as Administrator for Management Services, and from 1988 to 1989, he was the Deputy Under Secretary for Management, both at the United States Department of Education (nominated in September 1988, then a recess appointment in November). Pizzella's stay at the Education Department was short-lived, as he and several other conservative Reagan appointees resigned in March 1989, in a move hailed by liberals as a return to "collaborative efforts between the special-interest groups and the Department of Education" following William J. Bennett's tenure. However, Pizzella was not replaced, and his Senate nomination withdrawn, until September 1989.

=== Federal Housing Finance Board ===
In 1989, Pizzella was recruited by U.S. Housing and Urban Development Secretary Jack F. Kemp to serve at the new Federal Housing Finance Board (FHFB), created as part of the 1989 savings-and-loan bailout legislation, to oversee the 12 Federal Home Loan Banks and channel some of their profits (as much as $100 million in 1992) into housing programs. Pizzella served first as a consultant, then for five years (1990–95) as the FHFB's Director of the Office of Administration, the last two years while Bill Clinton was President).

=== Private sector, 1996–2001 ===
Pizzella worked at Preston Gates Ellis & Rouvelas Meeds LLP as director of coalitions from 1996 to 1997, and as government affairs counselor from 1998 to 2001. He worked for lobbyist Jack Abramoff at Preston Gates, but was not among the 21 Abramoff associates who were convicted of or pleaded guilty to wrongdoing in connection with their work. During this time, he contributed to The Heritage Foundation's policy development on civil service reform.

=== George W. Bush administration, 2001–09 ===
After the election of George W. Bush in November 2000, Pizzella assisted the presidential transition by serving for several months as acting chief of staff at the United States Office of Personnel Management.

On March 6, 2001, Bush announced his nomination of Pizzella to serve as Assistant Secretary of Labor for Administration and Management at the United States Department of Labor. His nomination was approved without a hearing by the Senate Health Committee, and was confirmed by the Senate on May 9, 2001. He served in this position until January 2009.

Pizzella was designated by President George W. Bush to serve as a member of the board of directors of the Overseas Private Investment Corporation from January 18, 2004, to April 26, 2005.

=== 2009–2013 ===
Pizzella ran his own consulting firm and was principal at Patrick Pizzella LLC, a position he held from 2009 to 2013. He was cited in an editorial by The Wall Street Journal, and authored articles in the Washington Examiner, The American Spectator, Government Technology magazine, and GCN magazine.

=== Federal Labor Relations Authority, 2013–17 ===
In August 2013, President Barack Obama nominated Pizzella to fill the Republican (minority party) position on the three-member Federal Labor Relations Authority; he was confirmed by the U.S. Senate on October 16, 2013. Pizzella was nominated again by Obama for the same position in November 2015, for a five-year term ending July 1, 2020, but the Senate failed to act on the nomination by the time it adjourned in January 2017, and the nomination expired.

On January 23, 2017, Pizzella was designated by President Donald Trump to be the Acting Chairman of the FLRA.

=== United States Department of Labor, 2018–2021 ===
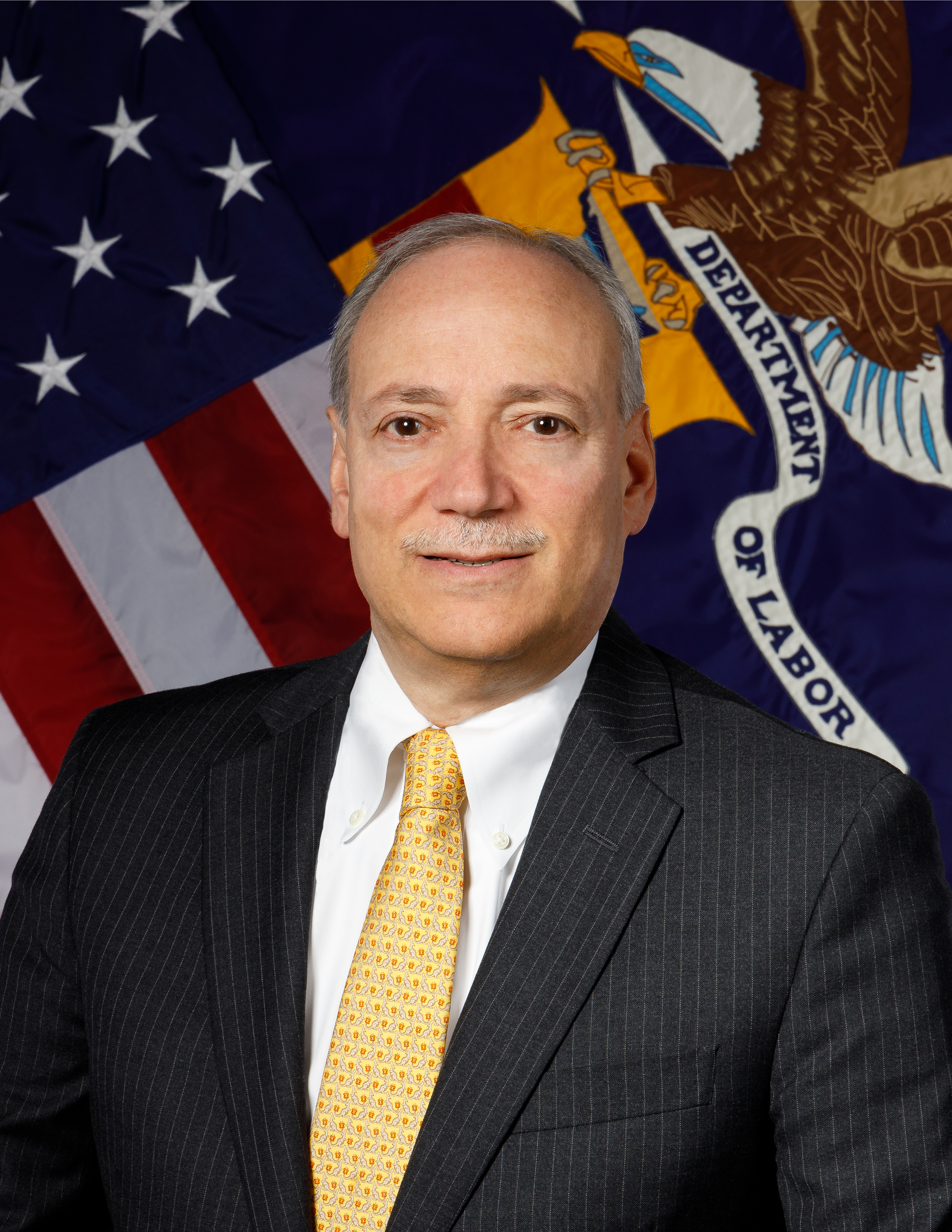
Pizzella's official portrait during the Trump administration

==== Deputy Secretary of Labor ====
On June 19, 2017, Trump announced his intent to nominate Pizzella to be the next United States Deputy Secretary of Labor, replacing acting Deputy Secretary Nancy Rooney. On June 20, 2017, his nomination was sent to the United States Senate. After the end of the 2017 congressional session, Pizzella's nomination was re-delivered to the Senate in January 2018, and was referred to the United States Senate Committee on Health, Education, Labor and Pensions.

Cloture was invoked on Pizzella's nomination on April 11, 2018, and he was confirmed as Deputy Secretary on the following day; both the cloture and the vote on the nomination passed by 50–48 votes in the Senate.

==== Acting Secretary of Labor ====
On July 12, 2019, following the resignation of Secretary Alex Acosta, Trump announced via Twitter that Pizzella would serve as acting Secretary of Labor. Trump nominated Eugene Scalia to succeed Acosta, and he was sworn in on September 30, 2019.

=== Private sector, 2021–present ===
After leaving government service in January 2021, Pizzella accepted an appointment to the Board of Directors of the Job Creators Network and the Leadership Institute. He has continued to author op-eds on labor issues for National Review, The Hill and Real Clear Politics, among other publications.

=== Councilman and mayor of Pinehurst, N.C., 2021–present ===
In November 2021, Pizzella was elected to the Village Council of Pinehurst, North Carolina, where he and his wife have owned a residence since 2012. Within a year of his election, he was named Mayor Pro Tem.

In November 2023, Councilman Pizzella was elected Mayor, capturing 2,477 votes, versus 1,892 for fellow Council member Jeff Morgan, and 765 for former Council member Kevin Drum. The Pilot newspaper called this "a strong statement for neighborhood protection from short-term rentals and excessive growth."

== Personal life ==
Pizzella is married to Mary Joy Jameson, former senior business development executive for Google, a senior public affairs aide in the Reagan, George H.W. Bush, and George W. Bush administrations, who in the 2010s served on the Clemson University Foundation Board.

Political offices
Preceded by Chris Lu	United States Deputy Secretary of Labor; 2018–2021	Succeeded by Julie Su
Preceded by Alexander Acosta	United States Secretary of Labor; Acting; 2019	Succeeded by Eugene Scalia
