= Title 5 of the Code of Federal Regulations =

US title on administrative personnel

CFR Title 5 – Administrative Personnel is one of fifty titles comprising the United States Code of Federal Regulations (CFR), containing the principal set of rules and regulations issued by federal agencies regarding administrative personnel. It is available in digital and printed form, and can be referenced online using the Electronic Code of Federal Regulations (e-CFR).

== Structure ==
The table of contents, as reflected in the e-CFR updated March 5, 2014, is as follows:

Volume	Chapter	Parts	Regulatory Entity
1	I	1–630	Office of Personnel Management
2		700–1199	Office of Personnel Management
3	II	1200–1299	Merit Systems Protection Board
	III	1300–1399	Office of Management and Budget
	V	1500–1599	The International Organizations Employees Loyalty Board
	VI	1600–1699	Federal Retirement Thrift Investment Board
	VIII	1800–1899	Office of Special Counsel
	IX	1900–1999	Appalachian Regional Commission
	XI	2100–2199	Armed Forces Retirement Home
	XIV	2400–2499	Federal Labor Relations Authority, General Counsel of the Federal Labor Relations Authority and Federal Service Impasses Panel
	XV	2500–2599	Office of Administration, Executive Office of the President
	XVI	2600–2699	Office of Government Ethics
	XXI	3100–3199	Department of the Treasury
	XXII	3200–3299	Federal Deposit Insurance Corporation
	XXIII	3300–3399	Department of Energy
	XXIV	3400–3499	Federal Energy Regulatory Commission
	XXV	3500–3599	Department of the Interior
	XXVI	3600–3699	Department of Defense
	XXVIII	3800–3899	Department of Justice
	XXIX	3900–3999	Federal Communications Commission
	XXX	4000–4099	Farm Credit System Insurance Corporation
	XXXI	4100–4199	Farm Credit Administration
	XXXIII	4300–4399	Overseas Private Investment Corporation
	XXXIV	4400–4499	Securities and Exchange Commission
	XXXV	4500–4599	Office of Personnel Management
	XXXVII	4700–4799	Federal Election Commission
	XL	5000–5099	Interstate Commerce Commission
	XLI	5100–5199	Commodity Futures Trading Commission
	XLII	5200–5299	Department of Labor
	XLIII	5300–5399	National Science Foundation
	XLV	5500–5599	Department of Health and Human Services
	XLVI	5600–5699	Postal Rate Commission
	XLVII	5700–5799	Federal Trade Commission
	XLVIII	5800–5899	Nuclear Regulatory Commission
	XLIX	5900–5999	Federal Labor Relations Authority
	L	6000–6099	Department of Transportation
	LII	6200–6299	Export-Import Bank of the United States
	LIII	6300–6399	Department of Education
	LIV	6400–6499	Environmental Protection Agency
	LV	6500–6599	National Endowment for the Arts
	LVI	6600–6699	National Endowment for the Humanities
	LVII	6700–6799	General Services Administration
	LVIII	6800–6899	Board of Governors of the Federal Reserve System
	LIX	6900–6999	National Aeronautics and Space Administration
	LX	7000–7099	United States Postal Service
	LXI	7100–7199	National Labor Relations Board
	LXII	7200–7299	Equal Employment Opportunity Commission
	LXIII	7300–7399	Inter-American Foundation
	LXIV	7400–7499	Merit Systems Protection Board
	LXV	7500–7599	Department of Housing and Urban Development
	LXVI	7600–7699	National Archives and Records Administration
	LXVII	7700–7799	Institute of Museum and Library Services
	LXVIII	7800–7899	Commission on Civil Rights
	LXIX	7900–7999	Tennessee Valley Authority
	LXX	8000–8099	Court Services and Offender Supervision Agency for the District of Columbia
	LXXI	8100–8199	Consumer Product Safety Commission
	LXXIII	8300–8399	Department of Agriculture
	LXXIV	8400–8499	Federal Mine Safety and Health Review Commission
	LXXVI	8600–8699	Federal Retirement Thrift Investment Board
	LXXVII	8700–8799	Office of Management and Budget
	LXXX	9000–9099	Federal Housing Finance Agency
	LXXXII	9200–9299	Special Inspector General for Iraq Reconstruction
	LXXXIII	9300–9399	Special Inspector General for Afghanistan Reconstruction
	LXXXIV	9400–9499	Bureau of Consumer Financial Protection
	LXXXVI	9600–9699	National Credit Union Administration
	XCVII	9700–9799	Department of Homeland Security Human Resources Management System (Department of Homeland –Office of Personnel Management)
	LCVII	9800–9899	Council of the Inspectors General on Integrity and Efficiency

== History ==
The CFR was authorized by President Franklin D. Roosevelt on October 11, 1938, as a means to organize and maintain the growing material published by federal agencies in the newly mandated Federal Register. The first volume of the CFR was published in 1939 with general applicability and legal effect in force June 1, 1938.

The Office of the Federal Register (OFR) began publishing yearly revisions for some titles in 1963 with legal effective dates of January 1 each year. By 1967 all 50 titles were updated annually and effective January 1.

The CFR was placed online in 1996. The OFR began updating the entire CFR online on a daily basis in 2001.
