= Hatch Act =

United States law

Hatch Act of 1939
- Long title: An Act to Prevent Pernicious Political Activities
- Enacted by: the 76th United States Congress
- Effective: August 2, 1939

Citations
- Public law: Pub. L. 76–252
- Statutes at Large: 53 Stat. 1147

Codification
- U.S.C. sections created: 5 U.S.C. §§ 7321–7326

Legislative history
- Introduced in the Senate as S. 1871 by Carl Hatch (D-NM); Passed the House on July 20, 1939 (241–134); Signed into law by President Franklin D. Roosevelt on August 2, 1939

Major amendments
- 1993, 2012

The Hatch Act of 1939, An Act to Prevent Pernicious Political Activities, is a United States federal law that prohibits civil service employees in the executive branch of the federal government, except the president and vice president, from engaging in some forms of political activity. It became law on August 2, 1939. The law was named for Senator Carl Hatch of New Mexico. It was most recently amended in 2012.

== Background ==
Widespread allegations that local Democratic Party politicians used employees of the Works Progress Administration (WPA) during the congressional elections of 1938 provided the immediate impetus for the passage of the Hatch Act. Criticism centered on swing states such as Kentucky, Tennessee, Pennsylvania, and Maryland. In Pennsylvania, Republicans and dissident Democrats publicized evidence that Democratic politicians were consulted on the appointment of WPA administrators and case workers and that they used WPA jobs to gain unfair political advantage. In 1938, a series of newspaper articles exposed WPA patronage, and political contributions in return for employment, prompting an investigation by the Senate Campaign Expenditures Committee, headed by Sen. Morris Sheppard, a Texas Democrat.

Despite that investigation's inconclusive findings, many in both parties determined to take action against the growing power of the WPA and its chief administrator, Harry Hopkins, an intimate of President Franklin Roosevelt. The Act was sponsored by Senator Carl Hatch, a Democrat from New Mexico. At the time, Roosevelt was struggling to purge the Democratic Party of its more conservative members, who were increasingly aligned with the administration's Republican opponents. The president considered vetoing the legislation or allowing it to become law without his signature, but instead signed it on the last day he could do so. His signing message welcomed the legislation as if he had called for it, and emphasized the protection his administration would provide for political expression on the part of public employees.

== Provisions ==
The 1939 Act forbids the intimidation or bribery of voters and restricts political campaign activities by federal employees. It prohibits using any public funds designated for relief or public works for electoral purposes. It forbids officials paid with federal funds from using promises of jobs, promotion, financial assistance, contracts, or any other benefit to coerce campaign contributions or political support. It provides that persons below the policy-making level in the executive branch of the federal government must not only refrain from political practices that would be illegal for any citizen, but must abstain from "any active part" in political campaigns, using this language to specify those who are exempt:

- (i) an employee paid from an appropriation for the Executive Office of the President; or
- (ii) an employee appointed by the President, by and with the advice and consent of the Senate, whose position is located within the United States, who determines policies to be pursued by the United States in the nationwide administration of Federal laws.

The act also precludes federal employees from membership in "any political organization which advocates the overthrow of our constitutional form of government", a provision meant to prohibit membership in organizations on the far left and far right, such as the Communist Party USA and the German-American Bund.

An amendment on July 19, 1940, extended the Act to certain employees of state and local governments whose positions are primarily paid for by federal funds. It has been interpreted to bar political activity on the part of employees of state agencies administering federal unemployment insurance programs and appointed local law enforcement agency officials with oversight of federal grant funds. The Hatch Act bars state and local government employees from running for public office if any federal funds support the position, even if the position is funded almost entirely with local funds.

The Merit Systems Protection Board and the Office of Special Counsel (OSC) are responsible for enforcement of the Hatch Act.

== Supreme Court challenges ==
The Supreme Court has several times declined to hear challenges to the act and has twice upheld its constitutionality. In a 1947 case brought by the CIO, a divided court found that Congress had properly exercised its authority as long as it had not affected voting rights. Justice William O. Douglas objected to the assertion that "clean politics" required the act's restrictions: "it would hardly seem to be imperative to muzzle millions of citizens because some of them, if left to their constitutional freedoms, might corrupt the political process." In 1973, in a case brought by the National Association of Letter Carriers, a 6 to 3 decision found the act neither too broad nor unclear. The court's three most liberal justices, Douglas, William J. Brennan, and Thurgood Marshall, dissented. Douglas wrote: "It is no concern of government what an employee does in his or her spare time, whether religion, recreation, social work or politics is his hobby, unless what he or she does impairs efficiency or other facets of the merits of his job."

== Amendments ==
In 1975, the House passed legislation allowing federal employees to participate in partisan elections and run for office, but the Senate took no action. In 1976, Democrats who controlled Congress had sought to win support by adding protections against the coercion of employees by their superiors and federal employee unions had supported the legislation. It passed the House on a vote of 241 to 164 and the Senate on a vote of 54 to 36. President Ford vetoed the legislation on April 12. He noted that coercion could be too subtle for the law to eliminate and that the Supreme Court had said in 1973 that the Hatch Act had achieved "a delicate balance between fair and effective government and the First Amendment rights of individual employees". President Carter proposed similar legislation in 1977.

A proposed amendment to permit federal workers to participate in political campaigns passed the House on a 305 to 112 vote in 1987. In 1990, a similar bill passed the House on a vote of 334 to 87 and the Senate on a vote of 67 to 30. President George H. W. Bush vetoed the legislation, which the House voted to override 327 to 93 and the Senate sustained on a vote of 65 to 35, with 55 Democrats and 10 Republicans voting to override and 35 Republicans supporting the president's veto.

In 1993 the advocates for removing or modifying restrictions on the political activities of federal employees succeeded in enacting the Hatch Act Reform Amendments of 1993 (107 Stat. 1001) that removed the prohibition on participation in "political management or political campaigns". Federal employees are still forbidden to use their authority to affect the results of an election. They are also forbidden to run for office in a partisan election, to solicit or receive political contributions, and to engage in political activities while on duty or on federal property.

President Barack Obama signed the Hatch Act Modernization Act of 2012 on December 28, 2012. It modified penalties under the Hatch Act to allow for disciplinary actions in addition to removal for federal employees; clarified the applicability to the District of Columbia of provisions that cover state and local governments; limited the prohibition on state and local employees running for elective office to employees whose salary is paid completely by federal loans or grants.

== Applicability to U.S. uniformed service personnel ==
The Hatch Act does not apply to military members of the uniformed services of the United States, although it does apply to Department of Defense civil servants, as well as Department of Homeland Security civil servants in direct support of the United States Coast Guard. Members of the U.S. Armed Forces are subject to Department of Defense Directive 1344.10 (DoDD 1344.10), Political Activities by Members of the Armed Forces, and the spirit and intent of that directive is effectively the same as that of the Hatch Act for Federal civil servants. By agreement between the Secretary of Defense and the Secretary of Homeland Security, DoDD 1344.10 also applies to uniformed personnel of the Coast Guard at all times, whether it is operating as a service in the Department of Homeland Security or as part of the Navy under the Department of Defense. As a directive, DoDD 1344.10 is considered to be in the same category as an order or regulation, and military personnel violating its provisions can be considered in violation of Article 92 (Failure to obey order or regulation) of the Uniform Code of Military Justice.

Members of the United States Public Health Service Commissioned Corps are subject to specific Health and Human Service regulations found in Title 44, Code of Federal Regulations Part 73 Subpart F. Hatch Act guidelines for NOAA Corps Officers are provided by United States Department of Commerce, Office of the General Counsel, Ethics Law and Program Division. Career members of the Senior Executive Service, administrative law judges, and National Oceanic and Atmospheric Administration Corps officers are all subject to Hatch Act restrictions and have additional limitations on their off-duty political activities.

== Recent Hatch Act incidents ==
=== Bush administration ===
- In 2006, the Utah Democratic Party challenged the candidacy of Ogden City Police Chief Jon Greiner for State Senate. The challenge was upheld by the United States Office of Special Counsel (OSC) because the year prior the Ogden City Police Department received a federal grant to help pay for bulletproof vests. Jon Greiner appealed the decision, remained on the ballot, won the election and served one term (2006–2010) as Utah State Senator while the results of the appeal were unknown.
- In January 2007, the OSC announced the results of investigations into whether certain events during the election campaigns of 2004 and 2006 violated the Hatch Act.
  - It found no violation when Kennedy Space Center officials allowed Senator John Kerry's presidential campaign to use a NASA facility for a 2004 campaign event, because no government employees worked at the facility in question. It found streaming the event to NASA employees and contractors violated the Hatch Act.
  - It reviewed a 2006 speech by NASA Administrator Michael D. Griffin in which he appeared to endorse Representative Tom DeLay for re-election. It determined that he "should have exercised better judgment" and took no further action.
- In June 2007, the OSC found that Lurita Alexis Doan, Administrator of the General Services Administration, violated the Hatch Act when she took part in a video conference with Karl Rove and other White House officials, and sent letters asking how to help Republican politicians get elected.
- In December 2007, Vigo County Superior Court Judge David Bolk ruled that the mayor-elect of Terre Haute (Indiana) Duke Bennett was covered by the Hatch Act when he was candidate for mayor because he had been director of operations for the Hamilton Center (a medical facility) when he ran for mayor, and the Hamilton Center was receiving federal funding for its Head Start program. Nevertheless, Bennett was allowed to take office, because Judge Bolk ruled that the legal challenge had been brought too late to prevent this. In November 2008 "Indiana Court of Appeals in a 2–1 decision found that the Hatch Act did apply to Bennett and called for a special election to fill the office of Terre Haute mayor." In June 2009, Indiana Supreme Court ruled that Bennett could remain in office because the challenge had been brought by Bennett's opponent after the election, and therefore Bennett was no longer a candidate, but mayor-elect at the time and was no longer in violation of the act.
- On May 6, 2008, FBI agents raided OSC offices and the home office of its director, Scott Bloch. The raids related to an investigation into allegations that Bloch's office had attempted to obstruct justice by hiring an outside company to delete computer files beyond recovery in order to prevent authorities from proving Bloch had violated the Hatch Act by retaliating against whistle-blowers in his office, an independent U.S. government agency "charged with protecting the rights of government whistle-blowers".

=== Obama administration ===
- On September 13, 2012, the OSC charged Health and Human Services Secretary Kathleen Sebelius with violating the Hatch Act by making a political speech during an official government event. Sebelius later said she had made a mistake and that the error was "technical" in nature.
- On July 18, 2016, the OSC concluded that Housing and Urban Development Secretary Julian Castro violated the Hatch Act during an interview with Katie Couric. Castro admitted the violation, but denied any intent to violate the act.
- On October 30, 2016, U.S. Senate Democratic Minority Leader Harry Reid stated that FBI Director James Comey may have violated the Hatch Act by sending a letter to the Congress on October 28, 2016, which stated that the FBI would be reopening its investigation of the Hillary Clinton email controversy. Also on October 30, Richard Painter, a chief White House ethics lawyer for the George W. Bush administration, published an op-ed saying that he had filed a complaint against the FBI with the OSC and with the Office of Government Ethics about the same matter.
- In November 2016, two San Francisco Bay Area federal employees who were elected to school boards were told that they would have to resign their federal positions in order to serve on the boards, as their running for a non-partisan seat that had party political involvement contravened the Hatch Act. Both Jerrold Parsons, President of the John Swett Unified School District, and Mary Ann Nihart, Vice Mayor of Pacifica, chose not to serve in order to retain their federal jobs.

=== First Trump administration ===
- In June 2017, the OSC issued a warning to White House Deputy Chief of Staff for Communications Dan Scavino Jr. for an April 2017 tweet that Scavino sent advocating for a primary challenge against U.S. Representative Justin Amash.
- In October 2017, the OSC issued a warning to Nikki Haley, United States Ambassador to the United Nations, over a June 2017 tweet that she retweeted from President Donald Trump endorsing Republican Congressional candidate Ralph Norman.
- In November 2017, former Office of Government Ethics head Walter Shaub filed a complaint against White House counselor Kellyanne Conway charging that her opposition to Roy Moore opponent Doug Jones during a segment on Fox and Friends violated the Hatch Act. In March 2018, the OSC announced that Conway violated the Hatch Act on that occasion and one other.
- In February 2018, FCC Commissioner Michael O'Rielly, in a speech at the Conservative Political Action Conference, "advocated for the reelection of President Trump in his official capacity as FCC Commissioner".
- In September 2018, the OSC issued a warning letter to Stephanie Grisham, the Press Secretary and Communications Director for the First Lady of the United States, for violating the act by including Trump's campaign slogan in a post on her government Twitter account.
- In November 2018, the OSC ruled that six Trump administration officials violated the Hatch Act in posts to their government Twitter accounts, but declined to take disciplinary action. The OSC warned the officials—Raj Shah, deputy press secretary; Jessica Ditto, deputy director of communications; Madeleine Westerhout, executive assistant to the president; Helen Aguirre Ferré, former director of media affairs; Alyssa Farah, press secretary for the vice president; and Jacob Wood, deputy communications director of the Office of Management and Budget—that future infractions would be interpreted as willful violations subject to further action.
- In June 2019, the OSC sent a letter to President Trump recommending that White House counselor Kellyanne Conway be removed from federal service for repeatedly violating the Hatch Act. This report followed the March 2018 OSC finding that Conway was a "repeat offender" for disparaging Democratic presidential candidates while in her official capacity during televised interviews and on social media. President Trump, when asked at a press conference, stated he thought the provision violated her free speech rights.
- In August 2020, Department of Agriculture secretary Sonny Perdue supported the president's re-election while promoting the Farmers to Families Food Box Program; Perdue was fined for violating the Hatch Act.
- In August 2020, President Trump announced that, as a result of the COVID-19 pandemic in the United States, and the move of the 2020 Republican National Convention to a largely online format, he would make his speech accepting the Republican Party nomination for the presidential election from the South Lawn of the White House. In response, the OSC sent a letter to President Trump indicating that, while both the President and Vice President are not covered by the terms of the Hatch Act, White House staffers are, and would therefore not be able to assist with such an address. Moreover, other portions of the Convention included clips recorded at the White House, including an interview with freed hostages, and a naturalization ceremony. While Republicans argued that the South Lawn forms part of the President's residence, and therefore should not be classed as part of a federal building, legal experts pointed out that "[i]t's still illegal under the Hatch Act for any White House staffer to participate in executing a campaign photo op/video segment in the White House".
- As of mid-October 2020, 14 members of the Trump administration had been accused by Citizens for Responsibility and Ethics in Washington of Hatch Act violations to promote the incumbent's re-election. By the beginning of November it was up to 16. Senator Elizabeth Warren's staff released a report in which they "counted more than 54 violations of the Hatch Act by 14 administration officials dating back to 2017, as well as nearly 100 additional pending investigations for alleged violations by 22 officials".
- On November 5, 2020, the United States Office of Special Counsel opened an investigation into the campaign's use of the White House for campaign purposes. In January 2021, emails from before the election were reported to feature a "top" Interior department official instructing staff to reference the president's account in each post on social media.

=== Biden administration ===
- In March 2021, Housing and Urban Development Secretary Marcia Fudge violated the Hatch Act by signaling support for Democratic candidates for the upcoming 2022 Ohio Senate election. Secretary Fudge received a warning from the Office of Special Counsel for the comments, which said, "If in the future she engages in prohibited political activity we will consider such activity to be a willful and knowing violation of the law that could result in further action."
- In October 2021, Jen Psaki, the White House Press Secretary, was alleged to have violated the Hatch Act by the watchdog Citizens for Responsibility and Ethics in Washington after she indicated that President Joe Biden supported the candidacy of Democrat Terry McAuliffe in the 2021 Virginia gubernatorial election. The watchdog had previously warned, in a letter to the Biden Administration, that Psaki's statement of support in February 2021 for Gavin Newsom, the Governor of California, in the 2021 California gubernatorial recall election, while not a Hatch Act violation since the election was not yet certain to occur, was "closer than necessary to the situations the Hatch Act does contemplate".
- In March 2022, President Biden fired Herschel Walker and Mehmet Oz from their positions on the President's Council on Sports, Fitness, and Nutrition due to the two being active United States Senate candidates for the Republican Party. The terminations were a result of potential Hatch Act violations, as well as a Biden administration policy against allowing federal candidates to serve on presidential boards.
- In October 2022, the Office of Special Counsel found that Ron Klain had violated the Hatch Act and was warned not to do so again. On January 21, 2023, it was reported that Klain would resign as chief of staff in the period following the 2023 State of the Union Address on February 7.
- In November 2022, White House press secretary Karine Jean-Pierre repeatedly used the phrase "MAGA Republicans" during White House press briefings, which the Office of Special Counsel determined was a violation the Hatch Act. The OSC issued a warning letter and did not pursue any disciplinary action.
- In July 2023, in response to the 2023 White House cocaine incident during which cocaine was discovered at an entrance area used by visitors, White House staffer Andrew Bates cited the Hatch Act to justify not responding to a question as to whether or not the cocaine belonged to either President Biden or his son, Hunter Biden.
- In September 2024, the OSC found United States Secretary of the Navy Carlos Del Toro violated the Hatch Act after investigating a letter dated February 1, 2024, in which the Secretary self-reported statements he made about presidential candidates during an official appearance on BBC News' Sunday with Laura Kuenssberg aired on January 28, 2024. The OSC also learned that Secretary Del Toro engaged in similar conduct at a separate Q&A session at the Royal United Services Institute that he attended in his official capacity hours before his BBC News Sunday interview.
- In September 2024, Neera Tanden was under investigation for Hatch Act violations for her tweets advocating for partisan political contributions.

=== Second Trump administration ===
- In October 2025, complaints were filed alleging Hatch Act violations after partisan statements blaming Democrats for a government shutdown were posted on the official Department of Housing and Urban Development (HUD) website. The statements, attributed to White House spokesperson Davis Ingle and HUD spokespersons, including Kasey Lovett, accused Democrats of pursuing a "$1.5 trillion wish list" and referred to them as the "Radical Left". Critics argued that using an agency website for partisan attacks constituted improper political activity. Partisan messaging also appeared on the websites of the Department of State, Small Business Administration, Department of Justice, and Department of Agriculture websites, which an interviewed by Politico said "push[ed] the boundaries" of the Hatch Act. An expert interviewed by the Associated Press said the language did violate the act. In a lawsuit raised by the union representing employees of the Department of Education, judge Christopher Cooper of the United States District Court for the District of Columbia found that the changing of automatic reply email replies of furloughed employees to blame the Democrats for the shutdown violated the employees' First Amendment rights in a November 2025 ruling.
- In October 2025, ethics observers raised concerns that White House press secretary Karoline Leavitt's voicemail on the official White House comment line, which blamed Democrats for the federal government shutdown, violated the Hatch Act. The message claimed Democrats prioritized "funding healthcare for illegal immigrants" over serving the American people.
- According to confidential sources of the Washington Post, Robert F. Kennedy, Jr., used a military jet in August 2026 to fly from the Washington, D.C., area to Des Moines, Iowa, to appear in campaign events of Republican Party candidates in the gubernatorial race and a House of Representatives election race.
- After Katie Zacharia delivered her first briefing as White House Press Secretary on October 13, 2026, multiple media outlets such as MS NOW, LBC, and The Advocate suggested she may have breached the Hatch Act by endorsing the Republican campaign in the 2026 United States elections with phrases such as "President Trump delivered another blockbuster rally" and "hard-working Americans are lining up and packing arenas to support President Trump and Republicans".

=== Agencies and employees prohibited from engaging in partisan political activity ===
Employees of the following agencies (or agency components), or in the following categories, are subject to more extensive restrictions on their political activities than employees in other departments and agencies.

- Administrative law judges (positions described at 5 U.S.C. § 5372)
- Census Bureau
- Central Intelligence Agency
- Contract Appeals Boards (positions described at 5 U.S.C. § 5372a)
- Criminal Division (Department of Justice)
- Defense Intelligence Agency
- Election Assistance Commission
- Federal Bureau of Investigation
- Federal Election Commission
- Merit Systems Protection Board
- National Geospatial-Intelligence Agency
- National Security Agency
- National Security Council
- National Security Division (Department of Justice)
- Office of Criminal Investigation (Internal Revenue Service)
- Office of the Director of National Intelligence
- Office of Investigative Programs (United States Customs Service)
- Office of Law Enforcement (Bureau of Alcohol, Tobacco, Firearms and Explosives)
- Office of Special Counsel
- Secret Service
- Senior Executive Service
- Employees employed under Sections 3132(a)(4), 5372, 5372(a), or 5372(b) of Title 5 of the United States Code

Additionally one of the early consequences of the act were disparate court rulings in union busting cases which forbade the use of voter information from initiative and recall petitions for any purposes outside the intended elections.

== Current restrictions ==
Permitted and prohibited activities for federal employees
Activity	Regular federal employees	Restricted federal employees
Active in partisan political management	Permitted	Prohibited
Assist in voter registration drives	Permitted	Non-partisan only
Attend political rallies, meetings, and fundraisers	Permitted	
Be candidates in non-partisan elections	Permitted	
Be candidates in partisan elections (Note: Federal employees are allowed to be independent candidates in partisan elections for offices of certain localities in the Washington metropolitan area and certain other localities where most voters are federal employees.)	Prohibited	
Campaign for or against candidates	Permitted	Prohibited
Campaign for or against referendum questions, constitutional amendments, or municipal ordinances	Permitted	
Circulate nominating petitions	Permitted	Prohibited
Contribute money to partisan groups and candidates in partisan elections	Permitted	
Distribute campaign literature to include via email or social media	Permitted	Prohibited
Engage in political activity while on duty	Prohibited	
Express opinions about partisan groups and candidates in partisan elections while not at work or using official authority	Permitted	
Express opinions about political issues	Permitted	
Invite subordinate employees to political events or otherwise suggest that they engage in political activity	Prohibited	
Join partisan groups	Permitted	
Make campaign speeches for candidates in partisan elections	Permitted	Prohibited
Participate in campaigns	Permitted	Only if candidates do not represent a political party
Register and vote as they choose	Permitted	
Sign nominating petitions	Permitted	
Solicit or discourage the political activity of any person with business before the agency (Note: Allowed if both persons are members of the same federal labor or employee organization, the person solicited is not a subordinate employee, the solicitation is for a contribution to the organization's political action committee, and the solicitation does not occur while on duty or in the workplace)	Prohibited	
Solicit, accept, or receive political contributions (including hosting or inviting others to political fundraisers)	Prohibited	
Use official authority to interfere with an election or while engaged in political activity	Prohibited	

=== Permitted candidacies ===
Federal employees are allowed to be candidates in non-partisan elections, meaning where no candidates are identified by political party. This type of election is used by most municipalities and school boards in the United States.

They are also allowed to be independent candidates in partisan elections for offices of certain localities in the Washington metropolitan area and certain other localities where most voters are federal employees, as designated by the Office of Personnel Management:

- District of Columbia
- In Maryland: Anne Arundel, Calvert, Frederick, Howard, Montgomery, Prince George's and St. Mary's counties; and municipalities of Annapolis, Berwyn Heights, Bethesda, (Note: Unincorporated area, no elected offices of its own.) Bladensburg, Bowie, Brentwood, Capitol Heights, Cheverly, Chevy Chase, (Note: Listed as "Chevy Chase, section 4", its former name.) Chevy Chase Section Three, Chevy Chase View, Chevy Chase Village, College Park, Cottage City, District Heights, Edmonston, Fairmount Heights, (Note: Listed as "Fairmont Heights".) Forest Heights, Garrett Park, Glen Echo, Glenarden, Greenbelt, Hyattsville, Kensington, Landover Hills, Martin's Additions, Morningside, Mount Rainier, New Carrollton, North Beach, North Brentwood, North Chevy Chase, Northwest Park, Riverdale Park, (Note: Listed as "Riverdale", its former name.) Rockville, Seat Pleasant, Somerset, Takoma Park, University Park and Washington Grove
- In Virginia: Arlington, Fairfax, Fauquier, King George, Loudoun, Prince William, Spotsylvania and Stafford counties; cities of Alexandria, Fairfax, Falls Church, Manassas, Manassas Park and Portsmouth; and towns of Clifton, Herndon and Vienna
- Other municipalities: Anchorage, Alaska; Huachuca City and Sierra Vista, Arizona; Benicia, California; Centerville and Warner Robins, Georgia; Crane, Indiana; New Johnsonville and Norris, Tennessee; Elmer City, Bremerton and Port Orchard, Washington

== See also ==
- House Un-American Activities Committee – American investigative committee (1938–1975)
- Office of Personnel Management – United States federal government agency
- Smith Act – United States federal statute
