= Henry Kerner =

American lawyer (born 1966)

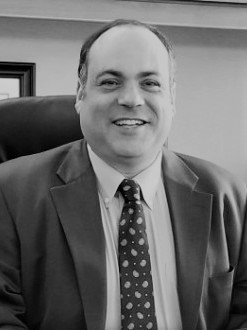
- Kerner in 2017

Member of the United States Merit Systems Protection Board
- Incumbent
- Assumed office June 3, 2024
- President: Joe Biden; Donald Trump
- Preceded by: Tristan Leavitt

Special Counsel of the United States
- In office October 30, 2017 – October 23, 2023
- President: Donald Trump; Joe Biden
- Preceded by: Carolyn N. Lerner
- Succeeded by: Hampton Dellinger

Personal details
- Born: Henry John Kerner; 1966 (age 59–60) New York City, U.S.
- Party: Republican
- Education: University of California, Los Angeles (BA, MA); Harvard University (JD)

Henry John Kerner (born 1966) is an American lawyer who served as the Special Counsel in the United States Office of Special Counsel from 2017 to 2023, and has served on the three-member Merit Systems Protection Board since 2024.

== Biography ==
Kerner was born in 1966 in New York City. He received a bachelor's degree and a master's degree in history from the University of California, Los Angeles, before obtaining his J.D. at Harvard Law School in 1992.

He spent 18 years as a prosecutor in California before becoming staff director for U.S. Senator John McCain at the United States Senate Homeland Security Permanent Subcommittee on Investigations. In 2011, Kerner joined the United States House Committee on Oversight and Government Reform, working for Chairman Darrell Issa and Chairman Jason Chaffetz.

Kerner went on to become Assistant Vice President for Investigations at the small-government advocacy organization Cause of Action Institute. In June 2017, President Donald Trump nominated Kerner to become Special Counsel at the United States Office of Special Counsel. He was confirmed by the 115th Congress with final voting from the U.S. Senate in October 2017.

President Joe Biden announced his intention to nominate Kerner as a Republican member of the Merit Systems Protection Board on July 3, 2023, and his nomination expired on January 3, 2024. He was renominated on January 8, 2024, and his nomination was confirmed by voice vote by the Senate on May 14, 2024.
