= Colleen Kiko =

American lawyer (born 1950)

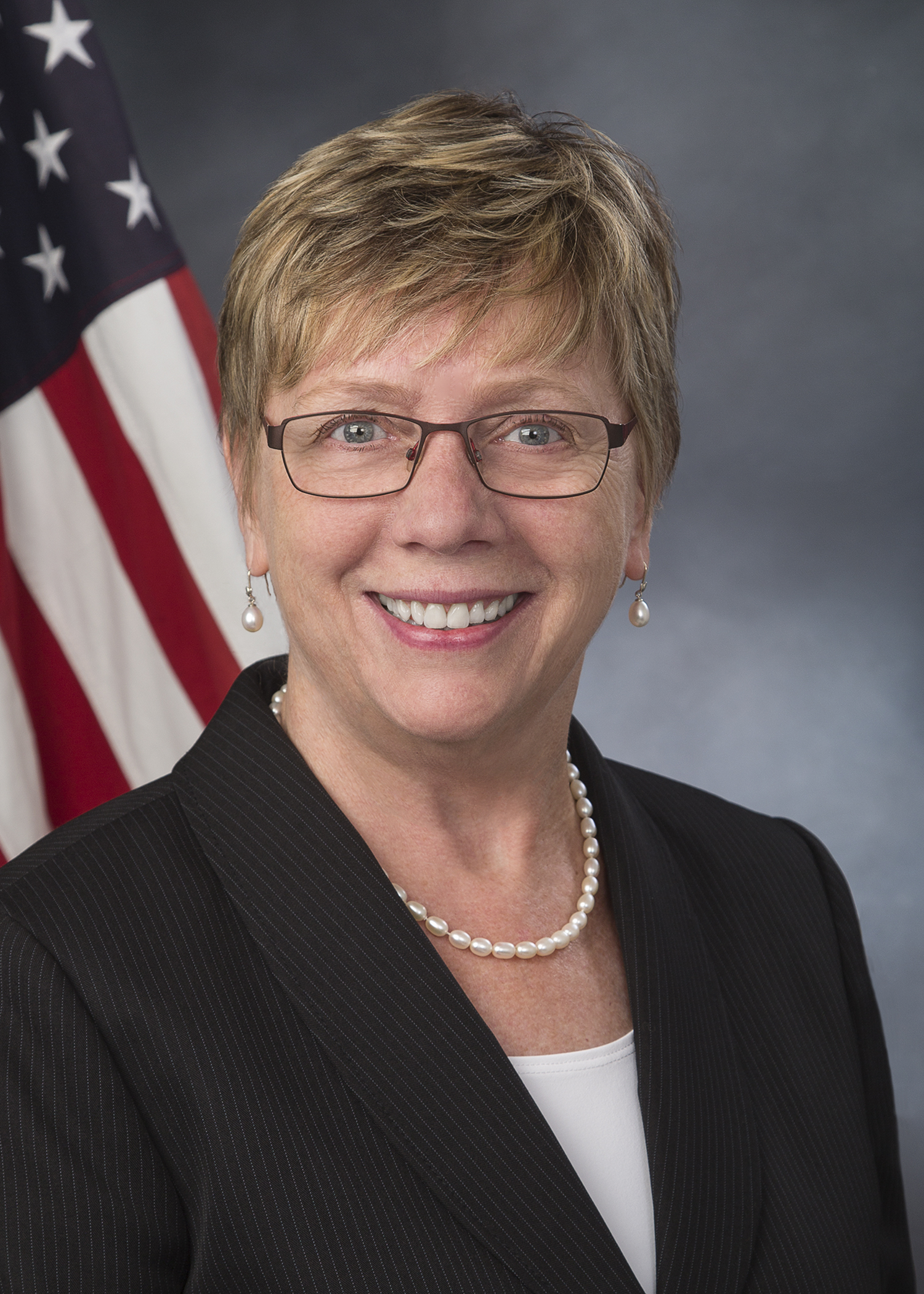
- Official portrait, 2018

Chair of the Federal Labor Relations Authority
- Incumbent
- Assumed office February 11, 2025
- President: Donald Trump
- Preceded by: Susan Tsui Grundmann
- In office December 11, 2017 – January 21, 2021
- President: Donald Trump; Joe Biden
- Preceded by: Patrick Pizzella (acting)
- Succeeded by: Ernest W. DuBester

Member of the Federal Labor Relations Authority
- Incumbent
- Assumed office December 11, 2017
- President: Donald Trump; Joe Biden; Donald Trump
- Preceded by: Ernest W. DuBester

Personal details
- Born: Colleen Margaret Duffy; October 15, 1950 (age 75) Pembina, North Dakota, U.S.
- Party: Republican
- Spouse: Philip Kiko
- Children: 4
- Education: North Dakota State University (BA); Liberty University (JD)

Colleen Margaret Duffy Kiko (née Duffy; born October 15, 1950) is an American attorney and government official serving as Chair of the Federal Labor Relations Authority (FLRA). Prior to assuming her current role, she was a Judge of the Employees' Compensation Appeals Board in the United States Department of Labor. Kiko worked in the predecessor agency to the FLRA and first joined the newly created agency in 1979 in order to investigate unfair labor practices. In 2005, she became general counsel of the FLRA. Kiko has also held various roles in the United States Department of Justice, served as an associate counsel to the United States House Committee on the Judiciary, and engaged in the private practice of law.
