= United States Merit Systems Protection Board =

Independent quasi-judicial agency

Merit Systems Protection Board

Agency overview
- Formed: January 1, 1979
- Preceding agency: United States Civil Service Commission
- Jurisdiction: Federal government of the United States
- Headquarters: Washington, D.C.
- Agency executive: James Woodruff II, Chair
- Website: www.mspb.gov

The Merit Systems Protection Board (MSPB) is an independent quasi-judicial agency established in 1979 to protect federal merit systems against partisan, political and other prohibited personnel practices and to ensure adequate protection for federal employees against abuses by agency management.

When an employee of most executive branch agencies is separated from their position or suspended for more than 14 days, they can request that MSPB conduct a hearing into the matter by submitting an appeal, generally within 30 days. In that hearing, the agency will have to prove that the action was warranted and the employee may present evidence that it was not. An MSPB decision is binding unless set aside on appeal to federal court. Along with the Office of Personnel Management and the Federal Labor Relations Authority, the MSPB is a successor agency of the United States Civil Service Commission.

The board had no quorum for the entire first Trump administration, with the last member retiring at the end of February 2019. A quorum resumed on March 4, 2022, upon the swearing in of Raymond Limon and Tristan Leavitt.

In 2025, the chair of the MSPB was fired by the second Trump administration, then sued and was reinstated by court order, then ordered the restoration of 5,600 employees fired during the 2025 United States federal mass layoffs. The reinstatement was stayed by an appeals court in March 2025.

== Function ==
Generally, appeals are heard by the United States Court of Appeals for the Federal Circuit, but appeals involving claims of discrimination are heard in federal district court.

The Board carries out its statutory mission by:

- Adjudicating employee appeals of personnel actions over which the Board has jurisdiction, such as removals, suspensions, furloughs, and demotions;
- Adjudicating appeals of administrative decisions affecting an individual's rights or benefits under the Civil Service Retirement System or the Federal Employees' Retirement System;
- Adjudicating employee complaints filed under the Whistleblower Protection Act, the Uniformed Services Employment and Reemployment Rights Act, and the Veterans Employment Opportunities Act;
- Adjudicating cases brought by the United States Office of Special Counsel (OSC), principally complaints of prohibited personnel practices and Hatch Act violations;
- Adjudicating requests to review regulations of the Office of Personnel Management that are alleged to require or result in the commission of a prohibited personnel practice—or reviewing such regulations on the Board's own motion;
- Ordering compliance with final Board orders where appropriate;
- Conducting studies of the Federal civil service and other merit systems in the Executive Branch to determine whether they are free from prohibited personnel practices.

=== Significant appeals ===
The largest settlement since the MSPB's inception was for $820,000 in Robert W. Whitmore v. Department of Labor. The Board approved the settlement on June 5, 2013. Whitmore was fired after giving Congressional testimony that the Occupational Safety and Health Administration's workplace injury and illness program was deliberately ineffective. He had worked for the Bureau of Labor Statistics for 37 years.

The largest settlement before Whitmore was for $755,000 to former Securities and Exchange Commission lawyer Gary J. Aguirre for his wrongful termination in 2005. The SEC settled Aguirre's claim on June 29, 2009.

In January 2011, the Board ordered the U.S. Park Police to reinstate its former chief, Teresa Chambers, who had been fired in 2004 for speaking to the Washington Post about the consequences of Park Police staff shortages. The Board also found her entitled to retroactive pay dating to 2004 and legal costs.

=== Merit Principles survey ===
The MSPB surveyed federal employees in 1992 and 2010. The response rate was 64 and 58 percent, netting approximately 13,000 and 42,000 responses in the 1992 and 2010 surveys, respectively. One question asked, "During the last 12 months, did you personally observe or obtain direct evidence of one or more illegal or wasteful activities involving your agency?" In 1992, 17.7% of respondents answered yes. In 2010, 11.1% of respondents answered yes.

In 1992, 53% of respondents who made a disclosure reported that they were identified as the source. In 2010, 43% reported that they were identified. In both 1992 and 2010, about one-third of those who felt they had been identified as a source of a report of wrongdoing also perceived either threats or acts of reprisal or both. To qualify for protection under the Whistleblower Protection Act, a person must be disclosing a violation of a law, rule, or regulation; gross mismanagement; a gross waste of funds; an abuse of authority; or a substantial and specific danger to public health or safety. Only certain official personnel actions are prohibited; other forms of retaliation remain permissible.

== Board members ==
The Board has three members, nominated by the President of the United States, with the advice and consent of the Senate, who serve seven-year terms. By statute (5 U.S.C. § 1201), "not more than 2 […] shall be adherents of the same political party". The chair of the board requires two separate Senate confirmations, one as a member of the board and one as chair. The president can designate a vice chair without Senate confirmation. The permitted reasons for removal of board members are "inefficiency, neglect of duty or malfeasance in office".

The members of the MSPB as of August 31, 2026 are:

Position	Name	Party	Sworn in	Term expires
Chair	James Woodruff II	Republican	October 28, 2025 (Member); August 21, 2026 (Chair)	March 1, 2032
Vice chair	Henry Kerner	Republican	June 3, 2024	March 1, 2030
Member	Vacant	—N/a	—	March 1, 2028

== History ==
The MSPB was established during President Jimmy Carter's administration as an independent agency by Reorganization Plan No. 2 of 1978 (43 FR 36037, 92 Stat. 3783), effective January 1, 1979, in accordance with Executive Order 12107 (44 FR 1055), December 28, 1978, and the Civil Service Reform Act of 1978 (92 Stat. 1111), October 13, 1978.

== Impacts from the second Trump administration ==
On the first day of his second term in January 2025, President Trump named a Republican as acting chair. In February 2025, Trump removed the chair of the board, Cathy Harris, a Democrat, who had served three years of her term, and demoted the other Democratic member. Harris then sued the Trump administration, alleging that her removal was illegal. On February 18, 2025, a U.S. District judge granted Harris's emergency motion and reinstated her temporarily. Then on March 4, 2025, the same judge, citing U.S. Supreme Court cases from 1933 and 1953, entered a permanent injunction ordering that she be reinstated.

On March 5, 2025, Harris ordered the reinstatement of 5,600 employees of the US Department of Agriculture who had been fired during the Trump administration's 2025 United States federal mass layoffs.

On March 27, 2025, a three-judge panel of the United States Court of Appeals for the District of Columbia Circuit stayed the district court's injunction, with two judges finding that the Trump administration was likely to succeed on the appeal, and that the statutory restriction on the president dismissing members of the board was likely unconstitutional. This permitted Trump to dismiss Harris. On June 30, 2025, a Senate committee advanced James Woodruff, Trump's nomination to the MSPB board.

As of mid-2025, the MSPB faces a surge in appeals—nearly doubling from 2024 levels—due to increased federal workforce reductions from the Trump administration, while simultaneously experiencing its lowest staffing in years. As of May 2025, MSPB had received over 11,000 appeals, which is double the average amount they typically would receive a given year.

== Criticism ==
There are complaints that the MSPB has gone beyond protecting civil servants from unjustified disciplinary action. Rather, critics allege, the MSPB makes it difficult to fire poor performers or problematic employees even when they have committed violations that would result in termination in the private sector. According to the CEO of the Partnership for Public Service, "There is no question that taxpayers are losing hundreds of millions of dollars, in a conservative estimate. They are losing more than that because they are losing the ability to get the very best out of government."

According to statistics the MSPB compiled, 15,925 appeals were filed with the MSPB in 2014. Of those, 5,283 were dismissed, 1,093 were settled, and 9,549 were adjudicated by way of initial decisions by MSPB administrative judges and administrative law judges. In those initial decisions, the MSPB affirmed the employing agency's decision 9,348 times (nearly 98% of the time), modified the employing agency's decision or mitigated the penalty imposed 21 times, and reversed the employing Agency's decision 169 times (less than 2% of the time). The presidentially appointed board members granted review of 170 initial decisions, remanding the case for further review in 112 cases, reversing MSPB administrative judges' and administrative law judges' initial decisions in 30 cases, affirming the initial decision in 18 cases, and taking another action in 10 cases.

From January 7, 2017, to March 3, 2022, the MSPB lacked a quorum consisting of two members. It is the longest the agency has been without a quorum in its history. Without a quorum, the "Board will be unable to issue decisions that require a majority vote". Effectively, this meant that no new substantive decisions were issued and the backlog of cases awaiting final disposition increased. As of March 2019, the last member's term had expired and the Senate had not acted on President Trump's nominations. With a vacant board, its general counsel becomes the acting executive and administrative officer, and administrative judges still hear cases and issue initial decisions.

On March 4, 2022, President Biden's nominees Vice Chair Raymond Limon and Member Tristan Leavitt were sworn in to the MSPB, leading to the restoration of a quorum.

== See also ==
- Title 5 of the Code of Federal Regulations
- Douglas Factors
- Whistleblower Protection Act
