= Douglas v. Veterans Administration =

Curtis Douglas vs. Veterans Administration (5 Merit Systems Protection Board (MSPB), 313 (1981) was a case decided by the Merit Systems Protection Board which established criteria that supervisors must consider in determining an appropriate penalty to impose for an act of federal employee misconduct.

== The case ==
The original case decided by the MSPB involved seven employees and four different United States Government employers.

All seven employees were terminated by their respective employers for "job-related misconduct under 5 U.S.C. 7513". All seven employees appealed to the MSPB on the grounds that the punishment was too severe.

Initially, the MSPB's presiding officials sided with the employers on the grounds that selection of a penalty was a matter of agency discretion. However, the MSPB reopened the case, and requested comments via the Federal Register as to whether 1) the preponderance of the evidence standard was the appropriate standard to determine whether an agency-imposed sanction should be sustained, and 2) whether the MSPB had the authority to modify a punishment if it determined "the penalty does not promote the efficiency of the service".

In its opinion the MSPB made the following determinations:

1. In a jurisdictional matter, the MSPB ruled that, as the successor to the Civil Service Commission, it had the same authority to mitigate penalties as the Commission previously held.
2. The MSPB ruled that agencies had the burden of proof, by a preponderance of the evidence, that the punishment fit the circumstances. In doing so, the MSPB outlined a non-exhaustive list of factors, which may be aggravating and/or mitigating depending on the circumstances (commonly referred to as "Douglas factors", see below) that agencies were to consider.
3. The MSPB upheld the terminations for five of the seven employees.

=== The Douglas Factors ===
1. The nature and seriousness of the offense, and its relation to the employee's duties, position, and responsibilities, including whether the offense was intentional or technical or inadvertent, or was committed maliciously or for gain, or was frequently repeated;
2. the employee's job level and type of employment, including supervisory or fiduciary role, contacts with the public, and prominence of the position;
3. the employee's past disciplinary record;
4. the employee's past work record, including length of service, performance on the job, ability to get along with fellow workers, and dependability;
5. the effect of the offense upon the employee's ability to perform at a satisfactory level and its effect upon supervisors’ confidence in the employee's work ability to perform assigned duties;
6. consistency of the penalty with those imposed upon other employees for the same or similar offenses;
7. consistency of the penalty with any applicable agency table of penalties;
8. the notoriety of the offense or its impact upon the reputation of the agency;
9. the clarity with which the employee was on notice of any rules that were violated in committing the offense, or had been warned about the conduct in question;
10. the potential for the employee's rehabilitation;
11. mitigating circumstances surrounding the offense such as unusual job tensions, personality problems, mental impairment, harassment, or bad faith, malice or provocation on the part of others involved in the matter; and
12. the adequacy and effectiveness of alternative sanctions to deter such conduct in the future by the employee or others.

The Douglas factors are critical to a determination of the disciplinary penalty to be issued in a federal employee's case and are used to argue that disciplinary charges for federal employees, even if true, should still result in a lower penalty than the one proposed. Moreover, the MSPB has consistently held that when deciding officials fail to fully consider all the relevant Douglas Factors their penalty determination is not entitled to deference. Accordingly, the Douglas Factors are a critical point of analysis in any federal employee's discipline case, both for management and the employee.
