= Tristan Leavitt =

American attorney

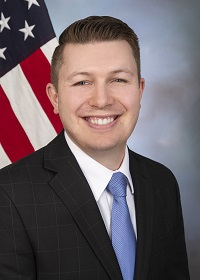

Member of the West Virginia House of Delegates from the 53rd district
- Incumbent
- Assumed office December 1, 2024
- Preceded by: Chris Pritt

Member of the United States Merit Systems Protection Board
- In office March 4, 2022 – February 28, 2023
- President: Joe Biden
- Preceded by: Susan Tsui Grundmann
- Succeeded by: Henry Kerner

Personal details
- Born: Idaho Falls, Idaho, U.S.
- Party: Republican
- Children: 5
- Education: Brigham Young University (BA); Georgetown University (JD)

Tristan Leavitt is an American attorney and politician who is the president of Empower Oversight as of March 2023. He is a Republican member of the West Virginia House of Delegates, representing District 53, Kanawha County. He formerly served in several roles at the Merit Systems Protection Board, including member, acting chair, and general counsel.

== Early life and education ==
Originally from Idaho Falls, Idaho, Leavitt earned a Bachelor of Arts degree in political science from Brigham Young University in 2007. At BYU, he was student body vice-president. He later earned a Juris Doctor degree from Georgetown University.

== Career ==
=== Early career ===
After graduating from BYU, Leavitt was hired as an intern in the office of Congressman Bill Sali, where he later was promoted to staff assistant. He then interned at Human Rights Without Frontiers before working on the staff of the United States House Committee on Oversight and Reform, the Senate Judiciary Committee, and as principal deputy special counsel and acting special counsel at the United States Office of Special Counsel.

=== Merit Systems Protection Board ===
In October 2018, Leavitt was appointed general counsel of the Merit Systems Protection Board. On February 28, 2019, the term of the only remaining member of the three-person MSPB expired, leaving the board with no members. Leavitt then assumed unitary control of the board's non-exclusive functions in accordance with continuity of government plans the board had enacted the last time it had members.

On September 2, 2021, President Joe Biden nominated Leavitt to serve as a member of the MSPB. Leavitt was confirmed on March 1, 2022 and took office three days later on March 4. He served until the expiration of his term on February 28, 2023.

At the time of Leavitt's departure, Acting Chair Cathy Harris evaluated Leavitt's time with the MSPB as "a really great asset to the board. He came with a lot of experience in whistleblower law. He also held down the fort during the lack of quorum".

=== Empower Oversight ===
In March 2023, Leavitt was hired as president of Empower Oversight, which describes itself as a "non-profit anti-corruption organization" and, according to the New York Times, is a "small group mostly composed of Republican lawyers with deep experience in Capitol Hill investigations" who spent years as aides to Senator Charles E. Grassley, the Republican senator from Iowa. Empower Oversight was founded on July 2, 2021. Clients represented by Empower Oversight include Federal Bureau of Investigation agents who raised concerns about the treatment of rioters who participated in the January 6 United States Capitol attack and Internal Revenue Service agents who alleged that President Biden's son, Hunter Biden, was receiving preferential treatment from federal prosecutors. Leavitt has worked closely with Kash Patel, a close associate of Donald Trump, who donated money to some of Leavitt's FBI clients.

=== 2023 West Virginia legislative election ===
In April 2023, Leavitt announced he intended to run for the West Virginia House of Delegates in the 53rd legislative district.

Leavitt won his bid for the West Virginia House of Delegates in 2024.

== Personal life ==
Leavitt is married and has five children. He met his wife while both were attending BYU.

In 2013, he served as president of the BYU Political Affairs Society, a networking group of BYU alumni sponsored by the BYU department of political science.
