= Hampton Dellinger =

American lawyer and politician (born 1967)

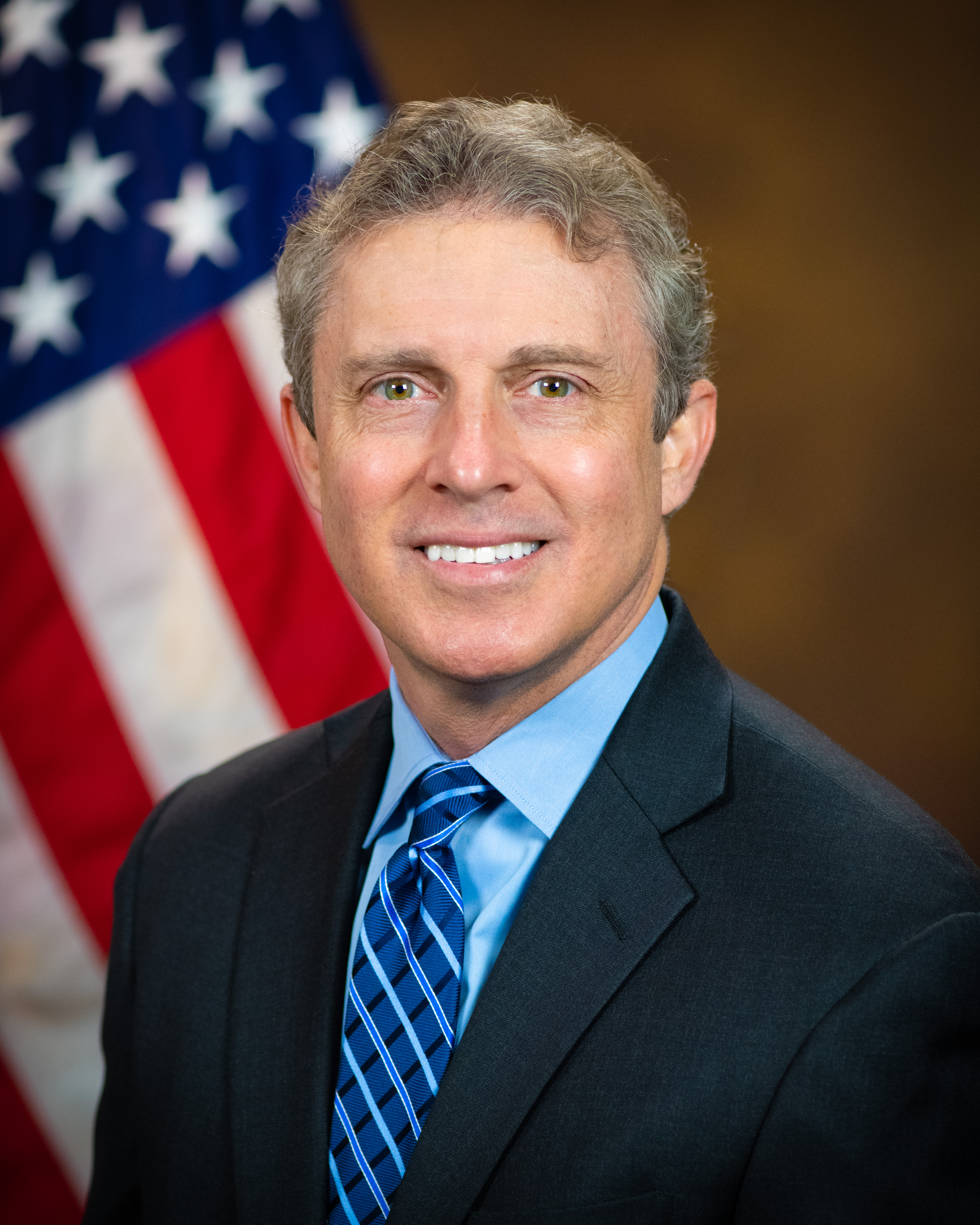
- Official portrait, 2022

Special Counsel of the United States
- In office March 6, 2024 – March 5, 2025 (Note: Dismissed by President Trump, February 7, 2025. Ordered reinstated by the United States District Court for the District of Columbia, February 10, 2025. District court order vacated, effecting Dellinger's dismissal, March 5, 2025.)
- President: Joe Biden; Donald Trump
- Preceded by: Henry Kerner
- Succeeded by: Charles Baldis

United States Assistant Attorney General for the Office of Legal Policy
- In office November 1, 2021 – June 15, 2023
- President: Joe Biden
- Preceded by: Beth Ann Williams
- Succeeded by: Aaron Reitz

Personal details
- Born: Hampton Yeats Dellinger; April 30, 1967 (age 59) Oxford, Mississippi, U.S.
- Party: Democratic
- Spouse: Jolynn Childers (m. 1994)
- Relations: Walter Dellinger (father)
- Education: University of Michigan (BA); Yale University (JD)

Hampton Yeats Dellinger (born April 30, 1967) is an American lawyer who served as Special Counsel of the U.S. Office of Special Counsel until fired by President Donald Trump. Initially dismissed on February 7, 2025, Dellinger sued to keep his job and gained rulings by a federal district court judge preventing his immediate dismissal. However, on March 5, 2025, the United States Court of Appeals for the District of Columbia Circuit lifted the injunction imposed by the district court, allowing his dismissal, and the next day Dellinger dropped the legal action to keep his job.

Dellinger previously served as the United States Assistant Attorney General for Legal Policy and had been a partner at Boies, Schiller & Flexner and at Robinson, Bradshaw, and Hinson.

== Education and early career ==
Dellinger's father, Walter E. Dellinger, served as the solicitor general for the United States from 1996 to 1997.

Dellinger earned a Bachelor of Arts degree from the University of Michigan and a Juris Doctor from Yale Law School. Dellinger clerked for Judge James Dickson Phillips Jr. of the United States Court of Appeals for the Fourth Circuit.

From January 2001 to June 2003, he served as legal counsel for North Carolina Governor Mike Easley. From July 2001 to June 2003, he also served as a member of the governor's advisory council on Hispanic-Latino affairs.

From July 2003 to January 2008, he was a partner with the firm Womble Carlyle. From 2008 to 2013, Dellinger was a lawyer in the office of Robinson, Bradshaw & Hinson. From 2013 to 2020, he was a partner at the Washington, D.C. office of Boies Schiller Flexner LLP. He practiced as a solo practitioner from 2020 to 2021.

He was a candidate for the 2008 Democratic nomination for lieutenant governor of North Carolina. In his first run for elective office, he lost the Democratic primary on May 6, 2008 to Walter Dalton.

In 2009, Senator Kay Hagan recommended Dellinger and two other lawyers to President Barack Obama for consideration as U.S. Attorney for the Eastern District of North Carolina. Obama eventually nominated attorney Thomas Walker.

== Federal government career ==
On June 18, 2021, he was nominated by President Biden to serve as the United States Department of Justice's Assistant Attorney General for the Office of Legal Policy. On July 28, 2021, a hearing on his nomination was held before the Senate Judiciary Committee. On September 23, 2021, his nomination was reported out of committee by a 13–8–1 vote. On October 27, 2021, the United States Senate invoked cloture on his nomination by a 51–45 vote. On October 28, 2021, Dellinger was confirmed by a 53–37 vote. He was sworn in on November 1, 2021.

On October 3, 2023, Dellinger was nominated to be the next Special Counsel of the United States. On November 30, 2023, a hearing on his nomination was held before the United States Senate Committee on Homeland Security and Governmental Affairs. On January 17, 2024, his nomination was reported out of committee by a 7–1 vote. On February 27, 2024, the United States Senate invoked cloture on his nomination by a 51–46 vote. He was confirmed later that day by a 49–47 vote. He was sworn in on March 6, 2024.

On February 7, 2025, President Donald Trump fired Dellinger, giving no reason for the removal. On February 10, Dellinger sued, alleging Trump had ignored a federal law that a special counsel can only be fired due to "inefficiency, neglect of duty, or malfeasance in office." Judge Amy Berman Jackson issued a temporary stay requiring Dellinger to be restored to office pending further legal action. On February 16, the Justice Department opened an emergency appeal with the Supreme Court seeking to lift the temporary order, arguing that it is an unacceptable intrusion on executive power. The Court agreed to hear the case on an emergency basis. Arguments on Bessent v. Dellinger began within days. On February 21, the Supreme Court declined to grant the emergency appeal in a 5-4 decision, holding the case in abeyance until February 26, when the temporary stay is set to expire.

On March 1, 2025, Judge Berman issued a ruling that Dellinger's firing was unlawful and that he was to be fully reinstated in his job. The Trump administration appealed the ruling. The United States Court of Appeals for the District of Columbia Circuit on March 5, 2025 lifted the stay imposed by the district court, allowing his dismissal. Dellinger then dropped his lawsuit, accepting his dismissal.

== Personal life ==
Dellinger is the son of the law professor and former acting Solicitor General of the United States, Walter E. Dellinger III. He married Jolynn Childers on September 10, 1994.
