= United States Office of Special Counsel =

Investigative and prosecutorial agency

- Official seal

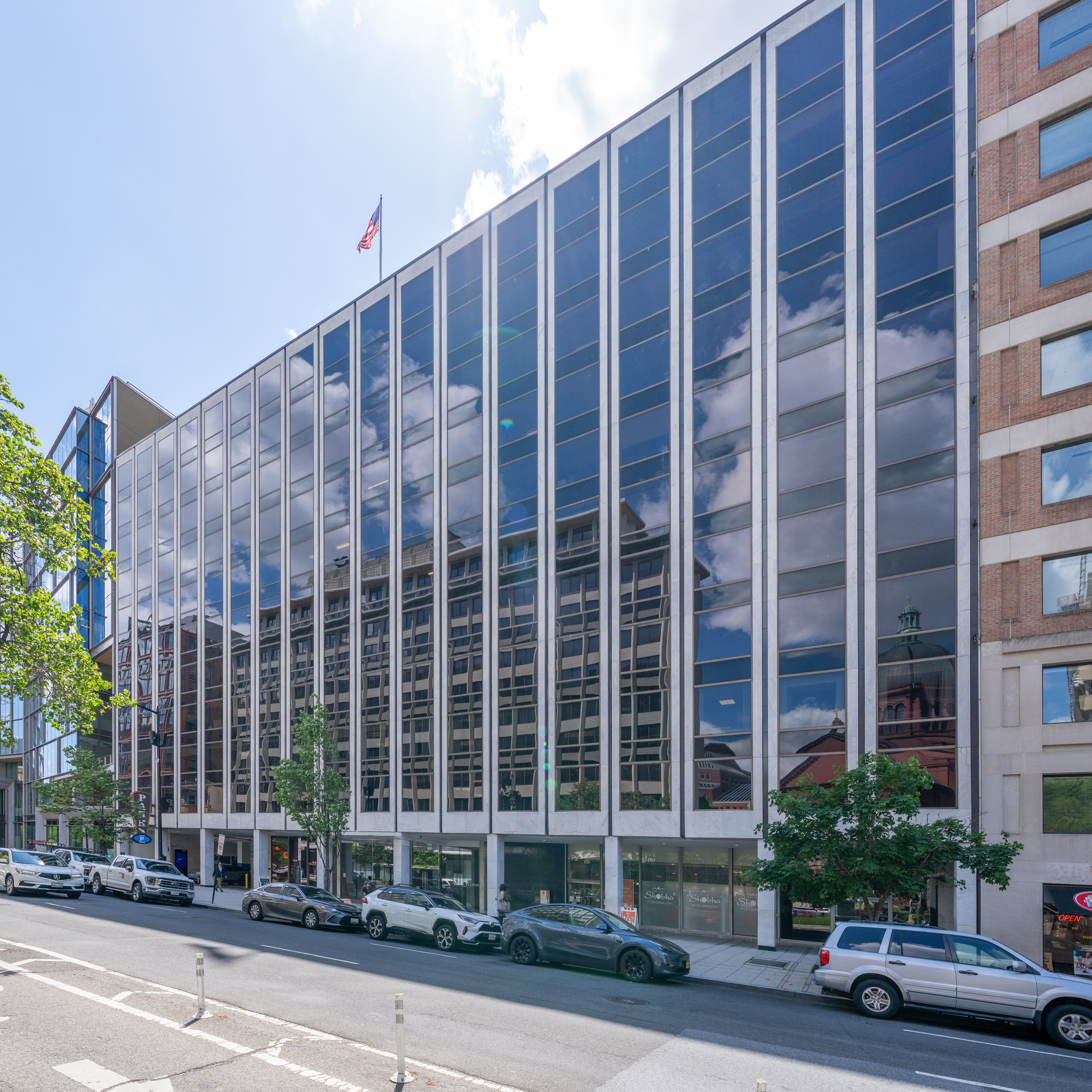
- Headquarters in Washington, D.C.

Agency overview
- Formed: January 1, 1979
- Jurisdiction: Federal government of the United States
- Headquarters: 1730 M Street, NW Washington, D.C.
- Employees: 123 FTE (FY 2025)
- Annual budget: $31.585 million (FY 2025)
- Agency executive: Charles Baldis, Special Counsel
- Website: osc.gov

The United States Office of Special Counsel (OSC) is an independent agency of the U.S. federal government. It is a permanent, investigative, and prosecutorial agency whose basic legislative authority comes from four federal statutes: the Civil Service Reform Act, the Whistleblower Protection Act, the Hatch Act, and the Uniformed Services Employment and Reemployment Rights Act (USERRA). OSC's primary mission is to safeguard the merit system in federal employment by protecting employees and applicants from prohibited personnel practices (PPPs), especially reprisal for "whistleblowing". The agency also operates a secure channel for federal whistleblower disclosures of violations of law, rule, or regulation; gross mismanagement; gross waste of funds; abuse of authority; and substantial and specific danger to public health and safety. In addition, OSC issues advice on the Hatch Act and enforces its restrictions on partisan political activity by government employees. Finally, OSC protects the civilian employment and reemployment rights of military service members under USERRA. OSC has around 140 staff, and the Special Counsel is an ex officio member of Council of Inspectors General on Integrity and Efficiency (CIGIE), an association of inspectors general charged with the regulation of good governance within the federal government.

== Jurisdiction ==
Pursuant to 5 U.S.C. § 1214, the U.S. Office of Special Counsel has jurisdiction over most prohibited personnel practice (PPP) complaints brought by executive branch employees, former employees, and applicants for employment (hereinafter simply "employee" or "employees"). When a PPP complaint is submitted, the agency examines the allegations. If OSC finds sufficient evidence of a violation, it may seek corrective action, disciplinary action, or both.

By statute, federal employees may not be retaliated against when they disclose information that they reasonably believe evidences the following types of wrongdoing: a violation of law, rule, or regulation; gross mismanagement; a gross waste of funds; an abuse of authority; or a substantial and specific danger to public health or safety. The Special Counsel is authorized to receive such disclosures of wrongdoing, but it lacks jurisdiction over PPPs committed against employees of the Central Intelligence Agency, Defense Intelligence Agency, National Security Agency, and certain other intelligence agencies found at 5 U.S.C. §2302(a)(2)(C)(ii), as well as the Government Accountability Office and any executive branch agencies principally concerned with counterintelligence or foreign intelligence, as designated by the president.

== Prohibited personnel practices ==
OSC's primary mission is to protect federal employees and others from "prohibited personnel practices". Those practices, defined by law at § 2302(b) of Title 5 of the United States Code (U.S.C.), generally stated, provide that a federal employee may not take, direct others to take, recommend or approve any personnel action that:

1. discriminate against an employee or applicant based on race, color, religion, sex, national origin, age, handicapping condition, marital status, or political affiliation;
2. solicit or consider employment recommendations based on factors other than personal knowledge or records of job-related abilities or characteristics;
3. coerce the political activity of any person;
4. deceive or willfully obstruct anyone from competing for employment;
5. influence anyone to withdraw from competition for any position so as to improve or injure the employment prospects of any other person;
6. give an unauthorized preference or advantage to anyone so as to improve or injure the employment prospects of any particular employee or applicant;
7. engage in nepotism (i.e., hire, promote, or advocate the hiring or promotion of relatives);
8. engage in reprisal for whistleblowing—i.e., take, fail to take, or threaten to take or fail to take a personnel action with respect to any employee or applicant because of any disclosure of information by the employee or applicant that he or she reasonably believes evidences a violation of a law, rule or regulation; gross mismanagement; gross waste of funds; an abuse of authority; or a substantial and specific danger to public health or safety (if such disclosure is not barred by law and such information is not specifically required by Executive Order to be kept secret in the interest of national defense or the conduct of foreign affairs—if so restricted by law or Executive Order, the disclosure is only protected if made to the Special Counsel, the Inspector General, or comparable agency official);
9. take, fail to take, or threaten to take or fail to take a personnel action against an employee for exercising an appeal, complaint, or grievance right; testifying for or assisting another in exercising such a right; cooperating with or disclosing information to the Special Counsel or to an Inspector General; or refusing to obey an order that would require the individual to violate a law, rule, or regulation;
10. discriminate based on personal conduct which is not adverse to the on-the-job performance of an employee, applicant, or others;
11. take or fail to take, recommend, or approve a personnel action if taking or failing to take such an action would violate a veterans' preference requirement;
12. take or fail to take a personnel action, if taking or failing to take action would violate any law, rule or regulation implementing or directly concerning merit system principles at 5 U.S.C. § 2301; or
13. implement or enforce a nondisclosure agreement or policy lacking notification of whistleblower rights.

== History ==
OSC was established on January 1, 1979. Until 1989, it operated as the independent investigative and prosecutorial arm of the Merit Systems Protection Board (MSPB), or "the Board". By law, OSC received and investigated complaints from employees alleging prohibited personnel practices by federal agencies; enforced the Hatch Act, including by providing advice on restrictions imposed by the act on political activity by covered federal, state, and local government employees; and received disclosures from federal employees about wrongdoing in government agencies. OSC enforced restrictions against prohibited personnel practices and unlawful political activity by filing, where appropriate, petitions for corrective and/or disciplinary action with the Board.

In 1989, Congress enacted the Whistleblower Protection Act (WPA). The statute made OSC an independent agency within the executive branch of the federal government, with continued responsibility for the functions described above. It also strengthened protections against reprisal for employees who disclose wrongdoing in the government and enhanced OSC's ability to enforce those protections.

In 1993, Congress enacted legislation that significantly amended Hatch Act provisions applicable to federal and District of Columbia government employees and enforced by OSC. (Provisions of the Act regarding certain state and local government employees were unaffected by the 1993 amendments.)

In 1994, USERRA became law. It defined employment-related rights of persons in connection with military service, prohibited discrimination against them because of that service, and gave OSC new authority to pursue remedies for violations by federal agencies.

Also in 1994, OSC's reauthorization act expanded protections for federal employees, and defined new responsibilities for OSC and other federal agencies. It provided, for example, that within 240 days of receiving a PPP complaint, OSC should determine whether there are reasonable grounds to believe that such a violation occurred, exists, or will be taken. The act extended the protections of certain legal provisions enforced by OSC to approximately 60,000 employees of what is now the Department of Veterans Affairs (DVA) and to employees of certain government corporations. It also broadened the scope of personnel actions covered under those provisions. Finally, the act made federal agencies responsible for informing their employees of available rights and remedies under the WPA, and directed agencies to consult with OSC in that process.

In November 2001, Congress enacted the Aviation and Transportation Security Act, creating the Transportation Security Administration (TSA). Under the Act, non-security screener employees of TSA can file allegations of reprisal for whistleblowing with OSC and the MSPB. But about 45,000 security screeners in TSA could not pursue such complaints at OSC or the Board. OSC efforts led to the signing of a memorandum of understanding (MOU) with TSA in May 2002, under which OSC reviews security screeners' whistleblower retaliation complaints, and recommends corrective or disciplinary action to TSA when warranted.

The Whistleblower Protection Enhancement Act of 2012 (WPEA) became law on November 27, 2012. The WPEA strengthens protections for federal whistleblowers by removing loopholes that deterred federal employees from disclosing waste, fraud, abuse, and mismanagement. It also removes restrictions that narrowed the scope of what constituted a "protected disclosure" under the Whistleblower Protection Act. In addition, it enhances OSC's ability to hold managers and supervisors accountable for retaliating against whistleblowers, and bolsters remedies available to federal whistleblowers who have been the victim of retaliation. Finally, it expands whistleblower reprisal protection to employees of the TSA.

On December 28, 2012, President Barack Obama signed the Hatch Act Modernization Act of 2012 into law. This update to the Hatch Act of 1939 allows most state and local government employees to run for partisan political office. The original Hatch Act prohibited many of them from running for partisan office. Under the new law, state and local government employees are no longer prohibited from running for partisan office unless their salary is paid for completely by federal loans or grants. As a result of the Hatch Act Modernization Act, many state and local government employees may participate more actively in their communities' governance.

=== 1970s and 1980s ===
According to congressional testimony by Tom Devine, legal director of the nonprofit Government Accountability Project:

The Watergate investigation of the 1970s revealed a Nixon administration operation to replace the non-partisan civil service system with a politically loyal workforce dedicated to partisan election goals. Every agency had a shadow "political hiring czar" whose operation trumped normal civil service authority of personnel offices. Then-White House Personnel Office chief Fred Malek teamed up with Alan May to prepare the "Malek Manual," a guide to exploiting loopholes in civil service laws to drive politically undesirable career employees out of government and replace them with applicants selected through a political rating system of 1–4, based on factors such as campaign contributions and future campaign value. The Watergate Committee's finding of the abuses led to creation of the Ink Commission, whose exhaustive study and recommendations were the foundation for the Civil Service Reform Act of 1978, including creation of the Office of Special Counsel to see that this type of merit system abuse never happened again.

Nevertheless, even with the strong impetus for its creation, the Office languished under President Jimmy Carter, with no permanent head, funding, or White House support.

Though not as productive as it could have been, as a young agency in 1979, the Office of Special Counsel filed two requests for corrective action with the Merit Systems Protection Board. In Frazier, four deputy U.S. Marshals were threatened with geographic reassignment for blowing the whistle and exercising their appeal rights. In Tariela and Meiselman, two high-level Department of Veterans Affairs employees were threatened with reassignment for disclosing violations of laws, rules, and regulations. In its first year, OSC also requested legislation to address many concerns, among them whether the Special Counsel has litigation authority in court, and it asked for administrative independence from the Merit Systems Protection Board, of which it was a part.

President Ronald Reagan appointed Alex Kozinski to head the OSC. Within 14 months of his appointment, 70% of attorneys and investigators at the office's headquarters were either fired or had resigned. Kozinski "kept a copy of the Malek Manual on his desk", according to Devine's testimony. Devine added:

He used its techniques to purge the professional civil service experts on his own staff, and replace them with employees who viewed whistleblowers as crazy troublemakers disloyal to the President. He taught courses to federal managers on how to fire whistleblowers without getting caught by OSC investigators, using the OSC Investigations Manual as a handout. He tutored Interior Secretary James Watt on how to remove a whistleblowing coal mine inspector from the Department of Interior. The OSC became what one Senate staffer called "a legalized plumbers unit."

Devine also testified:

Mr. Kozinski's abuses were the major catalyst for passage of the Whistleblower Protection Act of 1989, and he was forced to resign.

Under the WPA, the Office of Special Counsel became an independent agency.

=== 1990s and 2000s ===
In 1995, OSC received a complaint that a high-ranking employee had sexually harassed six subordinates. "The complaint alleged that the respondent engaged in repeated and varied unwelcome and offensive conduct over an approximate seven year period, including pressure and requests for dates and sexual favors, unwelcome sexual gestures and advances, and conditioning job offers on the granting of sexual favors." OSC settled the case with the victims and harasser, who was suspended for 60 days and permanently removed from a supervisory position.

A whistleblower from NASA disclosed to OSC that officials at the Lyndon B. Johnson Space Center (JSC) "created and were perpetrating a serious risk to public safety, such as the in-flight failure of a space shuttle, by ignoring their own specifications and safety margins for the effects of electromagnetic interference between and among systems within a given space shuttle." The whistleblower added that "for a period of ten years, from 1989 to 1999, NASA allowed shuttles to be sent into space when the EMI levels of the vehicles exceeded established safety margins". As a result of this disclosure, "NASA has stated that it will commit appropriate resources, including oversight and coordination, to improvements in the EMC program."

In 2002, OSC announced a program to help federal agency heads meet the statutory obligation to inform their employees about the rights, remedies, and responsibilities of the Whistleblower Protection Act under 5 U.S.C. § 2302(c). The certification program offered guidance and enumerated five steps required for meeting the statutory obligation.

In the early 2000s, during Elaine Kaplan's tenure as Special Counsel, the office received disclosures about a team of undercover security agents employed by the Federal Aviation Administration (FAA) that traveled to airports around the world to investigate airport security systems "in order to provide the FAA with realistic data on the state of aviation security". A former Special Agent with the FAA who conducted these investigations disclosed that the FAA "deliberately covered up … findings that reflected negatively on the airline industry."

From 2005 to 2007, OSC under Special Counsel Scott Bloch received disclosures about air traffic control problems at Dallas Fort Worth International Airport. According to an OSC press release, air traffic controllers alleged that there was "a management cover-up of air traffic control operational errors" in the "safe separation between aircraft under their control".

In 2006, OSC announced that it had won reemployment and back pay for an injured Iraq war veteran who "sustained serious injuries in the line of fire". According to an OSC press release, "When honorably discharged from military service, his injuries prevented Harris [the veteran] from returning to the job he held for ten years as a Postal Carrier at a U.S. Post Office in Mobile, Alabama. Rather than looking for an alternate position for him, though, the postmaster sent Harris a letter saying that there was no work available for him", in violation of USERRA.

OSC attracted public attention in 2007 when it began an investigation of alleged White House political pressure on federal civil servants. Senior political adviser Karl Rove was reported to be a subject of the investigation.

==== Scott J. Bloch ====
On June 26, 2003, President George W. Bush nominated Scott J. Bloch as Special Counsel at OSC; the Senate confirmed him on December 9 and he was sworn in on January 5, 2004. Bloch was a lightning rod for controversy. His first major actions were to choose as deputy a lawyer who had publicly taken a position against the "homosexual agenda" and to hire young lawyers from Ave Maria School of Law, the conservative school founded by Domino's Pizza billionaire Tom Monaghan.

On May 6, 2008, the Federal Bureau of Investigation served warrants on OSC headquarters in Washington, D.C. and Bloch's home, seizing computers. It was alleged that when Bloch's refusal to follow up on cases of discrimination based on sexual orientation was leaked to the press, he retaliated against career employees by creating a field office in Detroit. He was removed as Special Counsel on October 23, 2008, and was later found to have obstructed the investigation by removing material from his computer. He pleaded guilty to criminal contempt of Congress but then successfully withdrew his plea upon learning that he would be sentenced to prison.

During the Bloch era, the OSC was criticized for very rarely recognizing legitimate whistleblowers, typically only when the whistleblower had already prevailed elsewhere; taking too long to investigate meritorious cases; using a conservative litmus test in hiring; discouraging federal whistleblowers from using their legal protections; and generally siding with the Bush administration instead of with whistleblowers.

On March 22, 2007, U.S. Senator Daniel Akaka, chairman of the Subcommittee on Oversight of Government Management, the Federal Workforce, and the District of Columbia, held a hearing on "Safeguarding the Merit System Principles". In his opening statement, Akaka said, "organizations that help whistleblowers claim that OSC has gone from being their first option for relief to their last choice since OSC no longer works with agencies to achieve informal relief and the percentage of corrective actions and stays has been cut in half since 2002."

=== 2010s ===
After Bloch's tenure, OSC's website was modified to make it clear that it views sexual orientation and gender discrimination as prohibited personnel practices: "OSC has jurisdiction over allegations of discrimination based on conduct that does not affect job performance, which includes sexual orientation discrimination. In certain cases, EEOC may also have jurisdiction over claims of sexual orientation discrimination, such as a claim of sexual stereotyping, i.e., discrimination for failing to conform to a gender stereotype."

After becoming Special Counsel, Carolyn Lerner received plaudits for intense activity, public response, and revitalizing the agency. She greatly expanded its Alternative Dispute Resolution Unit. In Fiscal Year 2011, successful mediations increased from 50% to 77%, and mediations that yielded settlements increased by nearly 3.5 times.

In 2011, OSC requested and obtained stays from the MSPB in three whistleblower retaliation cases—those of David Butterfield of the Department of Homeland Security, Franz Gayl of the U.S. Marine Corps, and Paul T. Hardy, a member of the U.S. Public Health Service. In October, on a matter related to Gayl's case, OSC filed an amicus brief with the MSPB arguing that the Board should afford employees who are suspended without pay greater due process protections because of the suspension of a security clearance. Also in October, Lerner called for reform of the Hatch Act, which OSC is charged with enforcing. Lerner sent draft legislation to Congress, proposing changes in the enforcement structure, an end to the prohibition on state and local candidacies linked to federal funding, and other changes. Congress largely accepted these changes in the form of the Hatch Act Modernization Act, which became law on January 28, 2013. It modified penalties under the Hatch Act to allow for disciplinary actions in addition to removal for federal employees and clarified the applicability to the District of Columbia of provisions that cover state and local governments. It also limited the prohibition on state and local employees running for elective office to employees whose salary is paid completely by federal loans or grants.

During this same period, the OSC released a report from its Disclosure Unit detailing the complaints of three U.S. Port Mortuary whistleblowers and the subsequent statutorily required investigation by their agency, the U.S. Air Force. The report, which included numerous accounts of the mishandling of remains of U.S. service members and their families, received considerable media and congressional attention. OSC subsequently reported to the Air Force that three mortuary supervisors had retaliated against the whistleblowers and should be disciplined.

OSC continues to receive numerous disclosures from FAA employees, including air traffic controllers, about safety concerns at U.S. airports. According to an OSC press release in 2012, the agency had received 178 disclosures from FAA whistleblowers since 2007, most about aviation safety. After investigating the whistleblowers' allegations, the Department of Transportation substantiated 89% of OSC's referrals. In 2012 alone, OSC received cases about air traffic controllers sleeping in control rooms, using cell phones, improperly overseeing airline inspection/maintenance programs, allowing unauthorized aircraft to fly in U.S. airspace, and allowing risky landing maneuvers.

In April 2011, OSC entered into a three-year "Demonstration Project" with the Department of Labor to enforce the Uniformed Services Employment and Reemployment Rights Act (USERRA), which, according to OSC, "prohibits employment discrimination against veterans and members of the National Guard and Reserve and entitles them to reinstatement in their civilian jobs upon their return from military duty." Under the Demonstration Project, OSC will "receive and investigate certain USERRA complaints involving federal agencies." In September 2012, at OSC's request, the MSPB granted a stay request for civilian Army employees who were subject to harassment after disclosing that their supervisor had violated law, rule, and regulation by "falsifying and destroying patient records".

2012 and 2013 also saw legislative success for OSC with the Whistleblower Protection Enhancement Act and Hatch Act Modernization Act.

A major set of cases OSC handled was about veterans' safety at VA hospitals, particularly in Jackson, Mississippi. According to a letter Lerner sent to President Obama, "These whistleblower disclosures are the latest, and most severe, in a persistent drumbeat of concerns raised by seven Jackson VAMC employees to OSC in the last four years. Throughout this process, the Department of Veterans Affairs (VA) has consistently failed to take responsibility for identified problems. Even in cases of substantiated misconduct, including acknowledged violations of state and federal law, the VA routinely suggests that the problems do not affect patient care." There have been cases of unauthorized and unlicensed VA employees writing prescriptions for narcotics and understaffing in primary care units. Whistleblowers have also alleged that "a radiologist failed to read thousands of images or misread them, leading to missed diagnoses. Medical records were falsified to cover up these errors. Management knew of these problems and did not notify patients or require a full review of the images in question."

According to a Washington Post article, as of May 2014, OSC had "63 open cases involving VA health, safety, or scheduling violations."

OSC has also received numerous disclosures from whistleblowers from the Department of Homeland Security about abuse of an overtime provision called "administratively uncontrollable overtime", according to The Washington Post and congressional hearings before the Senate Committee on Homeland Security & Governmental Affairs and the House Committee on Oversight and Government Reform.

In 2013, Obama's "Second Open Government National Action Plan for the United States of America" made certification in OSC's 2302(c) Certification Plan mandatory for all agencies.

A 2014 disclosure concerned wasteful Army contracts amounting to over $1 million. The Army substantiated the whistleblower's disclosures. According to an OSC press release, "The Army's Intelligence and Security Command at Fort Belvoir, Virginia, agreed to an $8 million annual contract with Silverback7, Inc. to hire and pay dozens of contract employees in various fields." These contracts duplicated existing ones, and there was insufficient oversight to ensure Silverback7 hired the employees after the Army paid for the contract. The Army's own report concluded that it violated the "Bona Fide Needs Rule, the Purpose Statute, and the Defense Federal Acquisition Regulations."

Also in 2014, OSC filed its first disciplinary action complaints related to political discrimination at the Merit Systems Protection Board in 30 years, aided by changes due to the Whistleblower Protection Enhancement Act. The three complaints were against Customs and Border Protection officials who were "alleged to have violated civil service laws" by "unlawfully manipulat[ing] the hiring process to select" candidates who had "close affiliation with the campaign to elect Barack Obama, the Obama Administration, and CBP's politically appointed commissioner." According to an OSC press release, "The complaints charge two of the three CBP officials with discriminating in favor of political appointees and against other potential candidates. They did so by improperly intervening in the hiring process to convert non-career political appointees into career appointments (known as 'political burrowing')."

In 2017 OSC warned President Donald Trump's social media director Dan Scavino for violating the Hatch Act with a political tweet. He was also told that any more breaches would be seen as intentional and punished more harshly. In 2018, OSC said that Trump counselor Kellyanne Conway violated the Hatch Act by making political remarks about the 2017 Alabama Senate election on two different occasions. In 2019, OSC recommended that she be removed from federal service for repeated Hatch Act violations.

=== 2020s ===
In 2024, President Joe Biden appointed Hampton Dellinger as head of the OSC. The Senate confirmed Dellinger.

On February 7, 2025, Dellinger received an email saying that President Trump had terminated him effective immediately. Dellinger sued, arguing that Trump acted beyond his legal authority by firing him before the end of his term and without citing problems with his performance. Dellinger's suit cited §1211 of Title 5 of the United States Code, which states that the Special Counsel may be removed by the president "only for inefficiency, neglect of duty, or malfeasance in office". On February 10, a judge at the Federal District Court in Washington issued an order briefly reinstating Dellinger. On February 16, the Justice Department opened an emergency appeal with the Supreme Court seeking to lift the temporary order, arguing that it is an unacceptable intrusion on executive power, after the D.C. Circuit Court of Appeals refused to halt the order. The Supreme Court on June 29, 2026 issued a 6–3 decision in Trump v. Slaughter along the Court's ideological lines that the president had the power to remove independent agency heads at will, overturning the 90 year old precedent of Humphrey's Executor. This decision validated the termination of Dellinger, and changed 5 U.S.C. § 1211 to remove insulating protections passed by Congress to promote the political independence of the Office of Special Counsel. Dellinger, himself has now publicly advocated for the dissolution the office which he once lead, claiming it has lost the independence that is critical to its basic functions.

== List of acting and confirmed United States Special Counsels ==
- Charles Baldis, (September 30, 2026 – present)
- Jamieson Greer, Acting (April 1, 2025 – September 30, 2026)
- Doug Collins, Acting (March 5, 2025 – April 1, 2025)
- Hampton Dellinger (March 6, 2024 – March 5, 2025)
- Karen Gorman, Acting (October 23, 2023 – March 6, 2024)
- Henry Kerner (October 30, 2017 – October 23, 2023) Confirmed by the 115th United States Senate (voice vote) on October 16, 2017. He graduated from Harvard Law School and spent 18 years working as a career prosecutor in California. In 2011, he joined the staff of the House Committee on Oversight and Government Reform, the chief investigative committee of the United States House of Representatives. Kerner was also the staff director under Ranking Member Sen. John McCain of the Senate Permanent Subcommittee on Investigations, the lead investigative committee of the Senate. He left in early 2016 and joined Cause of Action Institute as vice president for Investigations. The group is a nonpartisan oversight foundation committed to exposing waste, fraud and abuse in the federal government, which itself has worked with whistleblower and government groups throughout the country.
- Tristan L. Leavitt, Acting (September – October 30, 2017)
- Adam Miles, Acting (June – September 2017)
- Carolyn N. Lerner (April 2011 – June 2017) – The United States Senate confirmed Carolyn Lerner as the 8th Special Counsel on April 14, 2011. Prior to her appointment as Special Counsel, Lerner was a partner in the Washington, D.C., civil rights and employment law firm Heller, Huron, Chertkof, Lerner, Simon & Salzman, where she represented individuals in discrimination and employment matters, as well as non-profit organizations on a wide variety of issues. She previously served as the federal court appointed monitor of the consent decree in Neal v. D.C. Department of Corrections, a sexual harassment and retaliation class action. Before becoming Special Counsel, Lerner taught mediation as an adjunct professor at George Washington University Law School, and was mediator for the United States District Court for the District of Columbia and the D.C. Office of Human Rights. When she was in private practice, Lerner was featured in Best Lawyers in America, with a specialty of civil rights law, and was one of Washingtonian magazine's top employment lawyers. Lerner earned her undergraduate degree from the honors program at the University of Michigan with high distinction and was selected to be a Truman Scholar. She received a diploma in general studies from the London School of Economics, and she earned her Juris Doctor degree from New York University (NYU) School of Law, where she was a Root-Tilden-Snow public interest scholar. After law school, she served for two years as a law clerk to the Honorable Julian Abele Cook, Jr., Chief U.S. District Court Judge for the Eastern District of Michigan.
- William E. Reukauf, Acting (November 2008 – April 2011). Reukauf joined the legal staff of the U.S. Office of Special Counsel (OSC) in January 1983. He was appointed Associate Special Counsel for Prosecution in February 1985. In 2001 he became the head of an Investigation and Prosecution division. Prior to taking over as Acting Special Counsel, he had responsibility for managing the activities of the agency's regional field offices, as well as responsibility for OSC's Alternative Dispute Resolution Program. Prior to joining OSC, Mr. Reukauf was, for several years, in private practice in Washington, DC. His practice was focused on general civil litigation and criminal defense. Reukauf began his legal career in 1970, as an Assistant United States Attorney for the District of Columbia. In 1973 he joined the General Counsel's office of the U.S. Environmental Protection Agency, as a senior trial attorney where he prosecuted enforcement actions involving toxic chemicals in the Division of Pesticides & Toxic Substances. Mr. Reukauf received his undergraduate degree from Hamilton College in 1966 and his Juris Doctor degree from Georgetown University Law Center in 1969. He is the author of Regulation of Toxic Pesticides, 62 Iowa L. Rev. 909 (1976–1977).
- Scott J. Bloch (December 2003 – November 2008). On June 26, 2003, President George W. Bush nominated Bloch for the position of Special Counsel at the Office of Special Counsel. The Senate unanimously confirmed Bloch on December 9, 2003. On Jan. 5, 2004, he was sworn in to serve a five-year term. Bloch brought 17 years of experience to the Office of Special Counsel, including litigation of employment, lawyer ethics, and complex cases before state courts, federal courts and administrative tribunals. He briefed and argued cases before state and federal appellate courts. From 2001 to 2003, Bloch served as associate director and then deputy director and Counsel to the Task Force for Faith-based and Community Initiatives at the U.S. Department of Justice, where he worked on First Amendment cases, regulations, intergovernmental outreach, and programmatic initiatives. Before serving in the Justice Department, he was a partner with Stevens & Brand, LLP, of Lawrence, Kansas, where he practiced in the areas of civil rights law, employment law, and legal ethics. Bloch tried jury trials before state and federal courts, representing employees and employers in cases involving whistleblower and other retaliation claims, as well as civil rights claims. He worked on important cases that set precedents in the field of legal ethics, including a ground-breaking Texas case that changed the way plaintiffs' lawyers handle mass tort cases. Bloch served as chair of his county Bar Ethics and Grievance Committee, investigating cases of alleged breaches by attorneys of ethics rules, and making recommendations to the state Supreme Court on disciplinary action. He also served on the state board of discipline, hearing testimony and legal arguments, and making findings on appropriate discipline of attorneys. For five years, he served as an adjunct professor at the University of Kansas School of Law. Mr. Bloch earned his bachelor's and Juris Doctor degrees from the University of Kansas, where he graduated Order of the Coif, and served on the Boards of Editors of The Kansas Law Review and The Kansas Criminal Procedure Review. He lives with his wife, Catherine, and their seven children in Alexandria, Virginia.
- Elaine D. Kaplan (April 1998 – June 2003). Kaplan came to OSC with extensive experience litigating employment-related issues before federal courts and administrative tribunals. Prior to her appointment as Special Counsel by President Bill Clinton, Kaplan served as Deputy General Counsel of the National Treasury Employees Union (NTEU), where she represented the interests of 150,000 employees in the areas of civil liberties, administrative law, racial and sexual discrimination, and labor law. During her 13 years at NTEU, Kaplan briefed and argued dozens of cases at all levels of the federal courts on behalf of the union and the federal employees it represented. Many of the cases in which Kaplan participated resulted in important precedent-setting decisions including, among others, National Treasury Employees Union v. Von Raab, 489 U.S. 656 (1989) (the first Supreme Court decision addressing Fourth Amendment implications of urinalysis drug-testing in the public workforce) and National Treasury Employees Union v. United States, 115 S.Ct. 1003 (1995) (which struck down on First Amendment grounds the statutory "honoraria ban" as applied to federal employees). Kaplan began her legal career in 1979 at the U.S. Department of Labor, Office of the Solicitor, where she worked as a staff attorney in the Division of Employee Benefits. In 1982, Kaplan was selected to serve on the staff of the newly created Division of Special Appellate and Supreme Court Litigation, which was established to handle the department's most significant appellate cases and all of its Supreme Court work. She subsequently held the position of staff attorney at the State and Local Legal Center, where she drafted amicus briefs on behalf of state and local governments for submission to the United States Supreme Court. Kaplan, who is a native of Brooklyn, New York, received her undergraduate degree from Binghamton University and her Juris Doctor degree from the Georgetown University Law Center.
- William E. Reukauf, Acting (~1997 – April 1998)
- Kathleen Day Koch (December 1991 – ~1997). Prior to appointment by President George Herbert Walker Bush, Koch previously held the position of General Counsel of the Federal Labor Relations Authority from December 1988 to December 1991. In her term as General Counsel, she encouraged a heightened emphasis on conflict resolution through cooperation and dispute avoidance. She has been instrumental in creating a conflict resolution seminar program that has been utilitized by various federal agencies nationwide. Koch's entire legal career has been in public service, where she has developed expertise in federal employee and government ethics issues. Prior to her appointment to the FLRA, she served as Associate Counsel to the President. She was asked to join the White House staff while serving as Senior Attorney in the Personnel Law Division at the Commerce Department. During the significant formative period of the Merits Systems Protection Board (1979–84), Koch participated in the development of the adjudicatory agency's procedural and substantive precedents. Her government career began in 1977 when she was appointed an Honors Program attorney at the Department of Housing and Urban Development. A native of St. Louis, Missouri, Koch studied at Concordia College in Riverside, Illinois. She received her B.S. degree with honors from the University of Missouri at St. Louis in 1971, and was honored that year as a finalist in the Danforth Urban Leadership Fellow competition. Koch took her J.D. degree from the University of Chicago Law School, graduating in 1977.
- Mary F. Weiseman (September 1986 – 1991). The third Special Counsel appointed by Ronald Reagan, Weiseman formerly served as Inspector General of the Small Business Administration. As Special Counsel, Wiseman focused on enforcement of the Hatch Act, which was then under review for statutory change, weakening its provisions. Wiseman's goal was to vindicate the rights of government employees to be free from direct and indirect pressure by their supervisors to engage in partisan politics both on and off the job.
- Lynn R. Collins, Acting (June 1986 – September 1986). Collins had been the Deputy Special Counsel; in the next decade he served as Special Assistant to the Regional Solicitor, U.S. Department of Interior, Sacramento, California.
- K. William O'Connor (October 1982 – June 1986). The second Special Counsel appointed by President Ronald Reagan, O'Conner formerly served as Inspector General of the Community Services Administration. Prior to 1981, O'Connor had served as Special Counsel for Interagency Coordination and Staff Director of the Executive Group Staff. His duties included advising the Deputy Attorney General on policy, programs, and matters affecting the Executive Group. In 1978–80 he was Senior Trial Attorney (Prosecutor/GSA Task Force) and led teams of investigators and lawyers in grand jury investigations of fraud schemes at the General Services Administration. In 1976–78 he was Associate Justice and then Chief Justice, High Court of American Samoa. O'Connor was vice president and counsel, Association of Motion Picture and Television Producers, Inc., in 1975–76; Special Counsel, Intelligence Coordination, Department of Justice, in 1975; Deputy Assistant Attorney General, Civil Rights Division, in 1971–75; Chief, Criminal Section, Civil Rights Division, in 1970–71; assistant to the Assistant Attorney General, Civil Rights Division, in 1967–70. Previously he held various positions with the Job Corps. O'Connor was graduated from the University of Virginia (B.A., 1952; LL.B., 1958). He served in the U.S. Marine Corps and was discharged in 1955 as first lieutenant.
- Alex Kozinski (June 1981 – August 1982). The first Special Counsel appointed by President Reagan, Kozinski formerly served as an attorney with the Office of Counsel to the President; previously practiced with Covington & Burling in Washington, D.C.
- Mary Eastwood, Acting (January 1980 – June 1981). A native of Wisconsin, Eastwood was graduated from the University of Wisconsin Law School in 1955 and moved to Washington, D.C., where she worked on a temporary study project for the National Academy of Sciences. She joined the Justice Department's Office of Legal Counsel in 1960, serving both as an attorney advisor and later (1969–79) as an equal opportunity advisor. The following year Eastwood became the associate special counsel for investigation in the special counsel's office of the Merit System Protection Board, which was charged with looking into allegations of illegal personnel practices in the federal government. As technical secretary to the civil and political rights committee of President Kennedy's Commission on the Status of Women (PCSW), Eastwood researched decisions involving women and the Fourteenth Amendment, and became increasingly interested in the women's movement. With Pauli Murray she wrote the highly influential article "Jane Crow and the Law: Sex Discrimination and Title VII," which appeared in the Georgetown Law Review (34, December 1965). She was very active in the formation of the National Organization for Women (NOW); a board member of Human Rights for Women (HRW), an organization formed in 1968 to help finance sex discrimination litigation and research projects on women's issues; and a member of Federally Employed Women (FEW), a group that sought an end to sex discrimination in the federal government.
- H. Patrick Swygert (January 1979 – December 1979). Swygert was a recess appointment by President Jimmy Carter, under an Administration whose support for the mission of Office of Special Counsel has been critiqued as lacking.

== See also ==
- Title 5 of the Code of Federal Regulations
