= Scott Bloch =

American lawyer

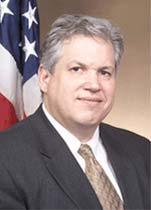
- Born: New York City, New York
- Education: University of Kansas School of Law
- Spouse: Catherine Bloch
- Children: Seven children
- Parent: Walter Black
- Website: Official website

Scott Bloch (born c. 1959) is an American attorney and former political appointee of President George W. Bush. Bloch served as United States Special Counsel from December 12, 2003, when Bush signed his appointment, filling out his five-year statutory term on December 11, 2008.

== Biography ==
Bloch was born in New York City and grew up in Los Angeles, where his father, who used the name Walter Black, was a writer for a number of popular television shows. His grandfather was the painter, Albert Bloch.

Scott Bloch worked as an associate and then partner for Stevens & Brand, LLP of Lawrence, Kansas between 1989 and 2001. Beginning in 2001, Bloch worked as a political appointee in the Bush administration, first as deputy director to the Department of Justice's Task Force for Faith-based and Community Initiatives between 2001 and 2003, and then as Special Counsel, directing the Office of Special Counsel, which has jurisdiction to protect whistleblowers and enforce the Hatch Act (which restricts political activities of government employees). Bloch is a grandson of American modernist artist Albert Bloch, about whom he filmed a documentary in 2002. Bloch also served on the Founders' Committee of Wyoming Catholic College from 2002 to 2005, and is a member of the Knights of Malta and a local society of admirers of Hilaire Belloc.

== Career ==
=== Alleged refusal to investigate complaints ===
Media sources, Congress, and gay rights organizations continued to criticize Special Counsel Bloch and the OSC's lack of enforcement of its policies, particularly in regards to dismissing gay discrimination complaints. For example, Michael Levine, a 65-year-old and openly gay radio technician, claimed that, after he blew the whistle on a coworker's and his supervisor's workplace misconduct, a personnel officer engaged in retaliatory action against him: pursuing knowingly false allegations of child pornography against Levine, suspending Levine for 14 days, seizing his computer, and referring to gay people as "those fucking faggots". One year after filing both a retaliation and antigay discrimination complaint with the OSC, Levine received a letter from the OSC on December 28, 2004. Without interviewing even a single witness, the OSC wrote that it was unable to investigate the complaints because only conduct, not sexual orientation, was protected under the Civil Service Act of 1978—a reversal of Bloch's April 8, 2004 statement that sexual orientation-based discrimination was prohibited due to imputed conduct and therefore that the OSC has the authority to pursue such complaints.

After being embroiled in a related "internal purge" controversy (see below), Special Counsel Bloch testified before a Senate panel on May 24, 2005 and reiterated his original position that he lacked the authority to protect federal employees on the basis of sexual orientation. The next day, the Log Cabin Republicans called on Bloch to resign.

=== Reorganization or internal purge ===
In January 2005, Bloch was accused of conducting a political purge of OSC employees by three government watchdog groups (the Government Accountability Project, the Project on Government Oversight, and Public Employees for Environmental Responsibility), two federal trade unions (the American Federation of Government Employees and the National Treasury Employees Union), an LGBT rights organization (the Human Rights Campaign), and the OSC employees themselves. This prompted several government investigations concerning Bloch's performance as a public employee, including destruction of emails and lying to Congress about it.

In the end, ten of the twelve employees resigned. Meanwhile, according to complaints, at least one staffer who had been supportive of Bloch's interpretation was promoted.

In October 2005, the US Office of Personnel Management ordered an investigation of claims that Special Counsel Bloch retaliated against employees who disagreed with his policies. Ironically, the OSC would ordinarily oversee such whistleblower disputes. The probe is also investigating whether Bloch showed an antigay bias in refusing certain whistleblower and discrimination claims.

In February 2007, Bloch was again accused of unfair supervisor practices when several of his staffers complained they felt coerced into not cooperating with the OPM probe. Bloch's deputy issued a memo urging OSC employees to only meet with probe investigaters in a certain conference room and to report their interactions to their supervisors. Employees reported other attempts to obstruct the investigation including "suggestions that all witnesses interviewed ... provide Bloch with affidavits describing what they had been asked and how they responded."

=== Alleged improper deletion of emails on office computers ===
Bloch became most notorious for hiring "Geeks on Call", a private technological services company, to perform a "seven level wipe" of his home and office computers in 2007 after becoming involved in litigation with OSC subordinates who accused him of politically motivated harassment. This prompted several government investigations concerning Bloch's performance as a public employee, including destruction of emails and lying to Congress about it. Bloch pleaded guilty to criminal charges of contempt of Congress in 2010, but was allowed to withdraw that plea in 2011 after being sentenced by the U.S. Magistrate Judge to serve 30 days in jail in addition to other conditions, of which imprisonment (and public chastisement) his attorney, William M. Sullivan Jr. of Pillsbury Winthrop Shaw Pittman LLP and U.S. Department of Justice prosecutors had not expected. Bloch later pleaded guilty again in U.S. District Court, this time to the misdemeanor of destroying government property, and was sentenced in June 2013 to serve two years probation and a day in jail, as well as to pay a $5000 fine and devote 200 hours to community service. After the OSC settled with the disgruntled former employees concerning the 2006-2008 charges, the Inspector General of the Office of Personnel Management issued a report critical of Bloch's conduct in office.

It is alleged that Scott Bloch erased the files on his office personal computer in 2007, and that the FBI tried to determine whether the emails were deleted improperly. The inspector general of the Office of Personnel Management examined the case at the urging of the White House. The Wall Street Journal reported in November 2007 that Bloch called the tech support service Geeks on Call for help deleting computer files instead of using his agency's own in-house computer technicians. Bloch confirmed that he contacted Geeks on Call, but insisted that it was to remove a computer virus.

== FBI raid and resignation ==
On May 6, 2008, FBI agents raided Bloch's offices. NPR and the Wall Street Journal reported that the raids were in relation to an investigation into allegations of obstruction of justice by Bloch's office. The New York Times reported that the investigation concerned whether Bloch had hired an outside company to "scrub" computer files to prevent an inquiry into whether he had violated the Hatch Act by mixing politics with his job, which is to shield whistleblowers.

As part of an investigation into destruction of evidence, Bloch's person was searched and two portable memory devices were recovered.

On October 20, 2008, Bloch announced his intention to resign from his position as Special Counsel at the OSC on January 5, 2009. But his employment ended abruptly on October 23, during a meeting with White House officials. He was subsequently barred from entry to his office by the United States Federal Protective Service, which handles security at federal facilities.

== Criminal conviction and subsequent litigation ==
On April 27, 2010 Bloch pleaded guilty to misdemeanor criminal conviction for damage to property for, according to the U.S. Attorney, "willfully and unlawfully withholding pertinent information from a House committee investigating his decision to have several government computers wiped ...." Bloch was originally slated to be sentenced on July 20, 2010. However, the sentencing was postponed after watchdog groups objected to a plea deal which would likely have seen Bloch get only probation. Contempt of Congress carries a maximum sentence of six months in prison. On February 2, Magistrate Judge Deborah A. Robinson ruled that Bloch faced a mandatory sentence of at least one month in prison.

On June 24, 2013, U. S. District Judge Robert L. Wilkins sentenced Bloch to 2 years probation which was terminated 1 year early. As a condition of probation, Bloch had to do community service and spend a day in the county jail, he was also ordered to pay a $5000 fine and perform 200 hours of community service.

In 2010, after an investigation by the FBI into the "Geeks on Call" incident, Bloch pleaded guilty to the misdemeanor charge of destroying government property then was sentenced to one day in jail and two years' probation, which was terminated 1 year early.

Bloch later attempted to sue the Executive Office of the President for his removal from public office. The case was dismissed by U.S. District Judge Thomas Ellis III on February 9, 2016.
