= Federal Labor Relations Authority =

U.S. government agency

- FLRA

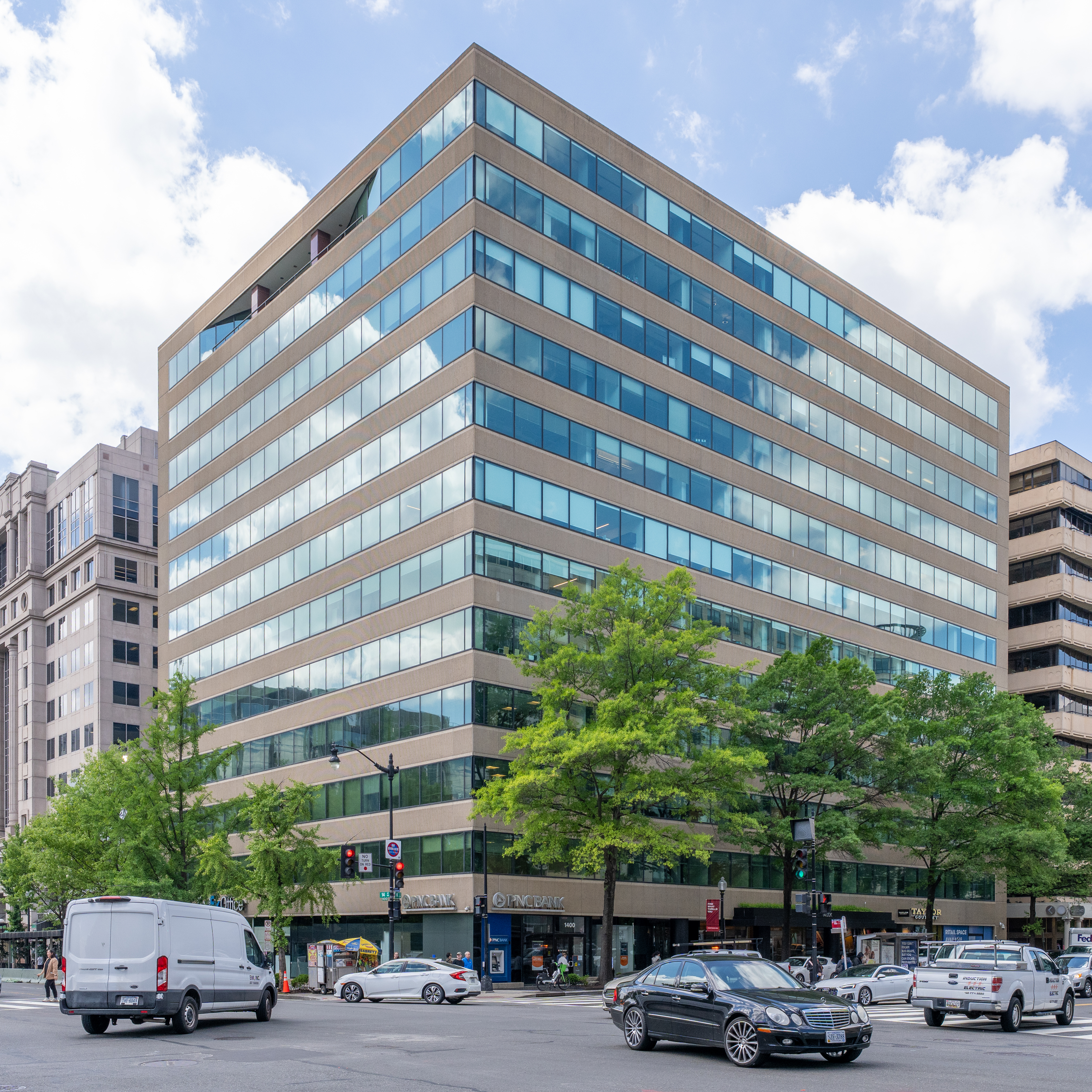
- Headquarters in Washington, D.C.

Agency overview
- Formed: 1978
- Jurisdiction: Federal government of the United States
- Headquarters: 1400 K Street, NW, Washington, D.C.
- Annual budget: $31.8 m USD (2022)
- Agency executives: Colleen Kiko, Chair; Charlton Allen, General Counsel
- Website: www.flra.gov

The Federal Labor Relations Authority (FLRA) is an independent agency of the United States government that governs labor relations between the federal government and its employees.

Created by the Civil Service Reform Act of 1978, it is a quasi-judicial body with three full-time members who are appointed for five-year terms by the president with the advice and consent of the Senate. One member is appointed by the President to serve as chairman, chief executive officer, and chief administrative officer of the FLRA. The chairman is also ex officio chairman of the Foreign Service Labor Relations Board. The three members cannot be from the same political party.

The Authority adjudicates disputes arising under the Civil Service Reform Act, deciding cases concerning the negotiability of collective bargaining agreement proposals, appeals concerning unfair labor practices and representation petitions, and exceptions to grievance arbitration awards. Consistent with its statutory charge to provide leadership in establishing policies and guidance to participants in the Federal labor-management relations program, the Authority also assists Federal agencies and unions in understanding their rights and responsibilities under the Statute through statutory training of parties.

In 1981, it decertified—that is, stripped it from its status as a representative union—the air traffic controllers' PATCO union, after the 1981 air traffic controllers strike.

The agency is separate from the National Labor Relations Board, which governs private-sector labor relations.

== Board members ==
The board is composed of three members, nominated by the president of the United States, with the advice and consent of the senate, for a term of five years. The president can designate the chairman with no separate senate confirmation required.

The current board members as of May 24, 2026:

Position	Name	Party	Sworn in	Term expires
Chair	Colleen Kiko	Republican	December 11, 2017	July 29, 2027
Member	Anne M. Wagner	Democratic	July 30, 2024	July 1, 2029
Member	Charles Arrington	Republican	January 6, 2026	July 1, 2030

The board is supported by a general counsel, who is also nominated by the President of the United States, with the advice and consent of the Senate, for a term of five years. There has been no senate-confirmed General Counsel since Julia Akins Clark left the post in January 2017, and no Acting General Counsel between November 2017 and March 24, 2021, when President Joe Biden named Charlotte A. Dye to be Acting General Counsel. In August 2021, President Biden nominated eight-year assistant general counsel Kurt Rumsfeld to the position. However, the nomination was pulled, and in June 2023, President Biden nominated union attorney Suzanne Summerlin for the position. Her nomination expired at the sine die adjournment of the 118th United States Congress. President Trump nominated Charlton Allen in September 2025, who was confirmed August 7, 2026.

== See also ==
- Title 5 of the Code of Federal Regulations
- Title 22 of the Code of Federal Regulations
- National Labor Relations Board
- Federal Mediation and Conciliation Service (United States)
- United States Merit Systems Protection Board
