= Title 42 appointment =

US federal civil service employment category

A Title 42 appointment is an excepted service employment category in the United States federal civil service. It allows scientists and special consultants to be hired as part of the Public Health Service or Environmental Protection Agency under a streamlined process "without regard to the civil-service laws". Courts have ruled that, although Title 42 appointments are exempt from hiring and compensation provisions of civil service laws, they are still entitled to protections relating to termination, including appeals to the Merit Systems Protection Board.

Title 42 hiring authority was first enacted in 1944 as part of the Public Health Service Act, and was extended to the Environmental Protection Agency on a limited basis in 2006. It is named after Title 42 of the United States Code, which contains its legal basis, and is contrasted with Title 5 employments which are normal civil service appointments.

== Legislative basis ==
Title 42 appointments are described in a part of the Public Health Service Act of 1944, which has been codified as 42 U.S.C. § 209. The original text reads:

(f) Special consultants. In accordance with regulations, special consultants may be employed to assist and advise in the operations of the Service. Such consultants may be appointed without regard to the civil-service laws and their compensation may be fixed without regard to the Classification Act of 1923, as amended.

(g) Designation for fellowships; duties; pay. In accordance with regulations, individual scientists, other than commissioned officers of the Service, may be designated by the Surgeon General to receive fellowships, appointed for duty with the Service without regard to the civil-service laws and compensated without regard to the Classification Act of 1923, as amended, may hold their fellowships under conditions prescribed therein, and may be assigned for studies or investigations either in this country or abroad during the terms of their fellowships.

The text about "compensation... without regard to the Classification Act of 1923, as amended" is present in the original law, but is omitted in the United States Code version as obsolete, although it is still legally binding.

In 2006, the District Court for the Northern District of West Virginia ruled in Afshari v. Leavitt that the text "appointed without regard to the civil-service laws" refers solely to flexibility from normal hiring formalities; protections given to excepted service positions under the Civil Service Reform Act, such as those relating to termination, still apply. In 2016, the Court of Appeals for the Federal Circuit similarly ruled in Lal v. Merit Systems Protection Board that the Civil Service Due Process Amendments of 1990 had extended Merit Systems Protection Board appeal rights to Title 42 appointees who had served for at least two years.

Regulations for special consultants are contained in 42 CFR 22.3, and those for fellowships are contained in 42 CFR 61.

== Characteristics ==
Title 42 appointments are intended to attract and retain scientific personnel by providing hiring flexibility and salaries that are competitive with the private sector. However, the authority has been criticized for being overused and for providing salaries that are greater than those allowed under the General Schedule.

=== Public Health Service ===
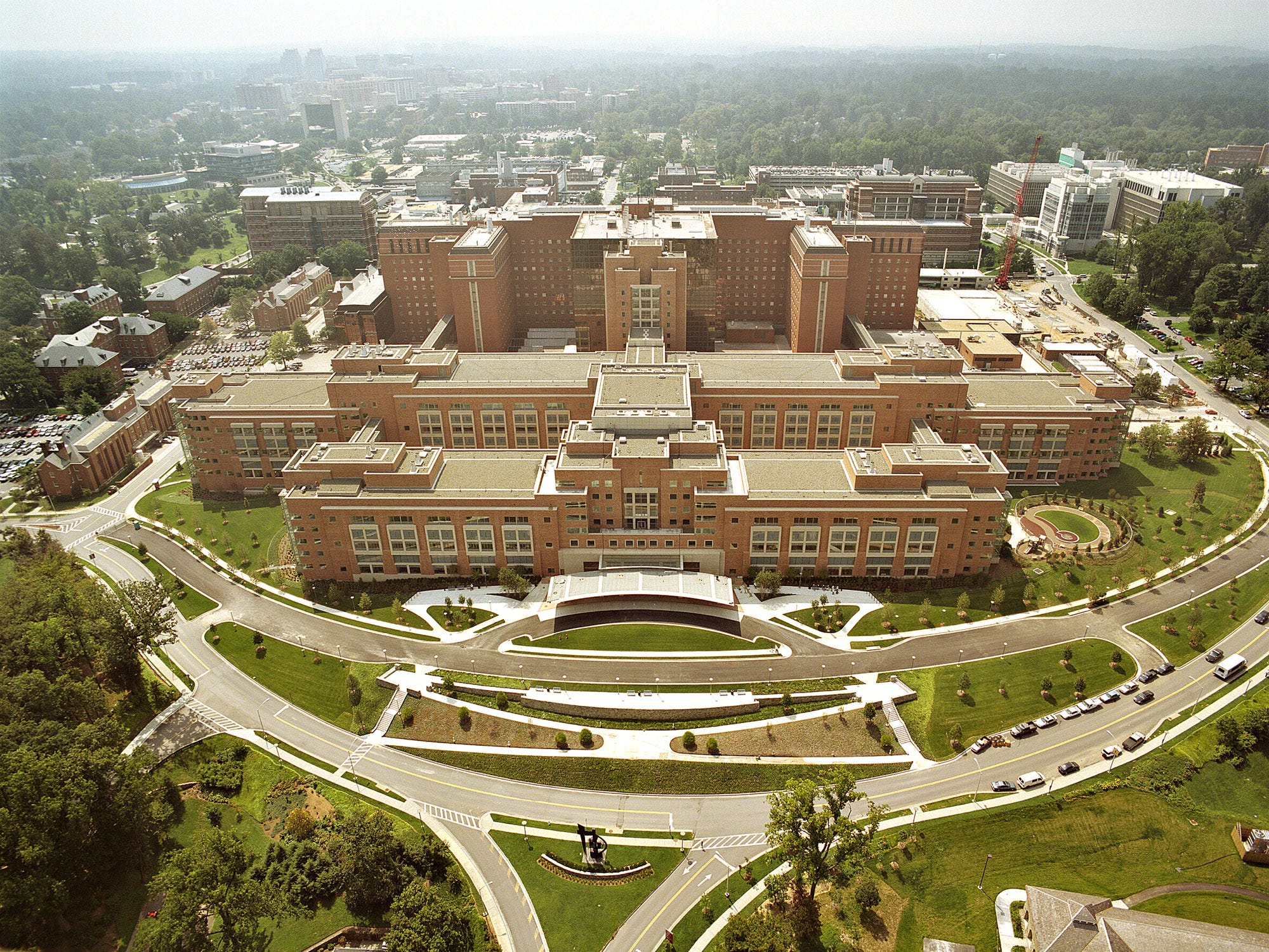
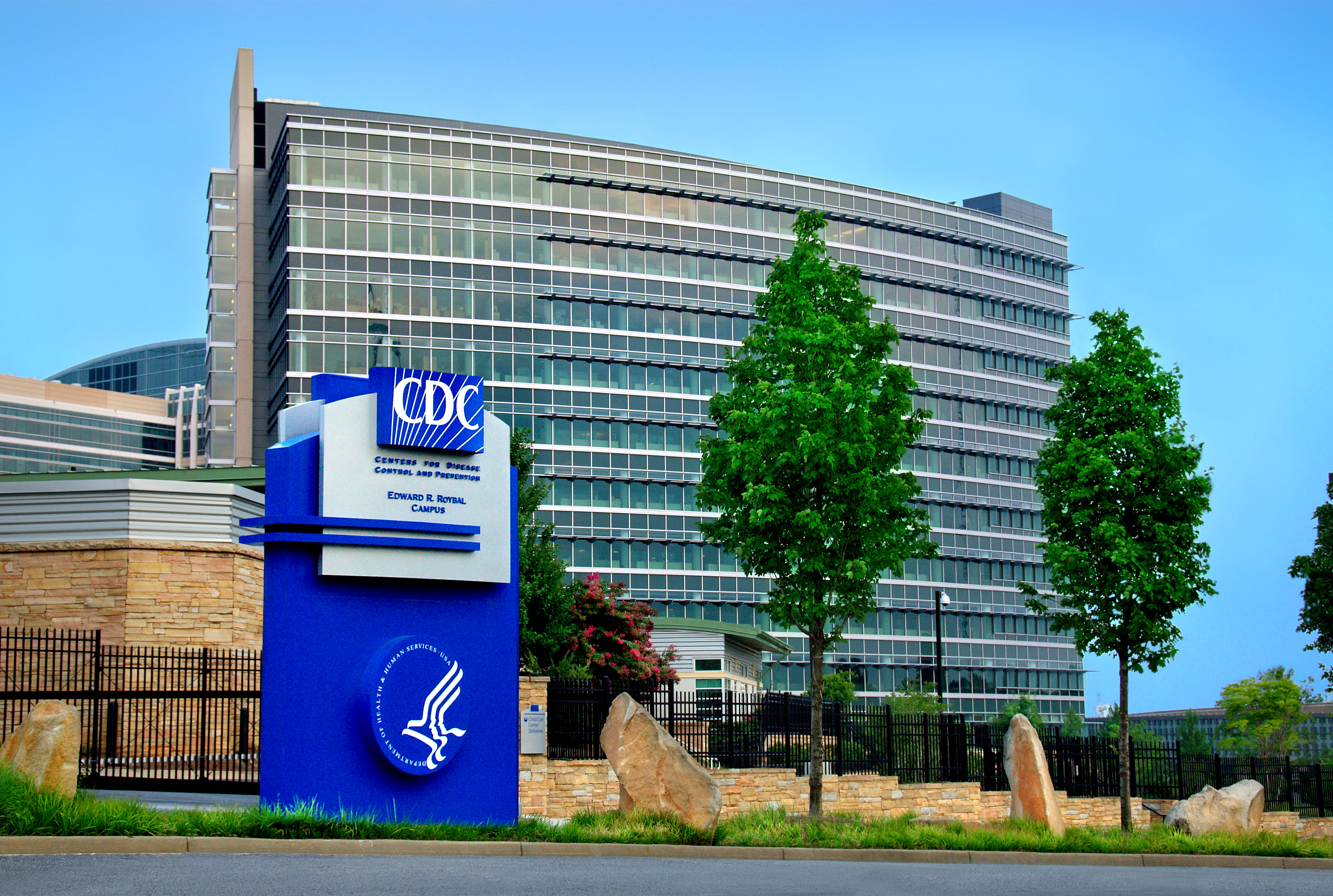
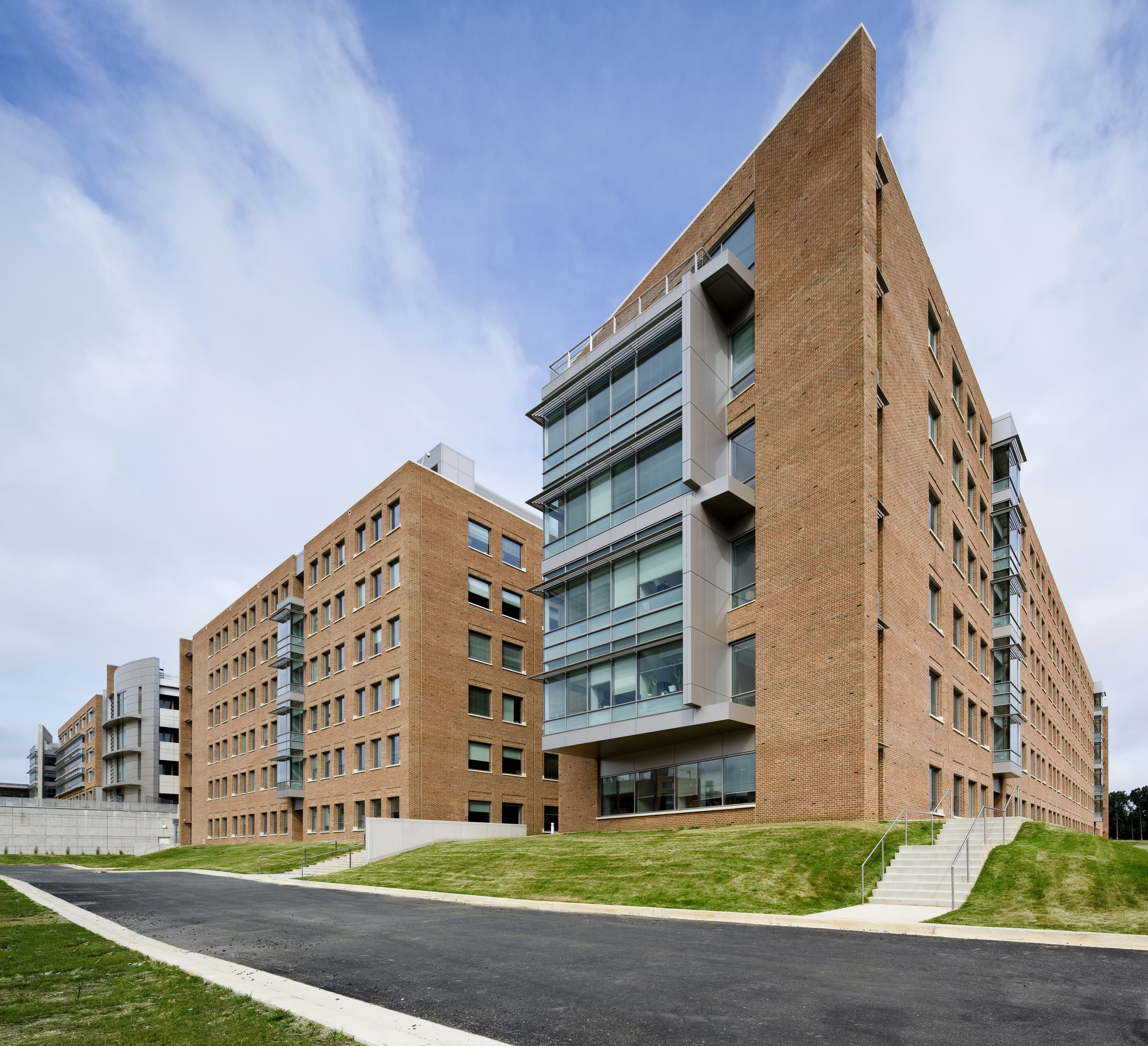
The National Institutes of Health (top), Centers for Disease Control and Prevention (middle), and Food and Drug Administration (bottom) account for nearly all Title 42 appointments.

The Public Health Service consists of eight of the eleven agencies within the Department of Health and Human Services that deal with public health. As of 2010, there were 6,697 employees working in Public Health Service Title 42 positions. Of these, 4,879 were in the National Institutes of Health (NIH), 929 were in the Centers for Disease Control and Prevention (CDC), 862 were in the Food and Drug Administration, and 27 were in other agencies. This accounted for 25% of all NIH employees, including 44% of the research and clinical practitioner workforce; 10% of CDC employees; and 6% of FDA employees. The number of Title 42 appointees increased by 25% from 2006 to 2010. There is a total pay cap of $275,000 for Title 42 appointees; about one-fifth of Title 42 appointments pay higher than $155,500 in 2010, which is equivalent to Level IV of the Executive Schedule and the highest pay allowable to General Schedule employees.

As of 2014, Title 42 appointments can last for five years with an unlimited number of extensions. Special consultants under 209(f) are usually appointed as senior officials in the Office of the Director of the relevant agency, while the fellowships under 209(g) are used to hire research scientists and clinicians. In order to hire under Title 42, it must be documented that candidates could not be found through traditional hiring authorities such as Title 5, the Senior Biomedical Research Service, and the Public Health Service Commissioned Corps. However, a small number of high-level positions are exempt from the documentation requirement, including Senior Investigators, Scientific Executives, Institute and Center Directors, and the NIH Deputy Director.

Within NIH, Title 42 appointments may be used to fill Senior Investigator/Scientist/Clinician, Investigator, Staff Scientist/Clinician, Adjunct Investigator, Senior Research/Clinical Fellow, and Research/Clinical Fellow positions.

Within CDC, there are three categories of Title 42 appointment. Regular Fellows are classified as trainees; they must have at least a bachelor's degree and receive pay equal to GS-5 through GS-9 on the General Schedule. Associate Service Fellows and Senior Service Fellows require a master's degree or doctoral degree respectively, plus related post-graduate experience. Associate Service Fellows receive pay equal to GS-9 through GS-12, and Senior Service Fellows receive pay equal to GS-13 through GS-15, with both receiving retirement and insurance benefits.

Within FDA, Title 42 appointments are divided into Service Fellowships, Commissioner's Fellowships, Special Consultants, and Special Government Employees. Service Fellows must have a doctoral degree and are divided into Staff Fellows, who have less than two years of postdoctoral experience, and Senior Staff Fellows who have more than two years of postdoctoral experience. Staff Fellows receive pay equal to GS-9 through GS-12, and Senior Staff Fellows receive pay equal to GS-13 through GS-15. The Commissioner's Fellowship program is a two-year appointment involving coursework and a research project, requires either a doctoral degree or a lower degree in engineering, and pays equivalent to step one of GS-11, 12, or 13.

=== Environmental Protection Agency ===
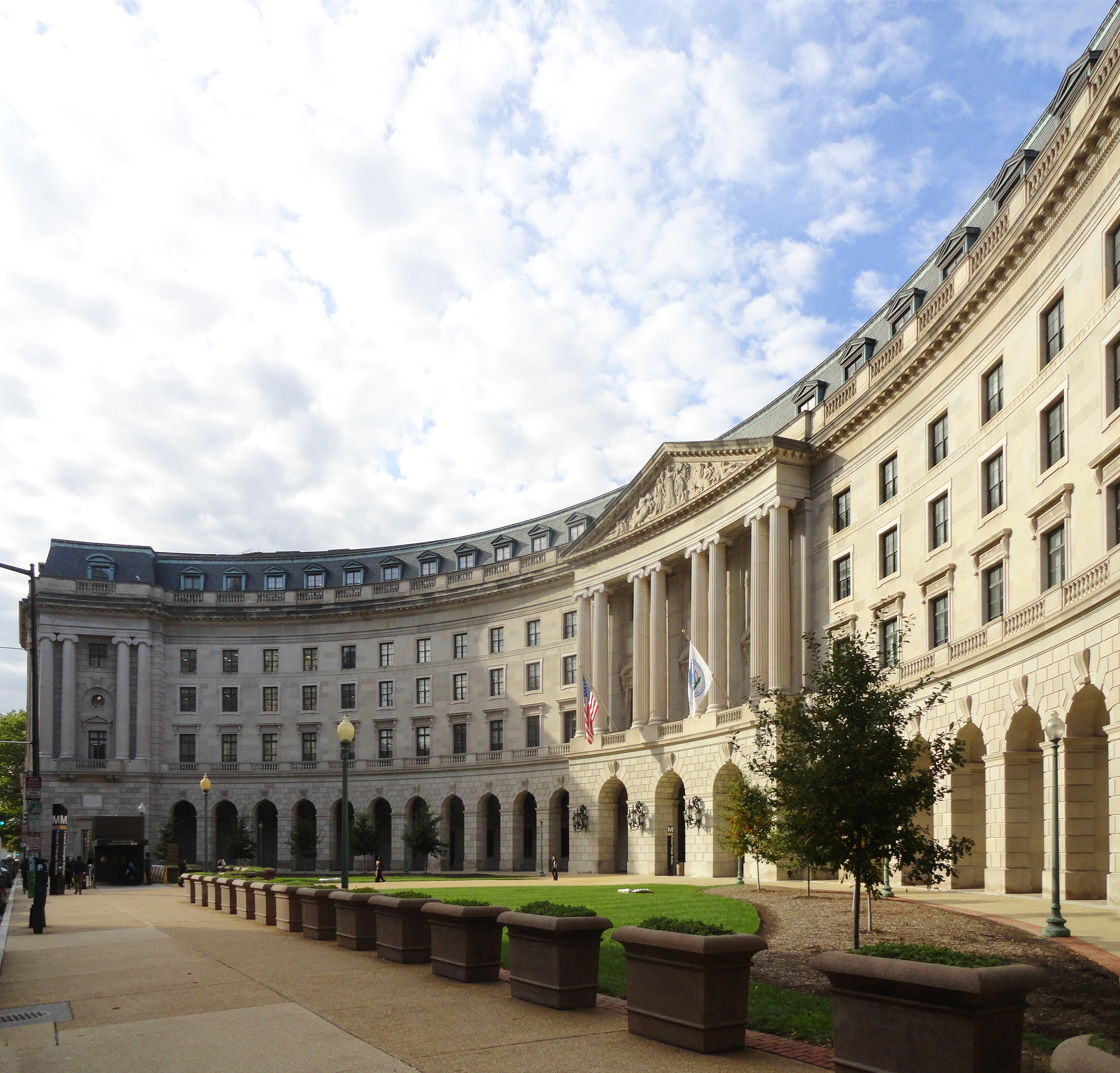
The Environmental Protection Agency was given authority to make a limited number of Title 42 appointments in 2006.

Beginning in 2006, the Environmental Protection Agency has been able to make Title 42 appointments in its Office of Research and Development. This authority was given because existing types of positions were too restricted to either administrative management, advisory functions, and laboratory research, with little flexibility to combine more than one of these; and because the hiring processes were too slow and the salaries uncompetitive.

The authority is generally used to appoint scientists and senior managers; as of 2014, most of the Title 42 appointments were for Division Directors or National Program Directors. The number of Title 42 appointments has been subject to a cap; since 2014 the cap has been 50 appointees at any one time. As of 2013, Title 42 appointees were paid in a band of $130,810–250,000.

== History ==
These provisions were first enacted in 1944 as part of the Public Health Service Act, and as of 2012 had not been amended since. It was an extension of an authority that had originally been given to the National Cancer Institute in 1937. Regulations were first issued in 1947. Until 1966, there were limitations on the number of days per fiscal year Title 42 appointees could work, initially limited to half the number of working days. Beginning in 1956, a pay cap was instituted on Title 42 positions that is higher than that permitted to General Schedule appointees.

In 2005, Congress extended Title 42 hiring authority to the Environmental Protection Agency. This was the result of a recommendation in a 2000 National Research Council report. Initially this was limited to five appointments per fiscal year; as part of the Omnibus Appropriations Act, 2009, this was changed to a cap of 30 persons at any one time, and the Consolidated Appropriations Act, 2014 increased the cap to 50 persons.
