= Federal Salary Council =

The Federal Salary Council (FSC) is an advisory body of the executive branch of the United States government. Established under the provisions of Title 5, section 5304(e) of the United States Code, the FSC provides recommendations on the locality pay program, created by the Federal Employees Pay Comparability Act of 1990 (FEPCA). The locality pay program provides for localized pay differentials, also known as "comparability payments," for federal employees paid under the pay scale of the United States federal civil service who work in the United States and its territories and possessions. Section 1911 of Public Law 111-84, the Non-Foreign Area Retirement Equity Assurance Act of 2009, phased in locality pay for employees in the non-foreign areas as identified in Title 5 of the Code of Federal Regulations (5 C.F.R. 591.205). Alaska and Hawaii are separate locality-pay areas with separate pay tables. Other non-foreign areas are included as part of the "Rest of U.S." locality pay area.

By law, the President of the United States appoints the members of FSC, including three experts in labor relations and pay policy and six representatives of trade unions and other employee organizations representing large numbers of federal civil service employees paid according to the General Schedule (GS) pay scale. The FSC submits recommendations on the locality pay program to the President's Pay Agent, a body consisting of the Secretary of Labor and the Directors of the Office of Management and Budget (OMB) and of the Office of Personnel Management (OPM). The FSC's recommendations cover the establishment or modification of pay localities, the coverage of salary surveys (conducted by the Bureau of Labor Statistics) used to set locality pay, the process for making pay comparisons, and the level of comparability payments that should be made. The FSC's recommendations are advisory only; the President's Pay Agent makes the final determination as to the establishment or disestablishment of locality pay areas and also makes recommendations to the President regarding locality pay percentages that would go into effect under FEPCA. Under Executive Order 12764 of June 5, 1991, the OPM provides administrative support for the FSC.

== History ==
President Donald Trump appointed three expert members to the council: Dr. Ronald Sanders, chair, a human resources professional; Jill L. Nelson, vice-chair, chair of the Federal Prevailing Rate Advisory Committee; and Katja Bullock, a special assistant to the president and associate director of the Presidential Personnel Office. Current union members on the council are Louis P. Cannon, trustee, Fraternal Order of Police; J. David Cox, president, American Federation of Government Employees (AFGE); Randy L. Erwin, president, National Federation of Federal Employees; Anthony M. Reardon, president, National Treasury Employees Union; and Jacqueline Simon, public policy director, AFGE. Jill Nelson was appointed vice chair in September 2018.

On October 26, 2020, Ronald Sanders, the most recent chair of FSC, resigned in protest of Executive Order 13957 of October 21, two weeks before the 2020 elections, creating the Schedule F classification. Writing that he was a "lifelong Republican" who prided himself on having "served three Democratic and three Republican presidents," Sanders sent a letter to John D. McEntee, Presidential Personnel Office director, characterizing the order, which had purported to hold federal employees more accountable, as a transparent attempt to remove long-standing employment protections from federal workers.
