= Pathways Programs =

The Pathways Programs are a series of programs of the U.S. Office of Personnel Management geared toward inviting talented students and recent graduates into federal employment. The programs were instituted as a result of an executive order signed in 2010, which incorporated both preexisting and new programs.

== Programs ==
People selected through the programs are appointed as Schedule D appointments in the excepted service of the United States federal civil service, defined as those where competitive service requirements "make impracticable the adequate recruitment of sufficient numbers".

=== Internship Program ===
The Internship Program is for current students. It replaced the Student Career Experience Program (SCEP) and Student Temporary Employment Program (STEP). The new Internship Program provides students in high schools, colleges, trade schools and other qualifying educational institutions with paid opportunities to work in agencies and explore Federal careers while completing their education.

SCEP was a subsection of its umbrella program the Student Educational Employment Program which was established on December 16, 1994.

According to the Office of Personnel Management the program offers an extensive and rare opportunity for both the Government Agency and the student. "The Student Educational Employment Program benefits both agencies and students. Agencies can discover first-hand the abilities of a potential employee. In the case of SCEP, agencies can bring well educated graduates into their workforce while at the same time give their managers the ability to evaluate the student's performance in real work situations. Students, on the other hand, can avail themselves of such flexibilities as year round employment and flexible work schedules and assignments. Students in the SCEP gain exposure to public service while enhancing their educational goals and shaping their career choices." Many federal agencies, such as the IRS, have been able to hire employees to do higher-graded work at lower pay levels.

=== Recent Graduates Program ===
The Recent Graduates Program is for individuals who, within the previous two years (or six years for veterans), graduated from qualifying educational institutions with an associates, bachelors, masters, professional, doctorate, vocational or technical degree or certificate from qualifying educational institutions.

=== Presidential Management Fellows Program ===
The Presidential Management Fellows Program is the Federal Government's premier leadership development program for candidates who have received an advanced degree such as masters or professional degrees within the preceding two years.
