= SCEP =

SCEP may refer to:

- Communications, Energy and Paperworkers Union of Canada
- Simple Certificate Enrollment Protocol
- Sony Computer Entertainment Poland
- Southern California Earthquake Center
- Student Career Experience Program, the United States Office of Personnel Management's (OPMs) program to bring experienced students into new government careers
- Microsoft System Center Endpoint Protection, for Forefront Antivirus Management
