= Senior Service (disambiguation) =

The Senior Service is a nickname for the Royal Navy.

Senior Service may also refer to:

== Military and government ==
- Höherer Dienst (senior service), a grade in the German civil service Beamter
- Service by a United States federal judge in senior status
- Senior Service Fellow, under U.S. Title 42 appointment

=== Services that are recognized as the senior ===
- Indian Army, the senior service of the Indian Armed Forces
- Pakistan Army, the senior service of the Pakistan Armed Forces
- British South Africa Police

== Music ==
- "Senior Service" (song), a song by Elvis Costello from the 1979 album Armed Forces
- "Senior Service", a 1980 song by Steeleye Stan off the album Sails of Silver
- The Senior Service (band), a band signed to the British record label Damaged Goods (record label)

== Sports ==
- Senior Service Tournament, a 1960s British golf tournament sponsored by the cigarette brand
- RAC Senior Service Tourist Trophy, part of the 1965 World Sportscar Championship; a race sponsored by the Senior Service cigarette brand

== Other uses ==
- Senior Service (cigarette), a brand of British cigarettes
- Senior Service Award, an award presented by the Phi Chi medical fraternity

== See also ==
- Senior Service America, a former division of Alliance for Retired Americans before splitting off
- United States senior military college
