= FWS (disambiguation) =

FWS may refer to:

== Government ==
- Federal Wage System, a program of the United States Office of Personnel Management
- Federal Work-Study Program, of the United States Department of Education
- United States Fish and Wildlife Service, an agency of the United States Department of the Interior
- Frank-Walter Steinmeier, currently serving as the 12th Federal President of Germany

== Aviation ==
- Fort Worth Spinks Airport, in Texas, United States
- United States Air Force Fighter Weapons School, now the United States Air Force Weapons School
- United States Navy Fighter Weapons School, now the United States Navy Strike Fighter Tactics Instructor program
- Vienna Airport railway station, in Austria

== Other uses ==
- The Falcon and the Winter Soldier, a Disney+ miniseries
- Fetal warfarin syndrome
- Formula Winter Series, a motor racing championship
- For Women Scotland, a Scottish feminist organization

== See also ==
- FW (disambiguation)
