= Lloyd–La Follette Act =

1912 US law on civil service protections

- Long title: An Act making appropriations for the service of the Post Office Department for the fiscal year ending June thirtieth, nineteen hundred and thirteen, and for other purposes.
- Enacted by: the 62nd United States Congress
- Effective: August 24, 1912

Citations
- Statutes at Large: 37 Stat. 555

Legislative history
- Passed the House on; Passed the Senate on; Signed into law by President William Howard Taft on August 24, 1912

The Lloyd–La Follette Act of 1912 began the process of protecting civil servants in the United States from unwarranted or abusive removal by codifying "just cause" standards previously embodied in presidential orders. It defines "just causes" as those that would promote the "efficiency of the service." August 24, 1912, § 6, 37 Stat. 555, 5 U.S.C. § 7511

The Act further states that "the right of employees ... to furnish information to either House of Congress, or to a committee or Member thereof, may not be interfered with or denied." 5 U.S.C. § 7211

== Legislative history ==
Under the leadership of Republican Senator Robert M. La Follette, Sr., the United States Congress passed the Act with the intention of conferring job protection rights on federal employees they had not previously had. Prior to this, there was no such statutory inhibition on the authority of the government to discharge a federal employee, and an employee could be discharged with or without cause for conduct which was not protected under the First Amendment. James Tilghman Lloyd a Democratic congressman from Missouri, led the effort to pass the bill in the House of Representatives.

The act was passed after the Theodore Roosevelt (in 1902) and Taft (in 1909) administrations prohibited federal employees from communicating with Congress without authorization from their superiors. This language was later placed in the Civil Service Reform Act of 1978 and codified in 5 U.S.C. § 7211. The purpose of this Act was to allow Congress to obtain uncensored, essential information from federal employees. Congress intended to allow the federal workers direct access to Congress in order to register complaints about conduct by their supervisors and to report corruption or incompetence.

In Arnett v. Kennedy the Supreme Court addressed questions about the Act. It held that the Act's standard of employment protection, which describes as explicitly as is feasible in view of the wide variety of factual situations where employees' statements might justify dismissal for "cause" the conduct that is ground for removal, is not impermissibly vague or overbroad in regulating federal employees' speech.

One of the primary purposes of the Act was to protect those who criticize superiors from official retribution. Senator La Follette gave the following example of an abuse sought to be cured by the bill:

The cause for [the employee's] dismissal was that he gave publicity to the insanitary conditions existing in some part of the post-office building in Chicago where the clerks were required to perform their services. ... [H]e furnished some facts to the press of Chicago, and the publication was made of the conditions. They were simply horrible. ... The public health officers of Chicago, as soon as their attention was called to the conditions, condemned the situation as they found it; and yet this young man, one of the brightest fellows I have met, was removed from the service because, he had given publicity to these outrageous conditions. 48 Congressional Record, Vol. -1806, Page 10731 (1912).

The Act was thus the first federal law enacted specifically to protect whistleblowers.

The history and scope of the Act was further described by the Supreme Court of the United States in Bush v. Lucas, 462 U.S. 367, 103 S.Ct. 2404 (1983).

Congressional attention to the problem of politically-motivated removals was again prompted by the issuance of Executive Orders by Presidents Roosevelt and Taft that forbade federal employees to communicate directly with Congress without the permission of their supervisors. ... These "gag orders," enforced by dismissal, were cited by several legislators as the reason for enacting the Lloyd–La Follette Act in 1912, 37 Stat. 555, § 6.FN20 That statute ... explicitly guaranteed that the right of civil servants "to furnish information to either House of Congress, or to any committee or member thereof, shall not be denied or interfered with." FN22 As the House Report explained, this legislation was intended "to protect employees against oppression and in the right of free speech and the right to consult their representatives." FN23 In enacting the Lloyd–La Follette Act, Congress weighed the competing policy considerations and concluded that efficient management of government operations did not preclude the extension of free speech rights to government employees.FN24

Footnote 20. See 48 Cong.Rec. 4513 (1912) (remarks of Rep. Gregg) ("[I]t is for the purpose of wiping out the existence of this despicable 'gag rule' that this provision is inserted. The rule is unjust, unfair, and against the provisions of the Constitution of the United States, which provides for the right of appeal and the right of free speech to all its citizens.") A number of the bill's proponents asserted that the gag rule violated the First Amendment rights of civil servants. See, e.g., id., at 4653 (remarks of Rep. Calder) (1912); id., at 4738 (remarks of Rep. Blackmon); id., at 5201 (remarks of Rep. Prouty); id., at 5223 (remarks of Rep. O'Shaunessy); id., at 5634 (remarks of Rep. Lloyd); id., at 5637-5638 (remarks of Rep. Wilson); id., at 10671 (remarks of Sen. Ashurst); id., at 10673 (remarks of Sen. Reed); id., at 10793 (remarks of Sen. Smith); id., at 10799 (remarks of Sen. La Follette).

Footnote 22. This provision was accompanied by a more specific guarantee that membership in any independent association of postal employees seeking improvements in wages, hours, and working conditions, or the presentation to Congress of any grievance, "shall not constitute or be cause for reduction in rank or compensation or removal of such person or groups of persons from said service."

Footnote 23. H.R.Rep. No. 388, 62d Cong., 2d Sess. 7 (1912).

Footnote 24. Members of the House, which originated § 6, suggested that it would improve the efficiency and morale of the civil service. "It will do away with the discontent and suspicion which now exists among the employees and will restore that confidence which is necessary to get the best results from the employees." 48 Cong.Rec. 4654 (1912) (remarks of Rep. Calder); see id., at 5635 (remarks of Rep. Lloyd).

The Senate Committee initially took a different position, urging in its report that the relevant language, see id., at 10732 (House version) be omitted entirely:

As to the last clause in section 6, it is the view of the committee that all citizens have a constitutional right as such to present their grievances to Congress or Members thereof. But governmental employees occupy a position relative to the Government different from that of ordinary citizens. Upon questions of interest to them as citizens, governmental employees have a right to petition Congress direct. A different rule should prevail with regard to their presentation of grievances connected with their relation to the Government as employees. In that respect good discipline and the efficiency of the service requires that they present their grievances through the proper administrative channels." S.Rep. No. 955, 62d Cong.2d Sess. 21 (1912).

As Sen. Bourne explained, "it was believed by the committee that to recognize the right of the individual employee to go over the head of his superior and go to Members of Congress on matters appertaining to his own particular grievances, or for his own selfish interest, would be detrimental to the service itself; that it would absolutely destroy the discipline necessary for good service." 48 Cong.Rec. 10676 (1912).

This view did not prevail. After extended discussion in floor debate concerning the right to organize and the right to present grievances to Congress, id., at 10671-10677, 10728-10733, 10792-10804, the committee offered and the Senate approved a compromise amendment to the House version, guaranteeing both rights at least in part, which was subsequently enacted into law. Id., at 10804; 37 Stat. 555.

== Subsequent legislation ==
In 1997, the Justice Department argued that Congress does not have a constitutional right to obtain information from civil servants through unauthorized disclosures. Based on its analysis of disclosure laws and its stance on separation of powers, Justice argued that Congress cannot vest "in executive branch employees a right to provide classified information to members of Congress without official authorization."

In 1997, Congress adopted an anti-gag rule. The government-wide prohibition on the use of appropriated funds to pay the salary of any federal official who prohibits or prevents or threatens to prohibit or prevent a federal employee from contacting Congress first appeared in the Treasury and General Government Appropriations Act, 1998, Pub. L. 105–61 (text) (PDF), 111 Stat. 1318, (1997). In 1997, the Senate passed a prohibition that applied only to the Postal Service, while the House of Representatives passed a government-wide prohibition. The conference report adopted the House version, and a government-wide prohibition has been included in every Treasury-Postal appropriations act since fiscal year 1998.

This provision has its antecedents in several older pieces of legislation, including the Treasury Department Appropriation Act of 1972, the Lloyd–La Follette Act of 1912, and the Civil Service Reform Act of 1978.

In 2006, Rep. John Conyers included the Lloyd–La Follette Act in a list of 26 laws that he contends President George W. Bush violated.

== See also ==
- Civil Service
- First Amendment to the United States Constitution
- United States civil service
- Whistleblower
