= Excepted service =

U.S. federal civil service component

The excepted service is the part of the United States federal civil service that is not part of either the competitive service or the Senior Executive Service. It allows streamlined hiring processes to be used under certain circumstances.

== Overview ==
Most civilian positions in the federal government of the United States are part of the competitive service, where applicants must compete with other applicants in open competition under the merit system administered by the Office of Personnel Management. However, some positions are excluded from these provisions, and some agencies are composed entirely of excepted service positions. Agencies with excepted service positions may employ unique evaluation criteria, such as with research grade evaluation scientists, who are reviewed based on scientific output. Some agencies may use excepted service hiring authorities, such as Veterans Recruitment Appointment (VRA) or Schedule A (disability). Positions filled using these hiring authorities (and which are not always excepted service, such as attorneys) may remain in the excepted service or may convert to the competitive service after a set amount of time (usually two years).

A common feature of many of these agencies and positions is that they have national security and/or intelligence functions, such as the National Geospatial-Intelligence Agency, National Reconnaissance Office, Central Intelligence Agency, the Department of State, the Defense Intelligence Agency, the Defense Counterintelligence and Security Agency, the National Security Agency, the Federal Bureau of Investigation, U.S. Secret Service, and the NCIS. Attorney positions, Presidential Management Fellows, Presidential Innovation Fellows, and Foreign Service positions are examples of positions excepted across-the-board in all Federal agencies. Not all excepted service members serve in sensitive areas—for example, teachers and administrators at DOD schools, both in the U.S. and overseas, are also excepted. In addition, most employees in the legislative branch of the federal government are excepted service employees.

Until the Civil Service Due Process Amendments Act of 1990 (Pub. L. No. 101-376, 104 Stat. 461), employees in the excepted service who did not have veteran's preference did not have the right to appeal adverse actions to the United States Merit Systems Protection Board (MSPB). These amendments made it so that most employees in the excepted service, who had completed a two-year trial period (also called a probationary period) had appeal rights. The current statute (5 U.S.C. section 7511(b)) excludes certain positions, including anyone whose appointment was made by the advice and consent of the Senate, anyone appointed by the President, anyone whose position was determined to be of a confidential, policy-determining, policy-making, or policy-advocating character by the President or the Office of Personnel Management, members of the Foreign Service, employees of the Central Intelligence Agency or Government Accountability Office, and many employees of the Postal Service, Postal Regulatory Commission, Panama Canal Commission, the Tennessee Valley Authority, the Federal Bureau of Investigation, and intelligence components of the Department of Defense. These employees have no right to external appeals.

== Legal basis ==
From 5 U.S.C. § 2103:

(a) For the purpose of this title, the excepted service consists of those civil service positions which are not in the competitive service or the Senior Executive Service.

(b) As used in other Acts of the United States Congress, “unclassified civil service” or “unclassified service” means the “excepted service”.

== Hiring authorities ==

- Schedule A: 13.8%
- Schedule B: 1.3%
- Schedule C: 0.2%
- Schedule D: 2.5%
- Executive: 0.1%
- Other: 82.1%
Excepted service positions by hiring
authority in 2015

A hiring authority is the law, executive order, or regulation that allows an agency to hire a person into the federal civil service.

=== Office of Personnel Management schedules ===
Some service positions are classified by the Office of Personnel Management into lettered categories, although not all excepted service authorities fall into this classification:

- Schedule A appointments are "impracticable to examine." They are used to appoint specific position types such as attorneys, chaplains, physicians; when there is a critical hiring need or the position is in a remote location; and to hire disabled applicants. In addition to this, as of 2016, there were 122 agency-unique Schedule A hiring authorities.
- Schedule B appointments are "not practicable to hold a competitive examination". Schedule B appointees must meet the qualification standards for the job. As of 2016, there were 36 agency-unique Schedule B hiring authorities.
- Schedule C appointments are political appointments to confidential or policy-setting positions.
- Schedule D appointments are those where competitive service requirements "make impracticable the adequate recruitment of sufficient numbers". These are known as the Pathways Programs, which consist of the Internship Program, Recent Graduates Program, and Presidential Management Fellows Program.
- Schedule E appointments are administrative law judges.
- Schedule Policy/Career appointments, formerly known as Schedule F appointments apply to "confidential, policy-determining, policy-making, or policy-advocating positions."

Schedules A and B were created by the Pendleton Civil Service Reform Act of 1883, Schedule C was created in 1956, and Schedule D was created in 2012. Schedule E was created in 2018. Schedule F was created in October 2020 and repealed in January 2021, and was reinstated in January 2025.

=== Other hiring authorities ===
Several excepted service hiring authorities are not classified into the OPM schedules. Some of the more prevalent include:

- Title 38 appointments are for the Department of Veterans Affairs to hire certain medical occupations. The National Institutes of Health also uses Title 38 appointments for health care occupations that provide direct patient care services or services incident to it.
- A Title 42 appointment allows scientists and special consultants to be hired as part of the Public Health Service or Environmental Protection Agency under a streamlined process.
- A National Guard technician hiring authority is used for the Army Reserve Technician Program and Air Reserve Technician Program.
- There is a Veterans Recruitment Appointment authority.
- There are also agency-wide excepted service authorities, of which the largest are the Transportation Security Administration and Federal Aviation Administration.
- The Senior Biomedical Research Service, formally the Silvio O. Conte Senior Biomedical Research and Biomedical Product Assessment Service, is for scientific and technical experts in biomedical research, clinical research evaluation, and biomedical product assessment. It was created by the Federal Employees Pay Comparability Act of 1990 and implemented in 1995, because the National Institutes of Health concluded that the Senior Executive Service was not ideally suited for their purposes, and a personnel system more similar to academia was needed. Initially there was a cap of 500 individuals in the Service, but the 21st Century Cures Act increased this to 2000 individuals in 2016.

== Principal excepted agencies ==
The following are selected excepted service agencies:

- Administrative Office of the U.S. Courts
- National Geospatial-Intelligence Agency (NGA)
- National Reconnaissance Office (NRO)
- Central Intelligence Agency (CIA)
- Corporation for National and Community Service
- Defense Counterintelligence and Security Agency (DCSA)
- Defense Intelligence Agency (DIA)
- Federal Air Marshal Service (FAMS)
- Federal Aviation Administration (FAA)
- Federal Bureau of Investigation (FBI)
- Federal Emergency Management Agency (FEMA)
- Federal Reserve Board
- Library of Congress
- National Nuclear Security Administration (NNSA)
- National Security Agency (NSA)
- Nuclear Regulatory Commission (NRC)
- Peace Corps
- Tennessee Valley Authority (TVA)
- United States Agency for International Development (USAID)
- United States Capitol Police (USCP)
- United States Congress - Personal Office Staff
- Transportation Security Administration (TSA)
- United States Postal Service (USPS)
- United States Secret Service (USSS)
- United States Election Assistance Commission
- U.S. Supreme Court, Personnel Office
- United States Patent and Trademark Office (USPTO)
- Department of Defense Cyber Excepted Service (CES)
