= Competitive service =

Part of the US civil service

The competitive service is a part of the United States federal government civil service. Applicants for jobs in the competitive civil service must compete with other applicants in open competition under the merit system administered by the Office of Personnel Management, unlike applicants in the excepted service and Senior Executive Service. There are several hiring authorities for the competitive service, including "traditional" competitive examining, as well as expedited procedures such as Direct Hire Authority and the Veterans Employment Opportunities Act.

Notably, the procedures for firing and demoting a member of the competitive service are considerable in order to protect the employment rights of the member, yet to provide the employer (the US government) a fair and incremental method to manage employees. A written notice of thirty days, a statement of reasons for dismissal, and a right to a hearing must be granted.

In 2015, 69.9% of the federal workforce was in the competitive service.

== Legislative basis ==
According to U.S. Code Title 5 §2102, The "competitive service" consists of:

1. all civil service positions in the executive branch, except—
  1. positions which are specifically excepted from the competitive service by or under statute;
  2. positions to which appointments are made by nomination for confirmation by the United States Senate, unless the Senate otherwise directs; and
  3. positions in the Senior Executive Service.

== Hiring authorities ==
A hiring authority is the law, executive order, or regulation that allows an agency to hire a person into the federal civil service. Competitive Examining is the "traditional" competitive hiring authority, but it is not the only one. The Direct Hire Authority allows an expedited process for agencies to fill certain positions that have been deemed to have a severe candidate shortage or a critical hiring need. The Veterans Employment Opportunities Act allows eligible veterans to apply for certain positions. There are also hiring authorities for reappointments of both permanent and temporary positions. Title 21 appointments were created by the 21st Century Cures Act in 2016 for scientific, technical, or professional positions in the Food and Drug Administration that support the development, review, and regulation of medical products.

The following chart shows the number of hires for each of the top-used competitive service hiring authorities in fiscal year 2014:

- Competitive Examining
- Veterans Employment Opportunities Act
- Temporary Reappointment
- Agriculture Alternative Personnel System
- Government-wide Direct Hire Authority
- Reinstatement
- Defense Expedited Hiring Authority

=== Competitive examining ===
Competitive examining is the "traditional" method for making appointments to competitive service positions. It requires adherence to the full range of procedures and protections listed in Title 5 of the United States Code.

Prior to 1996, the process of examining was largely centralized in the Civil Service Commission and later the Office of Personnel Management (OPM). Two amendments in that year allowed examination authority to be delegated to individual federal agencies, and allowed OPM to charge fees to agencies for staffing services. As a result, by 2001 there were nearly 700 examining units across the government with OPM periodically reviewing their activity.

Prior to 2010, competitive examining was subject to the "rule of three" where hiring managers could only select from the top three rated applicants. This was replaced in 2010 with "category rating", where applicants are sorted into two or more categories, and agencies make selections from within the highest quality category regardless of the number of candidates.

=== Direct Hire Authority ===
Direct Hire Authority allows an expedited process for agencies to fill certain positions that have been deemed to have a severe candidate shortage or a critical hiring need. It is authorized by 5 U.S.C. § 3304 and regulations are in 5 CFR 337. OPM determines which positions are eligible for Direct Hire Authority. Government-wide Direct Hire Authority as of 2019 applies to certain medical, scientific, and cybersecurity occupations, as well as positions involved in Iraqi reconstruction efforts. Agencies may also request to OPM that additional specific positions be filled through Direct Hire Authority.

Direct Hire Authority expedites the typical hiring process by eliminating formal competitive rating and ranking procedures, such as the "rule of three" where hiring managers may select from only the top three rated candidates. In addition, veterans’ preference does not apply. However, public notice requirements still apply, such as posting on USAJobs, as well as the one-year probationary period; and the appointee must meet all qualification requirements.

Direct Hire Authority was first authorized by the Homeland Security Act of 2002. In 2003, medical, information security, and Iraqi reconstruction positions were announced as the first eligible government-wide position types. Veterinary positions were added in 2009. In 2018, science, technology, engineering, and mathematics positions as well as additional cybersecurity positions were added to the list.
