= National Security Personnel System =

The National Security Personnel System (NSPS) was a pay for performance pay system created in 2004-5 under authorization by Congress for the United States Department of Defense (DoD) and implemented in mid-2006. NSPS replaced the General Schedule (GS) grade and step system for the DoD with a pay band system intended to provide more flexibility in establishing pay levels. NSPS had differing policies concerning tenure, hiring, reassignment, promotion, collective bargaining, pay, performance measurement and recognition, etc. It purportedly retained EEO and Veterans' Preference protections although the system was not in place long enough to tell whether or not this was true. There was a significant level of controversy as to whether or not the flexibility gained with the new system was at the expense of the Federal employees within DoD and whether or not the flexibility gained came at a bureaucratic price requiring significantly more effort on the part of managers to document performance and manage compensation. Pay increases that were automatic under the GS system did not exist under NSPS. On October 29, 2009, this pay system was repealed, restoring all DoD employees to the General Schedule by January 1, 2012.

== Pay schedules ==
NSPS defined several pay schedules (PS) within four Career Groups (CG), all which break down pay into two or more pay bands (PB).

=== Standard Career Group ===
The Standard career group included four pay schedules:

- Professional/Analyst (YA) This PS included positions in both professional and analytical occupations, to include attorneys. It consisted of three PB.
- Technician/Support (YB) This PS comprised technician and support work in the CG and included three PB.
- Supervisor/Manager (YC) This PS was for employees who supervise work in the Standard CG. There were three PB.
- Student (YP) This program provided for noncompetitive appointments of students to Federal positions.

=== Scientific and Engineering Career Group ===
The Scientific and Engineering career group covered professional, technician, and supervisory work in the engineering and scientific disciplines. It included three pay schedules:

- Professional (YD) Work classified in this schedule was limited to professional engineering and science disciplines. It had three PB.
- Technician/Support (YE) This PS comprised specialized technician work in support of professional engineering and scientific work. It had four PB.
- Supervisor/Manager (YF) This PS was for employees who supervise work in the Scientific and Engineering CG. It had three PB.

=== Medical Career Group ===
The Medical career group consisted of four pay schedules:

- Physician/Dentist (YG) This PS was limited to physicians and dentists based on distance compensation practices and career progression. It had just two PB.
- Professional (YH). All other professionals in the medical field were covered by this PS. It had three PB.
- Technician/Support (YI) This PS included specialized technician and other medical and health support work. It had three PB.
- Supervisor/Manager (YJ) Employees who supervise work in the Medical CG were classified in this PS. There were four PB. Only supervisory physicians and dentists were eligible for PB4.

=== Investigative and Protective Services Career Group ===
The Investigative and Protective Services career group had four pay schedules:

- Investigative (YK) This PS covered investigative and security work and consisted of three PB.
- Fire Protection (YL) This applied to fire fighters, fire chiefs, and fire protection inspectors/specialists. It had four PB.
- Police/Security Guard (YM) This PS had two PB and applied exclusively to two occupations: police officer and security guard.
- Supervisor/Manager (YN) Employees who supervise work in the Investigative and Protective Services CG were classified in this PS. There were three PB.

== Controversy ==
An analysis of NSPS by Federal Times, a branch of the Defense News Media Group, in August 2008 found that the January 2008 issuance of performance-based pay raises and bonuses, the first large-scale payout under the new system, was filled with inequalities. The analysis found that white employees received higher average performance ratings, salary increases and bonuses than employees of other races and ethnicities. Also, employees working at DoD agencies, such as the Defense Finance and Accounting Service, Tricare, the Office of the Inspector General and the Office of the Secretary of Defense, earned higher performance ratings and payouts overall than did their civilian counterparts in the three military service departments: United States Army, United States Navy, and United States Air Force.

The American Federation of Government Employees (AFGE) stated that the analysis supported their concerns about the new system. Brian DeWyngaert, AFGE chief of staff, said, "These systems can have a discriminatory impact. Whether it’s intended or unintended, it happens nevertheless."

== Legislation ==
In June 2009 Congresswoman Carol Shea-Porter (D-NH) was successful in attaching provisions in the House Armed Services Committees’ version of the Fiscal Year 2010 NDAA that would greatly restrict the implementation and potentially the very existence of the NSPS, and the Secretary of Defense would have six months to decide if the program warranted keeping. The Secretary would have to report to Congress that substantial improvements had been made to the pay-for-performance system. The bill called for returning all employees under NSPS back to the GS system within one year of the bill becoming law.

== Repeal ==
On October 29, 2009, President Barack Obama signed legislation repealing NSPS and restoring DOD employees to their previous pay systems. Full implementation of this legislation was to occur no later than January 1, 2012.

== NSPS superseded by similar systems ==
NSPS provisions have migrated to other systems such as "Interim GS" or Science and Technology Reinvention Laboratory (STRL) provisions so that the government can continue its experimentation. See, for example, Federal Register / Vol. 75, No. 174 / Thursday, September 9, 2010 (PDF file 2010-22172.pdf) and later publications related to STRL.

== See also ==
- General_Schedule#List_of_other_pay_scale_terms.5B8.5D
