= Senior Executive Service (United States) =

Federal civil service job classification

- Seal of the U.S. Senior Executive Service

- Flag of the U.S. Senior Executive Service

Agency overview
- Formed: 1979

The Senior Executive Service (SES) is a position classification in the United States federal civil service equivalent to general officer or flag officer rank in the U.S. Armed Forces. It was created in 1979 when the Civil Service Reform Act of 1978 went into effect under President Jimmy Carter.

== Characteristics ==
According to the Office of Personnel Management, the SES was designed to be a corps of executives selected for their leadership qualifications, serving in key positions just below the top presidential appointees as a link between them and the rest of the federal (civil service) workforce. SES positions are considered to be above the GS-15 level of the General Schedule, and below Level III of the Executive Schedule. Career members of the SES ranks are eligible for the Presidential Rank Awards program.

Up to ten percent of SES positions can be filled as political appointments rather than by career employees. About half of the SES is designated "Career Reserved," which can only be filled by career employees. The other half is designated "General," which can be filled by either career employees or political appointments as desired by the administration. Due to the ten-percent limitation, most general positions are still filled by career appointees.

Senior level employees of several agencies are exempt from the SES but have their own senior executive positions; these include the Federal Bureau of Investigation, Central Intelligence Agency, Defense Intelligence Agency, National Security Agency, Transportation Security Administration, Federal Aviation Administration, Government Accountability Office, Members of the Foreign Service, and government corporations.

=== Adverse actions ===
SES career appointees have civil service protections; they may only be fired or suspended for more than fourteen days for misconduct, neglect of duty, malfeasance, or failure to accept a directed reassignment or to accompany a position in a transfer of function. These adverse actions may be appealed to the Merit Systems Protection Board.

An SES career appointee can also be reassigned within the SES, or from the SES into a competitive service position, based on performance ratings. A single unsatisfactory performance rating makes them eligible for reassignment, though it is not mandatory. However, they must be removed from the SES if they receive two unsatisfactory ratings in a period of five consecutive years, or two less than fully successful ratings within three consecutive years. Reassignments may not be appealed to the Merit Systems Protection Board.

SES career appointees in the United States Department of Veterans Affairs have different procedures as a result of the Department of Veterans Affairs Accountability and Whistleblower Protection Act of 2017. The secretary of veterans affairs has discretion to suspend, demote, remove, or take other actions against SES career appointees or other high-level executives if the Secretary determines that the individual’s misconduct or performance warrants such action, with abbreviated notice and appeals rights.

By contrast, noncareer and limited-term SES appointees are generally not subject to removal protections and may be removed from the SES at any time.

== Pay rates ==
(Effective on the first day of the first applicable pay period beginning on or after January 1, 2025)
	Minimum	Maximum
Agencies with a Certified SES Performance Appraisal System	$150,160	$225,700
Agencies without a Certified SES Performance Appraisal System	$150,160	$207,500

Unlike the General Schedule (GS) grades, SES pay is determined at agency discretion within certain parameters, and there is no locality pay adjustment.

The minimum pay level for the SES is set at 120 percent of the basic pay for GS-15 Step 1 employees ($150,160 for 2025). The maximum pay level depends on whether or not the employing agency has a "certified" SES performance appraisal system:

- If the agency has a certified system, the maximum pay is set at Level II of the Executive Schedule ($225,700 for 2025).
- If the agency does not have a certified system, the maximum pay is set at Level III of the Executive Schedule ($207,500 for 2025).

Total aggregate pay is limited to the salary of the vice president of the United States ($289,400 for 2025).

Prior to 2004, the SES used a six-level system. It was replaced with the current open band system on January 1, 2004.

== See also ==
- Senior Foreign Service
- Grands corps de l'État of France
- Indian Administrative Service of India
