= United States Civil Service Commission =

U.S. government agency, 1871–1978

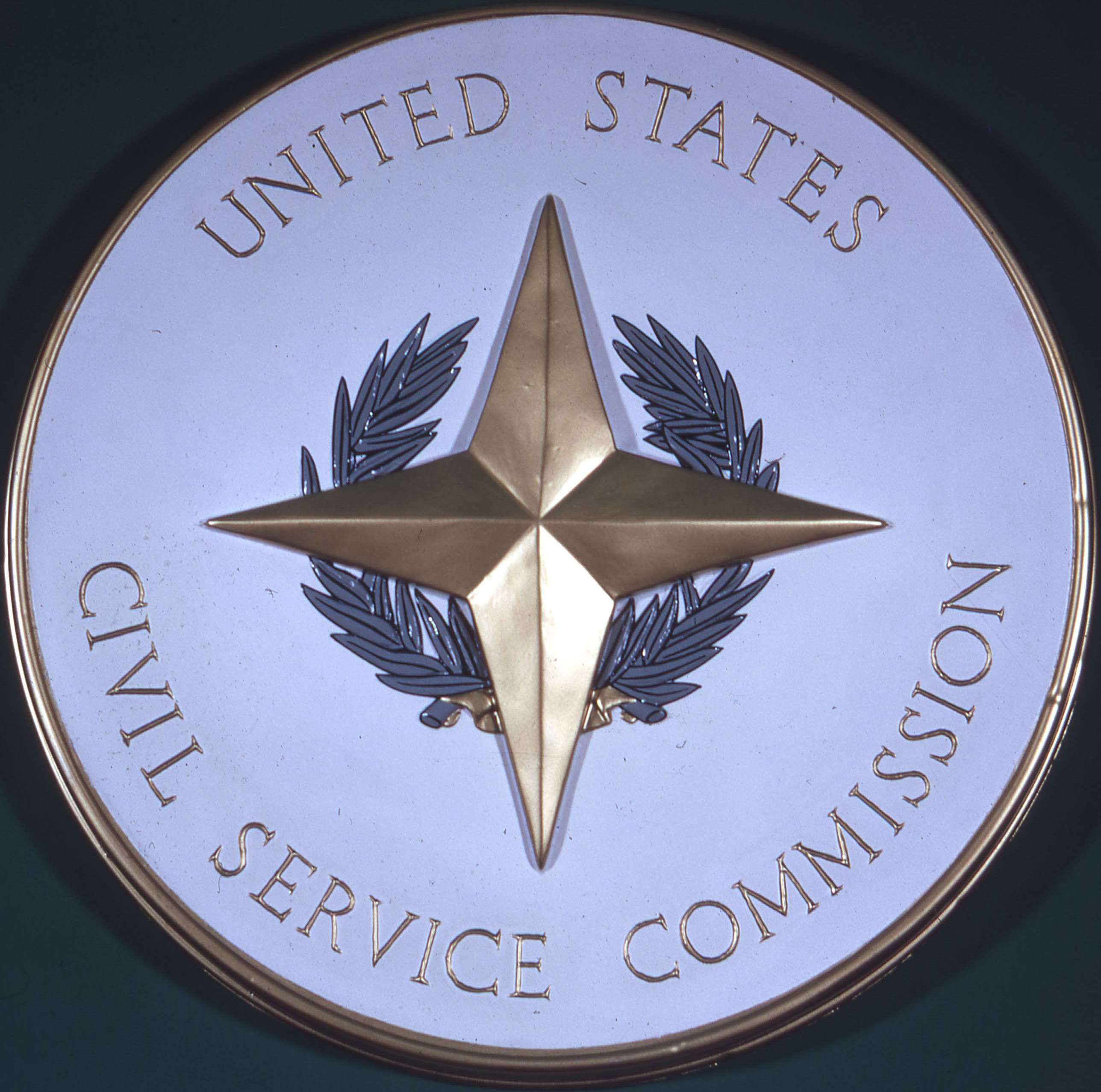
- Official seal

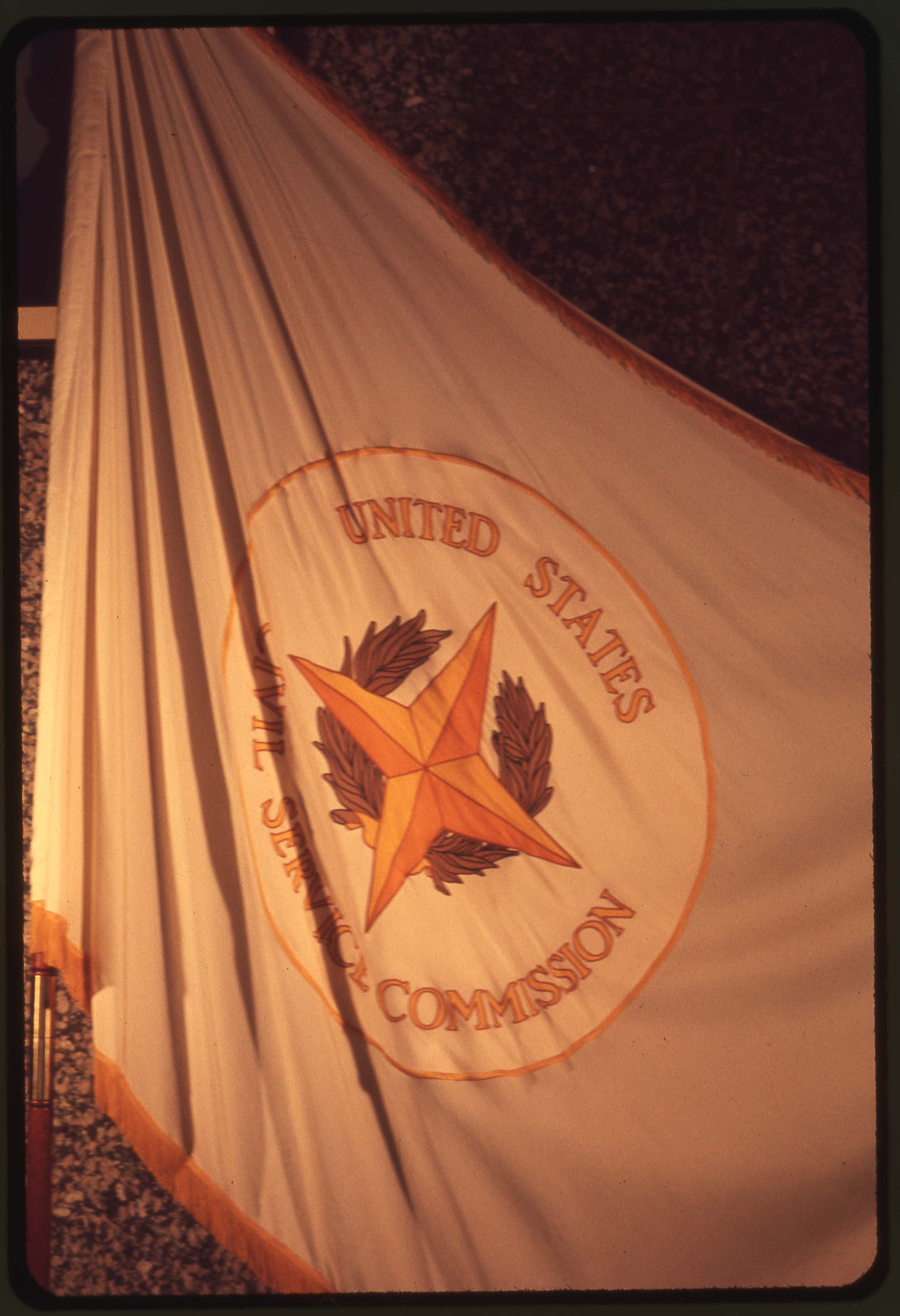
- Official flag

Agency overview
- Formed: March 3, 1871; 155 years ago
- Dissolved: January 1, 1978; 48 years ago
- Superseding agencies: Office of Personnel Management; Merit Systems Protection Board
- Jurisdiction: U.S. federal government

The United States Civil Service Commission was a government agency of the federal government of the United States. It was created to select employees of federal government on merit rather than relationships. In 1979, it was dissolved as part of the Civil Service Reform Act of 1978; the Office of Personnel Management and the Merit Systems Protection Board are the successor agencies.

== History ==
On March 3, 1871, President Ulysses S. Grant signed into law the first U.S. civil service reform legislation, which had been passed by Congress. The act created the United States Civil Service Commission, that was implemented by President Grant and funded for two years by Congress lasting until 1874. However, Congress which relied heavily on patronage, especially the Senate, did not renew funding of the Civil Service Commission. President Grant's successor, President Rutherford B. Hayes requested a renewal of funding but none was granted.

President Hayes' successor, James A. Garfield, advocated Civil Service reform. His efforts against the spoils system, also known as patronage, were cut short after he was assassinated by Charles J. Guiteau.

=== Pendleton law ===
President Garfield's successor, President Chester A. Arthur, took up the cause of Civil Service reform and was able to lobby Congress to pass the Pendleton Civil Service Reform Act in 1883. The Pendleton law was passed in part following a public outcry over the assassination of President Garfield. The Pendleton Act renewed funding for the Civil Service Commission and established a three-man commission to run Civil Service whose commissioners were chosen by President Arthur. The Civil Service Commission administered the civil service of the United States federal government. The Pendleton law required certain applicants to take the civil service exam in order to be given certain jobs; it also prevented elected officials and political appointees from firing civil servants, removing civil servants from the influences of political patronage and partisan behavior. President Arthur and succeeding Presidents continued to expand the authority of the Civil Service Commission and federal departments that the Civil Service was covered. The Civil Service Commission, in addition to reducing patronage, also alleviated the burdensome task of the president of the United States in appointing federal office seekers.

Under the Commission Model, policy making and administrative powers were given to semi-independent commission rather than to the president. Reformers believed that a commission formed outside of the president’s chain of command would ensure that civil servants would be selected on the basis of merit system and the career service would operate in a politically neutral fashion. Civil Service Commissions typically consisted of three to seven individuals appointed by the chief executive on a bipartisan basis and for limited terms. Commissioners were responsible for direct administration of personnel system, including rule-making authority, administration of merit examinations, and enforcement of merit rules.

=== Official Register ===
In 1933, the Commission assumed responsibility for the Official Register, the annual list of federal employees. This lasted until 1959, when the Register ceased publication.

=== 1953 Executive Order ===
On April 27, 1953, President Eisenhower issued Executive Order 10450, which banned gay men and lesbians from working for any agency of the federal government, including the United States Civil Service Commission. It was not until 1973 that a federal judge ruled that a person's sexual orientation alone could not be the sole reason for termination from federal employment, and not until 1975 that the United States Civil Service Commission announced that they would consider applications by gays and lesbians on a case by case basis.

=== 1978 reorganization ===
Effective January 1, 1979, functions of the commission were split between the Office of Personnel Management and the Merit Systems Protection Board under the provisions of Reorganization Plan No. 2 of 1978 (43 F.R. 36037, 92 Stat. 3783) and the Civil Service Reform Act of 1978. In addition, other functions were placed under jurisdiction of the Equal Employment Opportunity Commission (EEOC), the Federal Labor Relations Authority (FLRA) and the Office of Special Counsel (OSC).

== Commission Chairs ==
Name	Start	End	President
George Curtis	January 1, 1872	January 1, 1874	Ulysses S. Grant (1869–1877)
Dorman B. Eaton	March 9, 1883	November 1, 1885	Chester A. Arthur (1881–1885)
Alfred P. Edgerton	November 9, 1885	February 9, 1889	Grover Cleveland (1885–1889)
Charles Lyman	May 13, 1889	December 15, 1893	Benjamin Harrison (1889–1893)
John R. Procter	December 15, 1893	December 12, 1903	Grover Cleveland (1893–1897)
John R. Procter	December 15, 1893	December 12, 1903	William McKinley (1897–1901)
John R. Procter	December 15, 1893	December 12, 1903	Theodore Roosevelt (1901–1909)
John C. Black	January 17, 1904	June 10, 1913	Theodore Roosevelt (1901–1909)
John C. Black	January 17, 1904	June 10, 1913	William Taft (1909–1913)
John A. McIlhenny	June 12, 1913	February 28, 1919	Woodrow Wilson (1913–1921)
Martin A. Morrison	March 13, 1919	July 14, 1921	Woodrow Wilson (1913–1921)
John H. Bartlett	July 15, 1921	March 12, 1922	Warren G. Harding (1921–1923)
William C. Deming	March 1, 1923	February 6, 1930	Warren G. Harding (1921–1923)
William C. Deming	March 1, 1923	February 6, 1930	Calvin Coolidge (1923–1929)
William C. Deming	March 1, 1923	February 6, 1930	Herbert Hoover (1929–1933)
Thomas E. Campbell	July 11, 1930	c. 1933	Herbert Hoover (1929–1933)
Harry B. Mitchell	May 19, 1933	February 26, 1951	Franklin D. Roosevelt (1933–1945)
Harry B. Mitchell	May 19, 1933	February 26, 1951	Harry S. Truman (1945–1953)
Robert Ramspeck	March 16, 1951	December 31, 1952	Harry S. Truman (1945–1953)
Philip Young	March 23, 1953	February 11, 1957	Dwight D. Eisenhower (1953–1961)
Harris Ellsworth	April 18, 1957	February 28, 1959	Dwight D. Eisenhower (1953–1961)
Roger W. Jones	March 10, 1959	January 4, 1961	Dwight D. Eisenhower (1953–1961)
John Macy	March 6, 1961	January 18, 1969	John F. Kennedy (1961–1963)
John Macy	March 6, 1961	January 18, 1969	Lyndon Johnson (1963–1969)
Robert E. Hampton	January 18, 1969	c. 1977	Richard Nixon (1969–1974)
Robert E. Hampton	January 18, 1969	c. 1977	Gerald Ford (1974–1977)
Alan K. Campbell	January 2, 1979	January 20, 1981	Jimmy Carter (1977–1981)

== See also ==
- United States civil service
