= Federal Employees Pay Comparability Act of 1990 =

U.S. federal law for government employees

The Federal Employees Pay Comparability Act of 1990 or FEPCA (H.R. 5241, Pub. L. 101–509) is a United States federal law relating to the salaries for employees of the United States Government. In the 1980s, salaries for civil servants in the executive branch had fallen behind private sector pay. FEPCA was enacted to provide guidelines to achieve pay comparability between Federal and non-Federal jobs. FEPCA was enacted as Section 529 of the Treasury, Postal Service and General Government Appropriations Act, 1991 (Public Law 101-509, signed into law on 5 November 1990).

== FEPCA Provisions ==
The most far reaching provisions of the Act were to change the way pay is set for the General Schedule and to maintain comparability by locality. It also called for establishment of the following special pay plans: Senior Level (SL) employees (non-supervisory and non-managerial employees classified above grade 15 of the General Schedule), administrative law judges (AL), members of the Boards of Contract Appeals (CA), certain law enforcement officers, employees in the Senior Biomedical Research Service, and police of the Bureau of Engraving and Printing and the United States Mint. FEPCA also authorized recruitment and relocation bonuses and retention allowances in special situations as well. The Federal Salary Council was created to advise the President of the United States on implementing the FEPCA. A major feature of the Act, locality pay, is discussed below.

== Locality Pay ==
FEPCA provides for a two-part annual pay adjustment for General Schedule workers: an across-the-board pay adjustment and a locality pay adjustment that varies by pay locality. Locality pay may be extended by Executive Order to other pay plans outside the General Schedule. Employees receiving special rates for hard-to-fill positions receive the higher of their special salary rate or locality pay.

== Implementation of FEPCA ==
A common misconception is that the locality adjustments are determined according to cost of living fluctuations and other regional considerations. In fact, the adjustments are determined according to the cost of employment in a given area as measured by the Department of Labor's Employment Cost Index (ECI), which does not necessarily correlate to the better-known Consumer Price Index that tracks consumer prices. Both Republican and Democratic administrations have complained about the methodology used to compute locality adjustments and the projected cost of closing the pay gap (as determined by FEPCA) between Federal salaries and those in the private sector. As a result, FEPCA has never been fully implemented.

Although FEPCA provides for an automatic formula to determine the annual pay raise, this formula has been ignored due to the cost of implementation. The President has authority under FEPCA to submit an "alternative" pay plan with a lower raise than that called for by the FEPCA formula (or none at all) "if because of national emergency or serious economic conditions affecting the general welfare" [5 U.S.C. §5303(b)(1)]. In reality, the final pay raise has been decided by Congress, which may authorize higher or lower increases than what were originally requested by the President in his annual budget submissions.

== See also ==
- General Schedule
