= Federal Service Labor-Management Relations Statute =

US labor law for federal employees

The Federal Service Labor-Management Relations Statute (FSLMRS) (5 U.S.C. §§ 7101-7135) is a federal law which establishes collective bargaining rights for most employees of the federal government of the United States. It was established under Title VII of the Civil Service Reform Act of 1978.

== Origin and intent ==
The FLRA was adopted after President Jimmy Carter sought legislation to bring comprehensive reform to the civil service system and regularize federal labor relations. The statute consolidated the functions of the Federal Labor Relations Council and the Assistant Secretary of Labor for Labor-Management Relations into a newly established Federal Labor Relations Authority (FLRA), charged with overseeing union elections and protecting federal government employees' organizing and bargaining rights. One commentator suggested that the legislative negotiations that resulted in the FSLMRS "so muddied the content and intent of the new agency that no one knew what it was supposed to do or how it was supposed to do it." Over time, there were modifications in the coverage and responsibilities specified in the statute.

In passing the statute, Congress declared that it wished to encourage collective bargaining between federal employees and their employers. Congress declared that collective bargaining is "in the public interest" because, among other things, it "contributes to the effective conduct of public business" and "facilitates and encourages the amicable settlements of disputes between employees and their employers involving conditions of employment."

== Comparison with the National Labor Relations Act ==
With only a few major exceptions, it is patterned on the National Labor Relations Act (NLRA).

One important difference between the two laws is the scope of the authorized collective bargaining process. While private-sector employees are entitled to collectively bargain through a representative of their choosing with respect to wages, hours, benefits, and other working conditions, federal employees can collectively bargain with respect to personnel practices only. Thus, federal employees may not negotiate the following working conditions through their exclusive bargaining representative: wages, hours, employee benefits, and classifications of Jobs.

Another important difference is although the NLRA allows private sector employees to engage in "concerted action," like workplace strikes, the statute does not grant this right to federal employees. In fact, the statute specifically excludes from the definition of "employee" those persons who engage in a workplace strike. It specifies that it is an unfair labor practice for labor unions to call or participate in a strike or a work stoppage that interferes with the operation of a federal agency.

A third important difference is under the FSLMRS, it is an unfair labor practice for labor unions to call or participate in picketing that interferes with the operation of a federal agency; employee picketing under the statute may consist of "informational" picketing only. Under the NLRA, appropriate picketing is a right guaranteed to private sector employees. Picketing allowed by the statute must not disrupt the operations of the agency. It also may not occur while the employees are on duty.
