= President's Pay Agent =

The President's Pay Agent consists of the Secretary of Labor and the Directors of the Office of Management and Budget (OMB) and the Office of Personnel Management (OPM). The Pay Agent's responsibility, pursuant to 5 U.S.C. 5304(d), as amended, approves locality and pay adjustments for federal employees as recommended by the Federal Salary Council.
