= Employment cost index =

A graph of the United States Employment Cost Index from 2001 to August 2018.

The employment cost index (ECI) is a quarterly economic series detailing the changes in the costs of labor for businesses in the United States economy. The ECI is prepared by the Bureau of Labor Statistics (BLS), in the U.S. Department of Labor.

The Bureau of Labor Statistics publishes the Employment Cost Index quarterly as part of the National Compensation Survey. The index measures changes in employers' labor costs while holding the occupational and industrial composition of employment constant. It separately tracks wages and salaries and employer costs for employee benefits, and reports results for civilian workers, private-industry workers, and state and local government workers.

== Applications ==
It is a widely watched series by the financial sector but gets less press coverage than the more commonly quoted consumer price index (CPI), which is also prepared by the BLS. While the CPI is a measure of inflation in consumer prices, the ECI is vital as an indication of whether employment cost changes are rising or falling and so it measures inflation of wages, and employer-paid benefits. Former Chairman of the Federal Reserve Alan Greenspan said, "The Employment Cost Index is indispensable to understanding America's economy. It ensures the accuracy of the statistics on employers' compensation costs that we rely on for economic policy making and for successful business planning." In making decisions to adjust the prime interest rate, the Federal Reserve often cites shifts in the ECI as having an effect on its decision-making process. The index is also used in determining annual US government-employee salary adjustments by across-the-board General Schedule adjustments. National Compensation Survey – Employment Cost Trends produces quarterly indexes measuring change over time in labor costs (ECI) and quarterly data measuring level of average costs per hour worked (ECEC).
