= Official Register of the United States =

Official list of people employed by the US government

Official Register
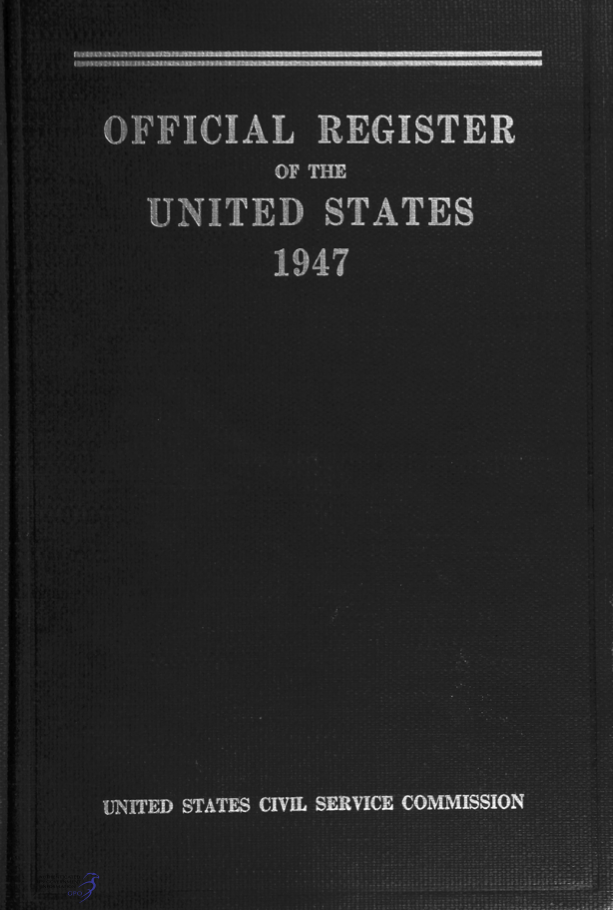
- Cover of the Official Register of the United States, 1947
- Type: List of federal employees
- Publisher: Civil Service Commission
- Founded: September 30, 1816
- Ceased publication: December 31, 1959
- Language: English
- Headquarters: United States
- OCLC number: 1049973821
- Free online archives: GPO

The Official Register of the United States was a regular publication which listed the names and roles of federal employees. It was first published in 1816 by the Department of State, and continued to be issued until 1959. With the exception of the missing years 1923 and 1935, the Register was published biennially until 1925. After that, the frequency increased to annually. The information about each employee varied over time, but could include their state or country of birth, salary, and the location of their post. As the federal government grew, later volumes of the Register only published information about higher-level administrators and supervisors.

== History ==
An act of Congress on April 27, 1816 (3 Stat. 342), required the Department of State to produce a biennial register of the names of all U.S. civil employees, military and naval officers, and agents. In addition, the secretary of the Navy provided for the publication of the names, force, and condition of all ships and vessels belonging to the United States, including when and where they were built. A subsequent act of July 14, 1832 (4 Stat. 608), required the Official Register to include government printers, a statement of monetary allowances to mail contractors, and correct lists of all presidents, cashiers, and directors of the Bank of the United States and its branches.

Intended to make the federal government more accountable to the general public, the Official Register published pertinent information about the federal workforce, including the name of every employee, job title, state or country of birth, the location of the employee’s post, and annual salary. The military lists provided the names of officers, their rank, and place of birth, while the naval lists also included date of commission and current duty station. An act of March 3, 1851, inserted the state or territory from which each employee was appointed. The Department of State compiled the Official Register until 1861; responsibility then moved to the Department of the Interior. In 1906 (for the 1907 edition) the Bureau of the Census assumed oversight, followed by the Civil Service Commission in 1933. The federal government ceased publication of the Official Register in 1959.

== Postal employees ==
From 1879 to 1911, the Official Register was published in two volumes, due to the ever-expanding size of the Post Office (postal employees in Washington, D.C.) and Postal Service (all other postal employees). Information included the location of post offices, the names of postmasters and other postal employees, and a great deal of information about the various contractors and divisions of the agency. After 1911, the Official Register ceased publication of the Postal Service information.
