= USAJobs =

Employment website of the United States federal government

- USAJobs logo
- Website type: Job search
- Available in: English
- Owner: United States Office of Personnel Management
- Website: www.usajobs.gov
- Commercial: No
- Registration: Optional
- Current status: Active

USAJobs (styled USAJOBS) is the United States government's website for listing civil service job opportunities with federal agencies. Federal agencies use USAJOBS to host job openings and match qualified applicants to those jobs. USAJOBS serves as the central place to find opportunities in hundreds of federal agencies and organizations. The site is operated by the United States Office of Personnel Management (OPM). It was created in 1996.

Many seeking employment through this system have encountered significant barriers, and the hiring process has proven opaque and is driven principally through keyword algorithms rather than through human evaluation of job qualifications. However, OPM and USAJOBS claim that resumes are primarily reviewed by human HR specialists at various agencies with some automated matching as part of a larger contextual review.

== See also ==
- Employment website
