= Federal Wage System =

The Federal Wage System (FWS) in the United States was developed to make the pay of federal blue-collar workers comparable to prevailing private sector rates in each local wage area. The FWS is a partnership worked out between the Office of Personnel Management (OPM), other Federal agencies, and labor organizations.

== History ==
Before the FWS, there was no central authority to establish wage equity for Federal trade, craft, and laboring employees. In 1965, President Lyndon B. Johnson ordered the former Civil Service Commission to work with Federal agencies and labor organizations to study the different agency systems and combine them into a single wage system that would be sensible and just. President Johnson called for common job-grading standards and wage policies and practices that would ensure interagency equity in wage rates. He established two basic principles for these policies and practices: Wages will be set according to local prevailing rates, and; there will be equal pay for equal work and pay distinctions in keeping with work distinctions.

Congress established the FWS by law in 1972. It created a joint labor-management Federal Prevailing Rate Advisory Committee (FPRAC) with an independent Chairman. Agencies and labor unions are members of the Committee. FPRAC studies all matters pertaining to prevailing rate determinations and advises the Director of the OPM on appropriate pay policies for FWS employees.

== Purpose ==
The goal of the system is to pay employees according to local prevailing rates. The regular pay plan covers most trade, craft, and laboring employees in the executive branch. The FWS does not cover United States Postal Service employees, legislative branch employees, or employees of private sector contracting firms. Special pay plans cover certain employees in special circumstances. The OPM authorizes special pay plans when unusual labor market conditions seriously handicap agencies in recruiting and retaining qualified employees.

== Procedure ==
OPM prescribes basic policies and procedures to ensure uniform pay-setting. OPM specifies procedures for agencies to design and conduct wage surveys, to construct wage schedules, to grade levels of work, and to administer basic and premium pay for employees.

To issue common job-grading standards for major occupations, OPM occupational specialists follow specific steps to develop new standards and to update existing standards. They make full occupational studies, which include onsite visits to interview employees, supervisors, and union representatives. Specialists write standards and ask agencies and unions for comments that are carefully considered and, where appropriate, incorporated into final job-grading standards. Federal agencies are required to apply these standards.

OPM defines the geographic boundaries of individual local wage areas and reviews survey job descriptions to ensure that they are accurate and current. In addition, OPM works with agencies and unions to schedule annual local wage surveys in each wage area.

Wage adjustments become effective in accordance with what is commonly referred to as the 45-day law. This law states that the Government has 45 working days to put FWS pay adjustments into effect after each wage survey starts. Wage schedules are effective with the first pay period after the 45-day period expires. The United States Department of Defense (DOD) is the lead agency responsible for issuing FWS wage schedules.

For each wage area, OPM identifies a "lead" agency. The "lead" agency is responsible for conducting wage surveys, analyzing data, and issuing wage schedules under the policies and procedures prescribed by OPM. All agencies in a wage area pay their hourly wage employees according to the wage schedules developed by the lead agency.

OPM has identified the Department of Defense as the lead agency for each local wage area. OPM does not conduct local wage surveys.

== Labor unions ==
Labor organizations play an important role in the wage determination process by providing representatives at all levels of the wage determination process. The employee unions having the greatest number of wage employees under exclusive recognition designate two of the five members of a lead agency's national level wage committee. Locally, the union with the most employees under exclusive recognition in a wage area designates one of the three members of each Local Wage Survey Committee. In addition, labor organizations nominate half of the Federal employees who collect wage data from private enterprise employers. A partnership team of one labor data collector and one management data collector visits each surveyed employer.

Under the FWS, each employer bases pay on what private industry is paying for comparable levels of work in a given local wage area. Employees are paid the full prevailing rate at step 2 of each grade level. Step 1, the lowest step in the FWS, is 4 percent below the prevailing rate of pay. Steps 3, 4, & 5, are four, eight, & 12 percent above the prevailing rate of pay, respectively.

== Other systems ==
The General Schedule (GS) is a separate pay system covering most white-collar civilian Federal employees. Surveys of non-Federal employers, including State and local governments, determine the pay for GS employees. There are a number of other differences between the GS and FWS in terms of occupational coverage, geographic coverage, pay ranges, and pay adjustment cycles.
