= United States federal civil service =

Non-elected workforce of the US government

The United States federal civil service is the civilian workforce (i.e., non-elected and non-military public sector employees) of the United States federal government's departments and agencies. The federal civil service was established in 1871 (5 U.S.C. § 2101). U.S. state and local government entities often have comparable civil service systems that are modeled on the national system to varying degrees.

The U.S. civil service is managed by the Office of Personnel Management, which in December 2011 reported approximately 2.79 million civil servants employed by the federal government. This included employees in the departments and agencies run by any of the three branches of government (the executive branch, legislative branch, and judicial branch) and the over 600,000 employees of the U.S. Postal Service.

== Types of employees ==
There are three categories of U.S. federal employees:

- The competitive service includes the majority of civil service positions, meaning employees are selected based on merit after a competitive hiring process for positions that are open to all applicants.
- The Senior Executive Service (SES) is the classification for non-competitive, senior leadership positions filled by career employees or political appointments.
- The excepted service (also known as unclassified service) includes jobs with a streamlined hiring process, such as security and intelligence functions (e.g., the Central Intelligence Agency, Federal Bureau of Investigation, State Department, etc.), interns, foreign service professionals, doctors, lawyers, judges, and others. Agencies with excepted service authorities create their own hiring policies and are not subject to most appointment, pay, and classification laws.

=== Hiring authorities ===
A hiring authority is the law, executive order, regulation that allows an agency to hire a person into the federal civil service. In fiscal year 2014, there were 105 hiring authorities in use. The following were the top 20 hiring authorities used that year, which accounted for 91% of new appointments:

Description of the 20 hiring authorities most used in fiscal year 2014
Hiring authority	Service type	Number	Description
Competitive examining	Competitive	44,612	Vacancies open to the public and posted on USAJobs. Applicants ranked and selections made by category rating. Veterans' preference applies
Department of Veterans Affairs, Title 38	Excepted	30,240	Exclusively for Veterans Affairs to hire certain medical occupations.
Schedule A: Agency-specific Authority	Excepted	11,220	Allows agencies to meet a hiring need that has not been remedied by using competitive examining, with justification and OPM approval.
Defense National Guard technician	Excepted	11,143	Unique non-Title 5 hiring authority used strictly for appointment of National Guard technicians. Appointees maintain a dual status as both a federal employee and state national guard member.
Veterans Employment Opportunities Act	Competitive	11,011	Allows eligible veterans to apply for positions announced under merit promotion procedures when an agency accepts applications from outside its own workforce.
Other law, executive order, or regulation	Both	10,745	Authorities granted by law, executive order, or regulation for which no specific OPM-designated hiring authority code exists.
Pathways internship	Excepted	8,862	Targets students at qualifying educational institutions. Interns eligible to be noncompetitively converted to competitive service under specified conditions.
Temporary appointment, based on prior temporary federal service	Competitive	8,344	Allows agencies to noncompetitively reappoint former temporary employees (who have not already served the maximum time allowed) and noncompetitively appoint others eligible for certain career conditional appointments.
Veterans recruitment appointment	Excepted	7,733	Allows agencies to appoint eligible veterans up to the GS-11 or equivalent level without regard to competitive examining procedures. Appointees are converted to competitive service appointments after 2 years of satisfactory service.
Alternative Personnel System, Department of Agriculture	Competitive	6,630	Provides hiring flexibility exclusively to the Forest Service and the Agricultural Research Service.
Transportation Security Administration	Excepted	4,540	Provides hiring flexibility exclusively to the Transportation Security Administration.
Government-wide direct hire authority	Competitive	4,449	Allows agencies to fill positions OPM has determined have a severe candidate shortage or a critical hiring need. Public notice is required but not the application of veterans' preference or applicant rating and ranking.
Reinstatement	Competitive	3,624	Allows former eligible federal employees to reenter the competitive service without competing with the public.
Pathways Recent Graduates	Excepted	2,845	Targets individuals who have recently received a degree or certificate from a qualifying institution. After completion, eligible for non-competitive conversions to competitive service under specified conditions.
Federal Aviation Administration	Excepted	2,676	Provides hiring flexibility exclusively to the Federal Aviation Administration.
Schedule A: severe physical disabilities	Excepted	2,204	Allows agencies to appoint persons with severe physical disabilities. Allows for non-competitive conversion to competitive service after 2 years of satisfactory service.
Department of Defense expedited hiring authority	Competitive	2,080	Allows DOD to hire qualified candidates for certain acquisition and health care occupations using direct-hire procedures where DOD has determined a shortage of candidates or critical hiring needs.
Demonstration Project, Defense Lab	Both	2,032	Allows DOD to hire science and technology personnel at Research Labs with modification or waiver of some Title 5 provisions.
Schedule A: Temporary, less-than-full time positions, critical need	Excepted	1,688	Allows managers to meet a short-term critical hiring need to fulfill the mission of an agency for up to 30-days with one 30-day extension.
Schedule A, attorneys	Excepted	1,627	Enables agencies to hire attorneys because OPM cannot develop qualification standards or examine for attorney positions by law.

=== Pay systems ===
The pay system of the United States government civil service includes principally the General Schedule (GS) for white-collar employees, Federal Wage System (FWS) for blue-collar employees, Senior Executive System (SES) for Executive-level employees, Foreign Service Schedule (FS) for members of the Foreign Service and more than twelve alternate pay systems that are referred to as alternate or experimental pay systems, such as the first experimental system China Lake Demonstration Project. The current system began as the Classification Act of 1923 and was refined into law with the Classification Act of 1949.

These acts that provide the foundation of the current system have been amended through executive orders and through published amendments in the Federal Register that sets for approved changes in the regulatory structure of the federal pay system. The common goal among all pay systems is to provide equitable salaries to all involved workers regardless of system, group or classification. This is referred to as pay equity or "equal pay for equal work". Select careers in high demand may be subject to a special rate table, which can pay above the standard GS tables. These careers include certain engineering disciplines and patent examiners.

The General Schedule (GS) includes white collar workers at levels 1 to 15, most professional, technical, administrative, and clerical positions in the federal civil service. The Federal Wage System or Wage Grade (WG) schedule includes most federal blue-collar workers. In September 2004, 71% of federal civilian employees were paid under the GS. The remaining 29% were paid under the Federal Wage System for federal blue-collar civilian employees, the Senior Executive Service and the Executive Schedule for high-ranking federal employees, and the pay schedules for the United States Postal Service and the Foreign Service. Some federal agencies—such as the United States Securities and Exchange Commission, the Federal Reserve System, and the Federal Deposit Insurance Corporation—have their own unique pay schedules.

All federal employees in the GS system receive a base pay that is adjusted for locality. Locality pay varies, but is at least 15.95% of base salary in all parts of the United States. The following salary ranges represent the lowest and highest possible amounts a person can earn in base salary, without earning overtime pay or receiving a merit-based bonus. Actual salary ranges differ adjusted for increased locality pay. As of January 2025, all base salaries lie within the parameters of the following ranges:

Pay grade	GS-1	GS-2	GS-3	GS-4	GS-5	GS-6	GS-7	GS-8	GS-9	GS-10	GS-11	GS-12	GS-13	GS-14	GS-15
Lowest step (1)	$22,360	$25,142	$27,434	$30,795	$34,454	$38,407	$42,679	$47,265	$52,205	$57,489	$63,163	$75,706	$90,025	$106,382	$125,133
Highest step (10)	$27,970	$31,638	$35,660	$40,038	$44,786	$49,927	$55,486	$61,449	$67,865	$74,733	$82,108	$98,422	$117,034	$138,296	$162,672

In 2009, nineteen percent of federal employees earned salaries of $100,000 or more. The average federal worker's pay was $71,208, compared with $40,331 in the private sector, although under Office of Management and Budget Circular A-76, most menial or lower paying jobs have been outsourced to private contractors. In 2010, there were 82,034 workers, 3.9% of the federal workforce, making more than $150,000 annually, compared to 7,240 in 2005.

GS salaries are capped by law, so that they do not exceed the salary for Executive Schedule IV positions. The increase in civil servants making more than $150,000 resulted mainly from an increase in Executive Schedule salary approved during the Administration of George W. Bush, which raised the salary cap for senior GS employees slightly above the $150,000 threshold.

== Federal agencies ==
Civil service employees work in one of the 15 executive departments, or one of the independent agencies. A number of staff organizations are grouped into the Executive Office of the President, including the White House staff, the National Security Council, the Office of Management and Budget, the Council of Economic Advisers, the Office of the U.S. Trade Representative, the Office of National Drug Control Policy and the Office of Science and Technology Policy.

Independent agencies include the United States Postal Service (USPS), the National Aeronautics and Space Administration (NASA), the Central Intelligence Agency (CIA), the Environmental Protection Agency (EPA), and the United States Agency for International Development (USAID). There are government-owned corporations such as the Federal Deposit Insurance Corporation (FDIC) and the National Railroad Passenger Corporation (NRPC), more commonly known as Amtrak.

In March 2022, there were 392 federal agencies including 9 executive offices, 15 executive departments, 259 executive department sub-agencies and bureaus, 66 independent agencies, 42 boards, commissions, and committees, 11 quasi-official agencies.

=== Employment by agency ===
Federal Government executive branch civilian employment, except U.S. Postal Service, fiscal year 2016 (Employment in thousands)
	Worldwide	D.C.
Combined Total	2,096	173
Executive departments	1,923	132
Defense, total	738	16.5
Army	251	2
Navy	207	12
Air Force	169	0.5
Other defense	80	2
Veterans Affairs	373	8
Homeland Security	192	24
Treasury	92	9
Justice	117	
Agriculture	97	7
Interior	71	4
Health/Human Services (HHS)	87	4
Transportation	55	8
Commerce	46	3
Labor	16	5
Energy	15	5
State	13	10
Housing/Urban Dev (HUD)	8	3
Education	4	3
Selected independent agencies	173	41
Social Security Administration	64	0.2
NASA	17	1
Environmental Protection Agency	16	4
Securities and Exchange Commission	5	3
General Services Administration	12	4
Small Business Administration	4	0.8
Office of Personnel Management	5	2

In January 2009, about 2 million civilian workers were employed by the federal government, excluding, the postal service and defense.

The federal government is the nation's single largest employer. Although most federal agencies are based in the Washington, D.C. region, only about 16%, or about 288,000, of the federal government workforce is employed in this region.

== History ==
In 1789, the federal service employed approximately 300 individuals. By the end of the 19th century, it had reached 208,000. As a consequence of the First World War, this number rose to 900,000. Between the wars, the workforce fluctuated between 5–600,000. The one million mark was surpassed in the early 1940s. A record 3.3 million people worked for the federal civil service by 1945. This figure then receded to 2.1 million by October 1946.

In the early 19th century, positions in the federal government were held at the pleasure of the president—a person could be fired at any time.Most mechanics and laborers were per diem employees, paid by the day. The spoils system meant that jobs were used to support the American political parties. For example employment during the early years of the Washington Navy Yard vacancies for laborers mechanical and other skilled trade jobs were rarely publicly announced; instead they were typically filled through political connections, patronage, and personal influence. See 15 October 1808 letter from Secretary of the Navy Robert Smith to Captain Thomas Tingey Only on rare occasion would a dearth of skilled applicants require shipyard officers to place public notice in local newspapers.

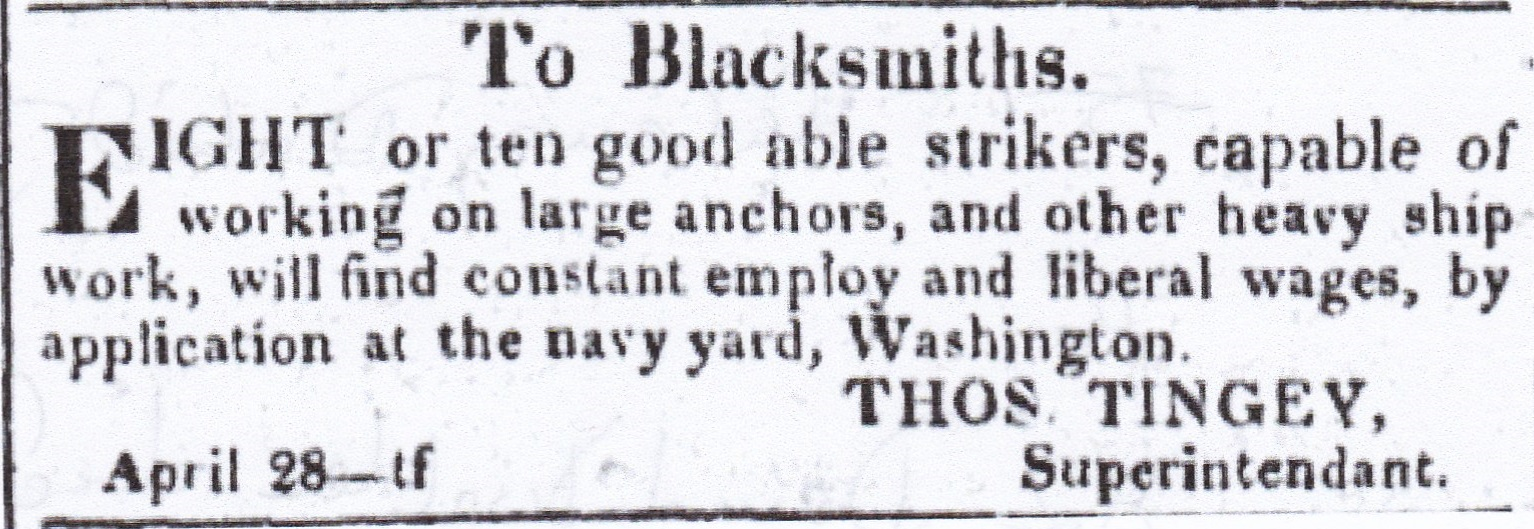
Notice placed by Commodore Thomas Tingey for Blacksmiths capable of working on large anchors, and other heavy ship work, dated 15 May 1815, City of Washington Gazette, p. 3.

In the 1840's and 1850's complaints at Brooklyn Navy Yard re apparent favoritism and blatant political patronage became public and were widely reported in the press. In October 1841, the Secretary of the Navy directed a Naval Court of Inquiry into the conduct of shipyard Commodore James Renshaw.

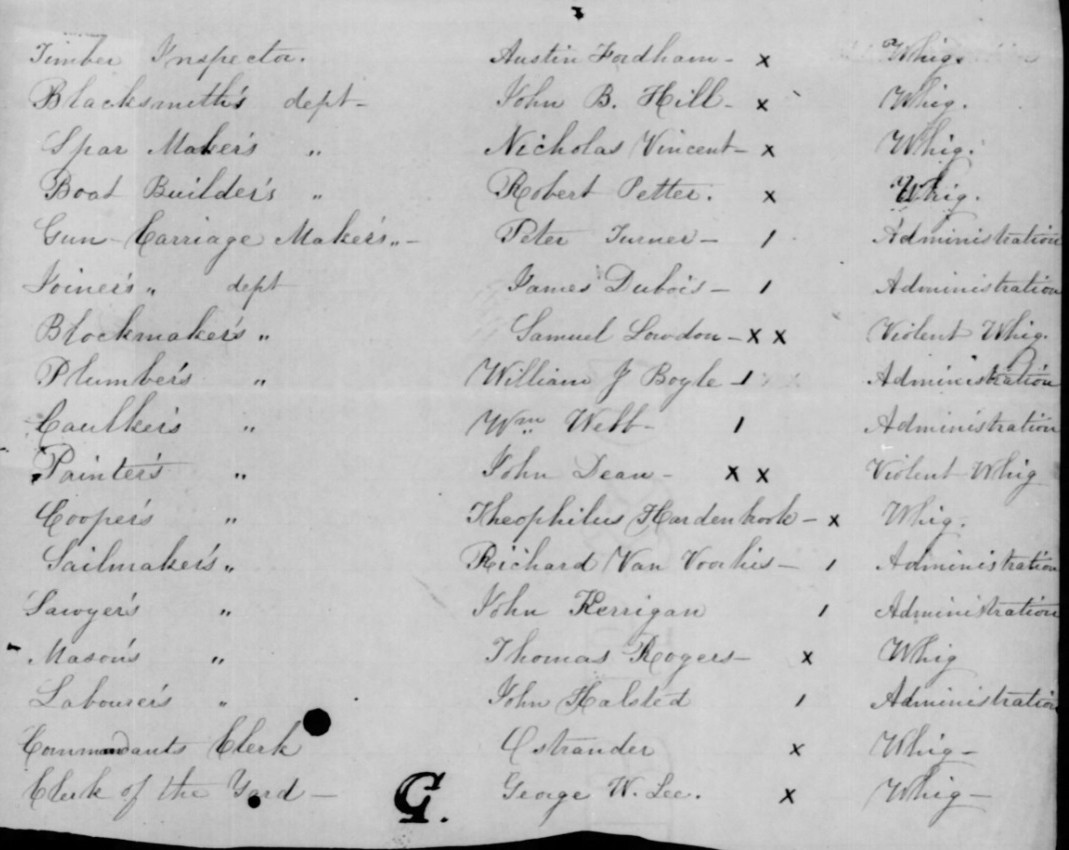
Commodore James Renshaw, Naval Court of Inquiry Oct 1841, Exhibit G

The complainants claimed Renshaw had engaged in political patronage and had threatened to remove long service employees for being members of the Whig Party on purely political grounds. They offered as evidence, a list of Brooklyn Navy Yard department heads purportedly compiled by the Commodore Renshaw with each employees name, and their supposed political affiliation. e.g "Administration" "Whig Party" and "Violent Whig". Those with a XX by their name were thought in eminent peril of removal. The Secretary of the Navy directed a Court of Naval Inquiry to investigate the complaints preferred by the department heads and employees. The Court concluded that Commodore Renshaw had erred and he was removed from command.

In 1859 Harpers Weekly published a widely read satirical sketch which mocked newly hired Brooklyn Navy Yard employees as part knaves, part fools all drunken, all ignorant of the duties required of workmen at the Navy Yard, but all capable of voting many time on election day..."

This was gradually changed by the Pendleton Civil Service Reform Act of 1883 and subsequent laws. By 1909, almost two-thirds of the U.S. federal workforce was appointed based on merit, that is, qualifications measured by tests.

From 1816 through 1959, the federal government published a list of employees called the Official Register. It started as a biennial list, and became yearly in 1925. As the number of employees grew, the Register eventually started listing only higher-level employees.

Certain senior civil service positions, including some heads of diplomatic missions and executive agencies, are filled by political appointees. Under the Hatch Act of 1939, civil servants are not allowed to engage in political activities while performing their duties. In some cases, an outgoing administration will give its political appointees positions with civil service protection in order to prevent them from being fired by the new administration; this is called "burrowing" in civil service jargon.

=== U.S. Civil Service Commission ===
Public support in the United States for civil service reform strengthened after the 1881 assassination of President James Garfield. In January 1883, the United States Civil Service Commission was created by the Pendleton Civil Service Reform Act. The commission was created to administer the civil service of the United States federal government. The law required federal government employees to be selected through competitive exams and basis of merit. What the Pendleton Act accomplished was the shift of power from the nearly absolute authority to hire and fire held by Foremen and Master Mechanics to a system of competition and merit.The use of impartial registers maintained by a board of Yard officers and the use of competitive examinations gradually removed blatant political manipulation and patronage. The Act also prevented elected officials and political appointees from firing civil servants, removing civil servants from the influences of political patronage and partisan behavior. The law did not apply to state and municipal governments. Effective January 1, 1978, the commission was renamed the Office of Personnel Management under the provisions of Reorganization Plan No. 2 of 1978 and the Civil Service Reform Act of 1978.

World War I, greatly increased the number of civil service positions at the military installations and naval shipyard. Under the necessities of wartime women were actively recruited to fill secretarial and clerical jobs. Typically, female Yeoman reservists performed clerical duties such as typing, stenography, bookkeeping, accounting, inventory control, and telephone operation. Because of the Washington Navy Yard and other naval installations such as the Naval Gun Factory expansion in size to meet production goals running twenty four hours each day and seven days a week Secretary of Navy Josephus Daniels, approved the creation of the Yeoman F (Female). This new rating, allowed thousands of women to volunteer for the first time for the wartime service. See thumbnail panoramic photo of Naval Gun Factory Clerical Employees with large number of Yeoman (F) and other female civilian employees. 1918 -1919.

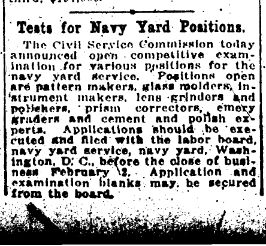
Civil Service Tests For Navy Yard Positions, Evening Star, 19 Jan 1920, p.22 re Civil Service Commission announcement for open competitive exams for pattern makers, glass molders, instrument makers, lens grinders, prism correctors etc

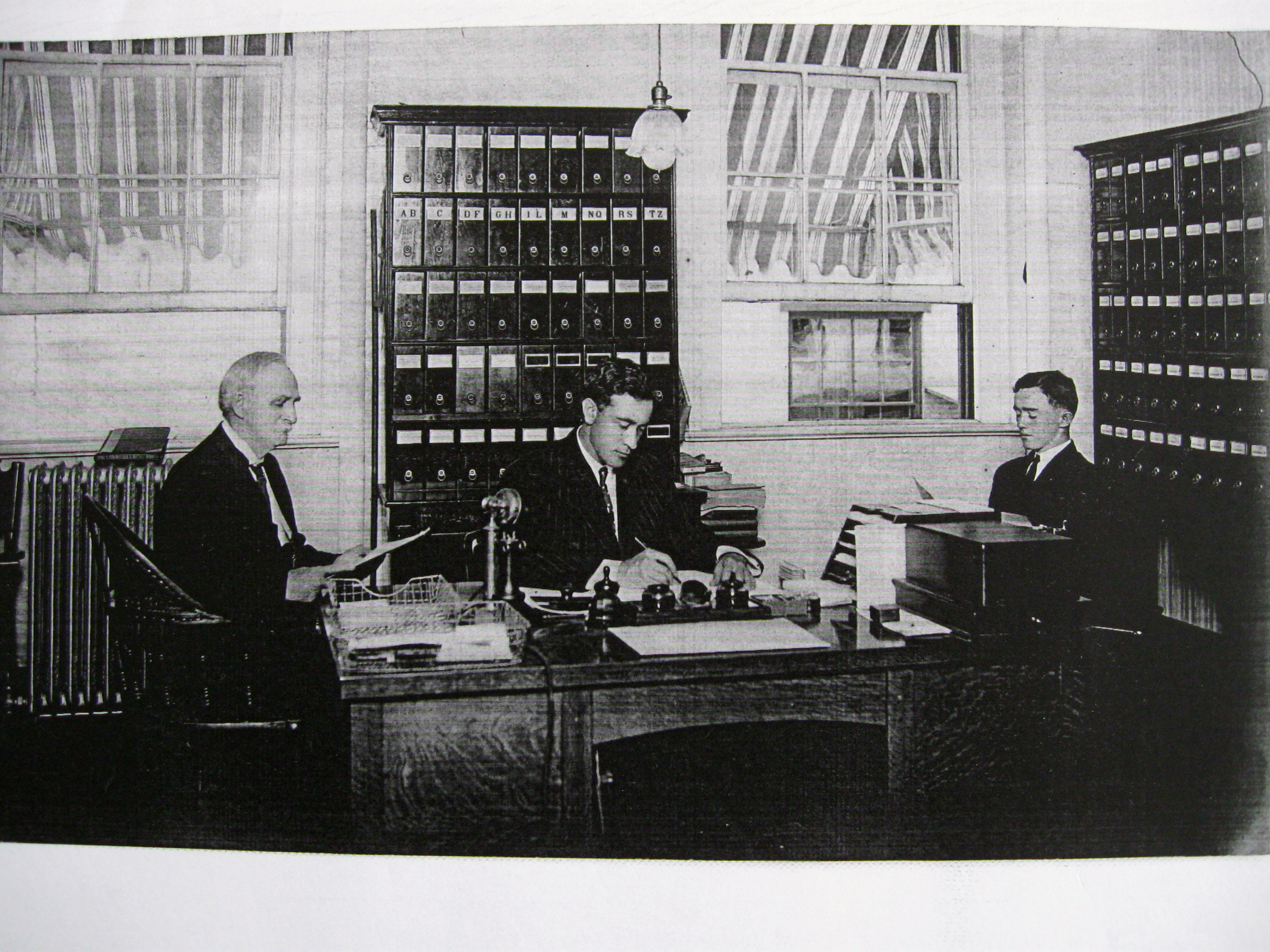
Washington Navy Yard ,Naval Gun Factory Labor Board 1912

=== Civil Service Reform Act of 1978 ===
The 1978 act abolished the United States Civil Service Commission and created the U.S. Office of Personnel Management (OPM), the Federal Labor Relations Authority (FLRA) and the U.S. Merit Systems Protection Board (MSPB). The OPM primarily provides management guidance to the agencies of the executive branch and issues regulations that control federal human resources.

The FLRA oversees the rights of federal employees to form collective bargaining units (unions) and to engage in collective bargaining with agencies. The MSPB conducts studies of the federal civil service and mainly hears the appeals of federal employees who are disciplined or otherwise separated from their positions. This act was an effort to replace incompetent officials.

=== Attempted reforms under the Trump administrations ===
During the Trump administrations, Trump frequently spread conspiracy theories that a "deep state" of government workers and Democrats in government were actively working against him and America, and promised to remove them when in power. To this end, he implemented a variety of attempted reforms to root out "disloyalty", which some described as an attempt to politicize the civil service and re-implement the spoils system.

==== First presidency ====
In May 2018, President Donald Trump signed three executive orders intended to crack down on unions that represent federal employees and to make it easier to fire federal workers. It was claimed that the changes are designed to strengthen merit-system principles in the civil service and improve efficiency, transparency, and accountability in the federal government.

In August 2018, after reviewing the executive orders in detail, U.S. District Court Judge Ketanji Brown Jackson temporarily struck down most of the executive orders, ruling that they were an attempt to weaken federal labor unions representing federal employees. Judge Jackson's ruling was reversed by the DC Circuit on jurisdiction grounds, saying the unions should first have complained to the Federal Labor Relations Authority.

In October 2020, Trump signed an executive order that created a new category of federal employees, Schedule F, which included all career civil servants whose job includes "policymaking". Such employees would no longer be covered by civil service protections against arbitrary dismissal, but would be subject to the same rules as political appointees. The new description could be applied to thousands of nonpartisan experts such as scientists, who give advice to the political appointees who run their departments. Heads of all federal agencies were ordered to report by January 19, 2021, a list of positions that could be reclassified as Schedule F. The Office of Management and Budget submitted a list in November that included 88 percent of the office's workforce.

Federal employee organizations and Congressional Democrats sought to overturn the order via lawsuits or bills. House Democrats warned in a letter that "The executive order could precipitate a mass exodus from the federal government at the end of every presidential administration, leaving federal agencies without deep institutional knowledge, expertise, experience, and the ability to develop and implement long-term policy strategies." Observers predicted that Trump could use the new rule to implement a "massive government purge on his way out the door". Schedule F was eliminated by President Joe Biden on 22, January 2021, nullifying the personnel changes.

==== Second presidency ====
In January 2025, the second Trump administration, with the aid of the newly established Department of Government Efficiency chaired by Elon Musk, sent a memo offering deferred resignation to all roughly two million federal employees, of which around 75,000 accepted. Mass layoffs began in February of approximately 30,000 federal employees.

In May 2025, the Trump administration unveiled federal hiring guidance (known as the Merit Hiring Plan) limiting resumé length to two pages and requiring applicants to write essays affirming their commitment to the Constitution, Trump’s executive orders, and government efficiency. In July 2025, OPM told agencies to deemphasize the essay asking applicants to praise a Trump executive order following a legal challenge.

== Civil servants in literature ==
- Bogy, Lewis Vital (1891). In Office; a Story of Washington Life and Society. The Ariel Library. Extra no., B. Chicago: F. J. Schulte & Company. A novel of the social ambience surrounding a young female Patent Office clerk
- Bromell, Henry (2001). Little America: A Novel. New York: Alfred A. Knopf. ISBN 978-0-525-10425-4. A State Department employee's son reconstructs a childhood in a fictional Middle Eastern country
- Bushell, Agnes (1997). The enumerator. London: Serpent's Tail. ISBN 978-1-85242-554-8. A novel about a public health contractor in San Francisco
- Costello, Mark (2002). Big If. New York: W.W. Norton & Co. ISBN 978-0-393-05116-2. A novel of life in the Secret Service
- Keeley, Edmund (1985). A Wilderness Called Peace. New York: Simon and Schuster. ISBN 978-0-671-47416-4. A novel of a diplomat's son in Cambodia
- McInnis, Kathleen J. (2018). The Heart of War: Misadventures in the Pentagon. Post Hill Press. p. 277. ISBN 978-1682616512. The Devil Wears Prada meets Catch-22; a novel about a young woman's journey into the heart of Washington's war machine.
- Mumms, Hardee (1977). Federal Triangle. New York: Dutton. ISBN 978-0-525-10425-4. Humorous novel of 1970s federal employees in Washington, DC
- Philipson, Morris H (1983). Secret understandings: A novel. New York: Simon & Schuster. ISBN 978-0-671-46619-0. Novel about the wife of a federal judge
- White, Stewart Edward (1910). The Rules of the Game. New York: Doubleday. ISBN 978-1-4432-2300-3. A novel of the Forest Service

== See also ==
- Government employees in the United States
- List of United States federal agencies
- Category:Civil service in the United States
- Curtis Douglas vs. Veterans Administration

== Bibliography ==
- Ogg, Frederic A.; Ray, P. Orman (1947). "The Executive Civil Service". Essentials of American Government (5th ed.). Appleton-Century-Crofts.
