= Civil Service Reform Act of 1978 =

United States legislation

- Long title: An Act to reform the civil service laws.
- Enacted by: the 95th United States Congress
- Effective: October 13, 1978

Citations
- Public law: 95-454
- Statutes at Large: 92 Stat. 1111

Codification
- Titles amended: Title 5—Government Organization and Employees
- U.S.C. sections created: 5 U.S.C. ch. 11

Legislative history
- Introduced in the Senate as S. 2640 by Abraham A. Ribicoff (D–CT) on March 3, 1978; Committee consideration by Senate Governmental Affairs; Passed the Senate on August 24, 1978 (87-1); Reported by the joint conference committee on October 4, 1978; agreed to by the Senate on October 4, 1978 (agreed) and by the House on October 6, 1978 (365-8); Signed into law by President Jimmy Carter on October 13, 1978

United States Supreme Court cases
- United States v. Fausto, 484 U.S. 439 (1988); Elgin v. Department of Treasury, 567 U.S. 1 (2012); Kloeckner v. Solis, 568 U.S. 41 (2012); Ohio Adjutant General's Department v. Federal Labor Relations Authority, No. 21-1454, 598 U.S. ___ (2023)

The Civil Service Reform Act of 1978 (CSRA) reformed the civil service of the United States federal government, partly in response to the Watergate scandal (1972-74). The Act abolished the U.S. Civil Service Commission and distributed its functions primarily among three new agencies: the Office of Personnel Management (OPM), the Merit Systems Protection Board (MSPB), and the Federal Labor Relations Authority (FLRA).

== History ==
The original legislation allowing federal employees to organize together and protect rights was the Lloyd–La Follette Act in 1912. However this act only allowed for employees to unionize together and petition the government, but gave them no real bargaining power. The Act was amended by both President John F. Kennedy (Executive Order 10988) and President Richard Nixon (Executive Order 11491), but neither executive orders truly fixed the problems with the original act. By the time President Jimmy Carter took office in 1977, the Lloyd-LaFollette Act was perceived as entirely obsolete and forced the necessity of legislative reform. With the American public wary of the organization of government following Watergate and the OPEC embargo, Carter's time in office coincided with a period in which bureaucratic organization was open to "reexamination". Carter ran his campaign promising to "strengthen presidential control over federal services", and once in office created the CSRA. Carter intended for the act to create more bureaucratic officials involved with policy making (rather than administration) and that were more closely politically controlled by the presidency. The CSRA arose from a growing wariness of the United States Government by the general American population. Preceding the Act in 1978 was nearly a decade of major blunders committed by the White House. In short, the federal government had "widely over-promised and woefully underperformed". Incidents like the Watergate scandal coupled with the consensus public opinion of the Vietnam War being a complete failure led the push for reform. The CSRA sought to fix common problems across the public sector such as eliminating manipulation of the merit system without inhibiting the entire structure, how to both invest authority in managers while simultaneously protecting employee from said authority, limit unnecessary or excessive spending, and make the federal work force mirror the American people more closely.

== Drafting ==
The CSRA was the first federally passed comprehensive civil service reform since the Pendleton Act of 1883. Leading up to the passing of the CSRA, the federal government grew in both size and complexity, causing the public to question the government’s cost and blame policy failures on the bureaucrats.

In March, President Jimmy Carter sent a proposal to Congress to bring about civil service reform in order to “bring efficiency and accountability to the Federal Government.” Congress spent 7 months forming and enacting the legislation and in August 1978, Congress approved the plan that restructured federal personnel management.

== Description ==
The Civil Service Reform Act of 1978 created rules and procedures for federal civilian employees. There were two parts to the reform; The Reorganization Plan and the Civil Service Reform Act. The Reorganization Plan divided the Civil Service Commission (CSC) into the Office of Personnel Management (OPM) and the Merit Systems Protection Board (MSPB). Additionally, the Federal Labor Regulations Authority (FLRA) was created.

The agency responsibilities are:

- OPM provides management guidance to agencies of the executive branch and issues regulations that control federal human resources.
- The MSPB conducts studies of the federal civil service and hears appeals of federal employees who have been disciplined or otherwise separated from their positions. Personnel actions which discriminate among employees based on marital status, political activity, or political affiliation are prohibited by the CSRA. Federal employees may file complaints regarding possible violations of this rule with the Office of Special Counsel, which was created as a subunit of the MSPB.
- FLRA oversees the rights of federal employees to form collective bargaining units (unions) to bargain with agencies. The CSRA imposes standards on the officers of those unions which are enforced by the Office of Labor-Management Standards in the U.S. Department of Labor.

In addition to the creation of new agencies, a new grade classification for the government’s top managers was created - the Senior Executive Service (SES). These managers were strategically positioned throughout the government and were rewarded via bonuses based on merit. Middle managers were now paid and rewarded based on evaluations and merit only. The act also created processes for firing employees found to be incompetent and provided protection for "whistleblowers".

== Effects ==
The CSRA was one of the largest reforms in Federal personnel regulations since the Pendleton Civil Service Reform Act of 1883 and is one of the Carter Administration's major domestic achievements. However, the early views of academics on the long-term effects of the CSRA have been varied. A 1982 article reported the views of some political scientists that the CSRA had not affected unequal hiring methods, had not formed a division of experienced administrators, and was ignored by certain agencies. A 1984 article claimed that the CSRA was a pervasive attempt to reform and restrain a large government bureaucracy in the United States. A 2006 article claimed that the CSRA has incorporated "long-lasting strategies based on improved responsiveness and competitiveness of federal employees" and that the act moderately improved employee attitudes in the workplace. A 2008 article claimed that many provisions in the CSRA have spread globally and that the act has had a serious impact on public administration systems all over the world. Some agencies, like the Volcker Alliance, have called for further civil reform that would amend the CSRA. In 2025, President Donald Trump proposed civil service legislation meant to "[get] rid of all the cancer", which threatened to override the CSRA.

== See also ==
- Federal Service Labor-Management Relations Statute (Title VII of the Civil Service Reform Act of 1978)

== Sources ==
- Barnes, Robert (2012-06-11). "Fired federal employees have limited route for challenging dismissals". The Washington Post.
- Pfiffner, James P.; Brook, Douglas A. (2000). The Future of Merit: Twenty Years After the Civil Service Reform Act. Washington, D.C.: Woodrow Wilson Center Press. ISBN 0-8018-6465-8.
- Foster, Gregory D. (January–February 1979). "The 1978 Civil Service Reform Act: Post-Mortem or Rebirth?". Public Administration Review. 39 (1): 78–86. doi:10.2307/3110383. JSTOR 3110383.
- Ingraham, Patricia W.; Rosenbloom, David H., eds. (1992). The Promise and Paradox of Civil Service Reform. University of Pittsburgh Press. ISBN 9780822974550.
- Lynn, Naomi B.; Vaden, Richard E. (July–August 1979). "Bureaucratic Response to Civil Service Reform". Public Administration Review. 39 (4): 333–343. doi:10.2307/976210. JSTOR 976210.
