= Plum Book =

U.S. government publication

United States Government Policy and Supporting Positions (Plum Book)
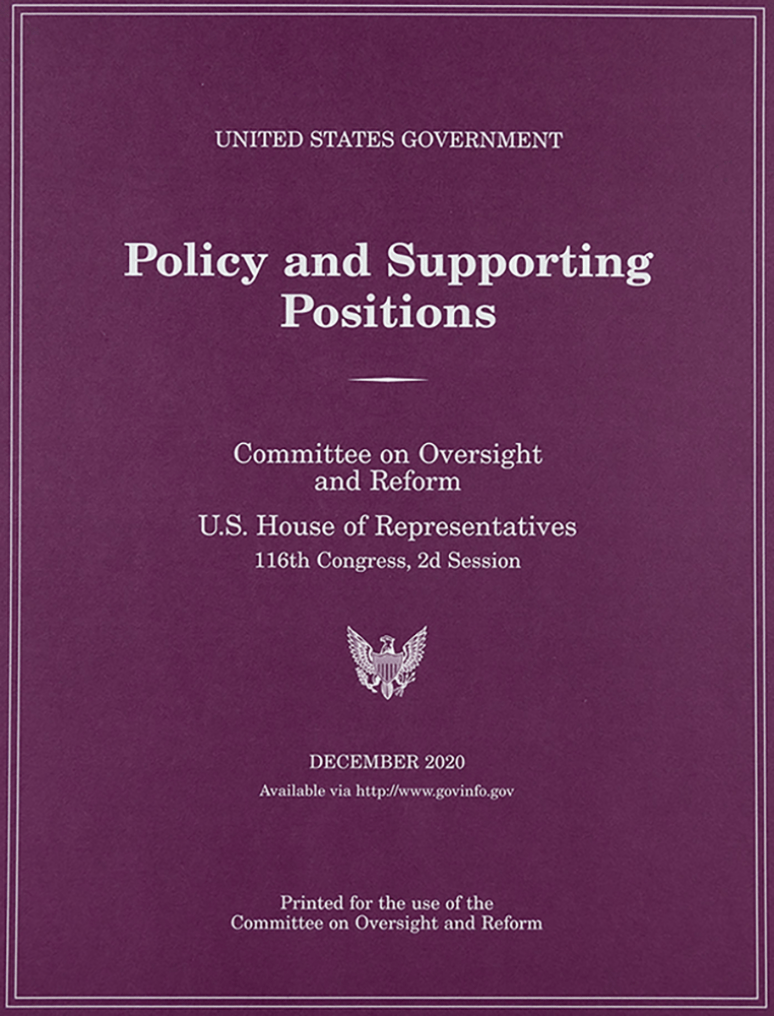
- 116th Congress, 2d Session, December 2020
- Author: Committee on Oversight and Reform
- Working title: Plum book
- Language: English
- Subject: Political Reference
- Genre: Non-fiction
- Publisher: Superintendent of Documents, U.S. Government Publishing Office, United States Government Printing Office
- Publication place: United States of America
- Website: https://www.govinfo.gov

United States Government Policy and Supporting Positions (more commonly referred to as the Plum Book) is a book that lists positions in the United States government that are subject to political appointment. It lists around 8,000 federal civil service leadership and support positions in the legislative and executive branches of the federal government that may be subject to non-competitive appointment nationwide. It is a publication of the United States Senate's Committee on Governmental Affairs and the House of Representatives' Committee on Government Reform. A new edition is published every four years after each presidential election. All tenured positions commissioned by the president are published, including all officers of the United States, their immediate subordinates, policy executives and advisors, and aides who report to these officials. Some positions are kept secret and not published due to being classified via executive privilege.

== History ==
The Plum Book originated in 1952 during the Eisenhower administration to identify presidentially appointed positions within the federal government. For twenty years, the Democratic Party had controlled the federal government. When President Eisenhower took office, the Republican Party requested a list of government positions that the new president could fill. The next edition of the Plum Book appeared in 1960 and has since been published every four years, just after a presidential election.

Older editions of the Plum Book are held by any federal depository library. The Government Printing Office (now the United States Government Publishing Office) began to make the Plum Book available as an app for the first time in December 2012. The 2020 edition was published on December 1, 2020.

Plum Books are considered an important resource for presidents-elect of the United States during their presidential transitions, aiding them in identifying federal government positions to which they can name appointees.

== Number of appointments by agency ==
As of December 2020, there are 7,935 political appointments across the executive and legislative branches of the U.S. federal government. Many of these positions must be filled by the incoming president every four years while others are career appointments that outlast presidential administrations.

These positions are published in the Plum Book, a new edition of which is released after each United States presidential election. The list is provided by the U.S. Office of Personnel Management (OPM).

=== Key ===
Abbreviations for type of appointment
CA	Career Appointment
NA	Noncareer Appointment
PA	Presidential Appointment (without Senate Confirmation)
PAS	Presidential Appointment with Senate Confirmation
SC	Schedule C Excepted Appointment
TA	Limited Term Appointment
XS	Appointment Excepted by Statute
SES	Senior Executive Service

=== Executive branch – departments ===
	Type of appointment								
Department	CA	NA	PA	PAS	SC	TA	XS	SES	Total
Department of Agriculture	130	46	3	14	157	1	1	147	499
Department of Commerce	83	36	1	23	96	7	3	101	350
Department of Defense – Department of the Air Force	16	3	0	7	5	0	1	13	45
Department of Defense – Department of the Army	29	10	0	8	10	6	1	9	73
Department of Defense – Department of the Navy	11	1	0	7	4	0	0	16	39
Department of Defense – Office of the Secretary of Defense	211	58	1	44	95	9	0	55	473
Department of Education	35	21	1	16	72	1	1	14	161
Department of Energy	133	25	0	23	123	1	1	29	335
Department of Health and Human Services	237	78	2	19	92	11	1	74	514
Department of Homeland Security	84	56	4	18	72	9	161	46	450
Department of Housing and Urban Development	44	23	1	13	81	4	0	111	277
Department of Justice	96	57	8	219	60	6	1	44	491
Department of Labor	32	23	2	16	108	0	0	15	196
Department of State	130	36	3	256	86	2	2	10	525
Department of the Interior	158	35	0	18	42	0	4	54	311
Department of the Treasury	92	25	3	35	33	3	0	46	237
Department of Transportation	136	41	2	18	61	1	4	30	293
Department of Veterans Affairs	281	16	3	12	12	9	147	77	557
Total	1938	590	34	766	1209	70	328	891	5826

=== Independent agencies and government corporations ===
	Type of appointment								
Agency	CA	NA	PA	PAS	SC	TA	XS	SES	Total
Advisory Council on Historic Preservation	0	0	10	1	0	0	0	0	11
African Development Foundation	0	0	0	5	0	0	0	0	5
American Battle Monuments Commission	0	0	1	0	0	0	0	0	1
Appalachian Regional Commission	0	0	0	2	2	0	0	0	4
Arctic Research Commission	1	0	7	1	0	0	0	0	9
Armed Forces Retirement Home	0	0	2	0	0	0	0	0	2
Barry Goldwater Scholarship and Excellence in Education Foundation	0	1	0	1	0	0	0	0	2
Central Intelligence Agency	0	0	0	3	0	0	0	0	3
Chemical Safety and Hazard Investigation Board	2	0	0	4	0	0	0	3	9
Christopher Columbus Fellowship Foundation	0	0	13	0	0	0	0	0	13
Commission of Fine Arts	1	0	7	0	0	0	0	0	8
Commission on Civil Rights	0	1	7	0	5	0	4	6	23
Committee for Purchase From People Who Are Blind Or Severely Disabled	0	0	2	0	0	0	0	0	2
Commodity Futures Trading Commission	0	0	0	5	9	0	0	0	14
Consumer Financial Protection Bureau	0	0	0	1	0	0	0	0	1
Consumer Product Safety Commission	4	0	0	6	9	0	0	4	23
Corporation for National and Community Service	0	0	0	17	0	0	18	0	35
Council of Inspectors General on Integrity and Efficiency	2	0	0	0	0	0	0	0	2
Court Services and Offender Supervision Agency for the District of Columbia	1	0	0	1	0	0	0	0	2
Defense Nuclear Facilities Safety Board	2	0	0	5	0	0	1	0	8
Delaware River Basin Commission	0	0	1	0	0	0	0	0	1
Delta Regional Authority	0	0	1	1	0	0	0	0	2
Denali Commission	0	0	0	0	0	0	1	0	1
Dwight D. Eisenhower Memorial Commission	0	0	0	0	0	0	1	0	1
Environmental Protection Agency	88	30	0	13	62	0	0	15	208
Equal Employment Opportunity Commission	13	2	0	6	1	0	0	8	30
Export-Import Bank	0	0	0	6	23	0	0	0	29
Farm Credit Administration	0	0	0	3	3	0	0	0	6
Federal Communications Commission	42	1	0	5	0	0	6	5	59
Federal Deposit Insurance Corporation	0	0	0	4	2	0	0	0	6
Federal Election Commission	0	0	0	6	0	0	19	0	25
Federal Energy Regulatory Commission	44	1	0	5	4	0	0	3	57
Federal Housing Finance Agency	0	0	0	1	1	0	0	0	2
Federal Housing Finance Board	0	0	0	0	3	0	0	0	3
Federal Labor Relations Authority	0	0	7	4	0	0	2	0	13
Federal Maritime Commission	2	0	0	5	2	0	0	1	10
Federal Mediation and Conciliation Service	3	0	0	0	0	0	1	1	5
Federal Mine Safety and Health Review Commission	1	0	0	6	3	0	0	3	13
Federal Permitting Improvement Steering Council	0	1	0	0	2	0	0	0	3
Federal Reserve System	0	0	0	7	0	0	0	0	7
Federal Retirement Thrift Investment Board	4	0	0	5	0	0	1	0	10
Federal Trade Commission	25	5	0	5	4	1	0	11	51
General Services Administration	14	19	0	2	16	2	0	5	58
Great Lakes Fishery Commission	0	0	5	0	0	0	0	0	5
Gulf Coast Ecosystem Restoration Council	1	0	0	0	0	0	0	2	3
Harry S. Truman Scholarship Foundation	0	0	0	0	0	0	0	1	1
Institute of Museum and Library Services	1	0	0	19	0	0	0	6	26
Intellectual Property Enforcement Coordinator	1	0	0	1	0	0	0	0	2
Interagency Council on the Homeless	0	0	0	0	0	0	1	0	1
Inter-American Foundation	0	0	0	10	0	0	0	0	10
International Boundary and Water Commission	0	0	2	0	0	0	0	0	2
International Joint Commission	0	0	0	3	0	0	0	0	3
Interstate Commission on the Potomac River Basin	0	0	4	0	0	0	0	0	4
James Madison Memorial Fellowship Foundation	0	0	0	0	0	0	1	0	1
Japan–United States Friendship Commission	1	0	0	0	0	0	0	0	1
Marine Mammal Commission	0	0	0	3	0	0	0	0	3
Medicaid and Chip Payment and Access Commission	0	0	0	0	0	0	22	0	22
Medicare Payment Advisory Commission	0	0	0	0	0	0	3	0	3
Merit Systems Protection Board	1	1	0	3	1	0	0	4	10
Millennium Challenge Corporation	0	0	26	5	0	0	0	0	31
Morris K. Udall Scholarship and Excellence in National Environmental Policy Foundation	0	0	0	9	0	0	0	0	9
National Aeronautics and Space Administration	30	4	0	4	13	1	0	5	57
National Archives and Records Administration	0	0	0	1	0	0	13	0	14
National Capital Planning Commission	0	0	3	0	0	0	0	0	3
National Council on Disability	0	0	8	0	0	0	0	0	8
National Credit Union Administration	0	0	0	3	9	0	0	0	12
National Endowment for the Arts	0	3	0	0	11	0	0	6	20
National Endowment for the Humanities	5	1	0	1	5	0	0	11	23
National Labor Relations Board	9	5	0	6	2	0	0	13	35
National Mediation Board	1	0	0	5	0	0	0	1	7
National Science Foundation	46	0	0	2	0	3	24	40	115
National Transportation Safety Board	3	1	0	5	9	0	0	0	18
Northern Border Regional Commission	0	0	1	1	0	0	0	0	2
Nuclear Regulatory Commission	40	0	0	6	0	0	70	1	117
Nuclear Waste Technical Review Board	1	0	11	0	0	0	0	0	12
Occupational Safety and Health Review Commission	1	0	0	3	2	0	0	2	8
Office of Government Ethics	0	0	0	1	0	0	0	1	2
Office of Navajo and Hopi Indian Relocation	1	0	0	1	0	0	0	1	3
Office of Personnel Management	26	12	0	3	26	0	1	6	74
Office of Special Counsel	0	1	0	2	3	0	0	3	9
Office of the Secretary of Defense Office of the Inspector General	1	0	0	1	0	0	0	0	2
Peace Corps	0	0	26	4	0	0	0	0	30
Pension Benefit Guaranty Corporation	0	0	0	2	2	0	2	0	6
Postal Regulatory Commission	0	0	0	5	0	0	19	0	24
Public Buildings Reform Board	0	0	5	0	0	0	0	0	5
Railroad Retirement Board	0	0	0	4	0	0	0	0	4
Securities and Exchange Commission	0	0	0	5	12	0	0	0	17
Selective Service System	0	1	0	1	1	0	0	0	3
Small Business Administration	20	11	0	4	37	0	0	4	76
Smithsonian Institution	0	0	0	0	0	0	2	0	2
Social Security Administration	85	3	0	5	3	4	0	36	136
Surface Transportation Board	0	0	0	5	0	0	0	0	5
Tennessee Valley Authority	0	0	0	8	0	0	0	0	8
Trade and Development Agency	0	0	0	1	3	0	0	0	4
U.S. Agency for Global Media	7	0	0	1	0	0	0	3	11
United States–China Economic and Security Review Commission	0	0	0	0	0	0	12	0	12
United States Agency for International Development	16	4	1	12	0	1	87	5	126
United States Commission for the Preservation of America's Heritage Abroad	0	0	21	0	0	0	0	0	21
United States Commission on International Religious Freedom	0	0	3	0	0	0	6	0	9
United States Election Assistance Commission	0	0	0	4	0	0	2	0	6
United States Holocaust Memorial Council	0	0	1	0	0	0	2	0	3
United States Institute of Peace	0	0	0	12	0	0	0	0	12
United States International Development Finance Corporation	0	0	0	6	8	0	45	0	59
United States International Trade Commission	0	0	0	6	18	0	0	2	26
United States Postal Service	0	0	0	0	0	0	2	1	3
United States Semiquincentennial Commission	0	0	1	0	0	0	0	0	1
Vietnam Education Foundation	0	0	6	0	0	0	1	0	7
Women's Suffrage Centennial Commission	0	0	1	0	0	0	0	0	1
Woodrow Wilson International Center for Scholars	0	0	8	0	0	0	3	0	11
World War I Centennial Commission	0	0	3	0	0	0	1	0	4
Total	546	108	194	319	316	12	373	219	2087

== Legislative branch ==
	Type of appointment				
Agency	PA	PAS	SC	XS	Total
Architect of the Capitol	0	1	0	0	1
Government Accountability Office	0	2	0	0	2
Government Publishing Office	0	1	1	3	5
Library of Congress	10	1	0	3	14
Total	10	5	1	6	22

== See also ==
- List of positions filled by presidential appointment with Senate confirmation
- List of United States political appointments across party lines
