= Bruce J. Walker =

American lawyer

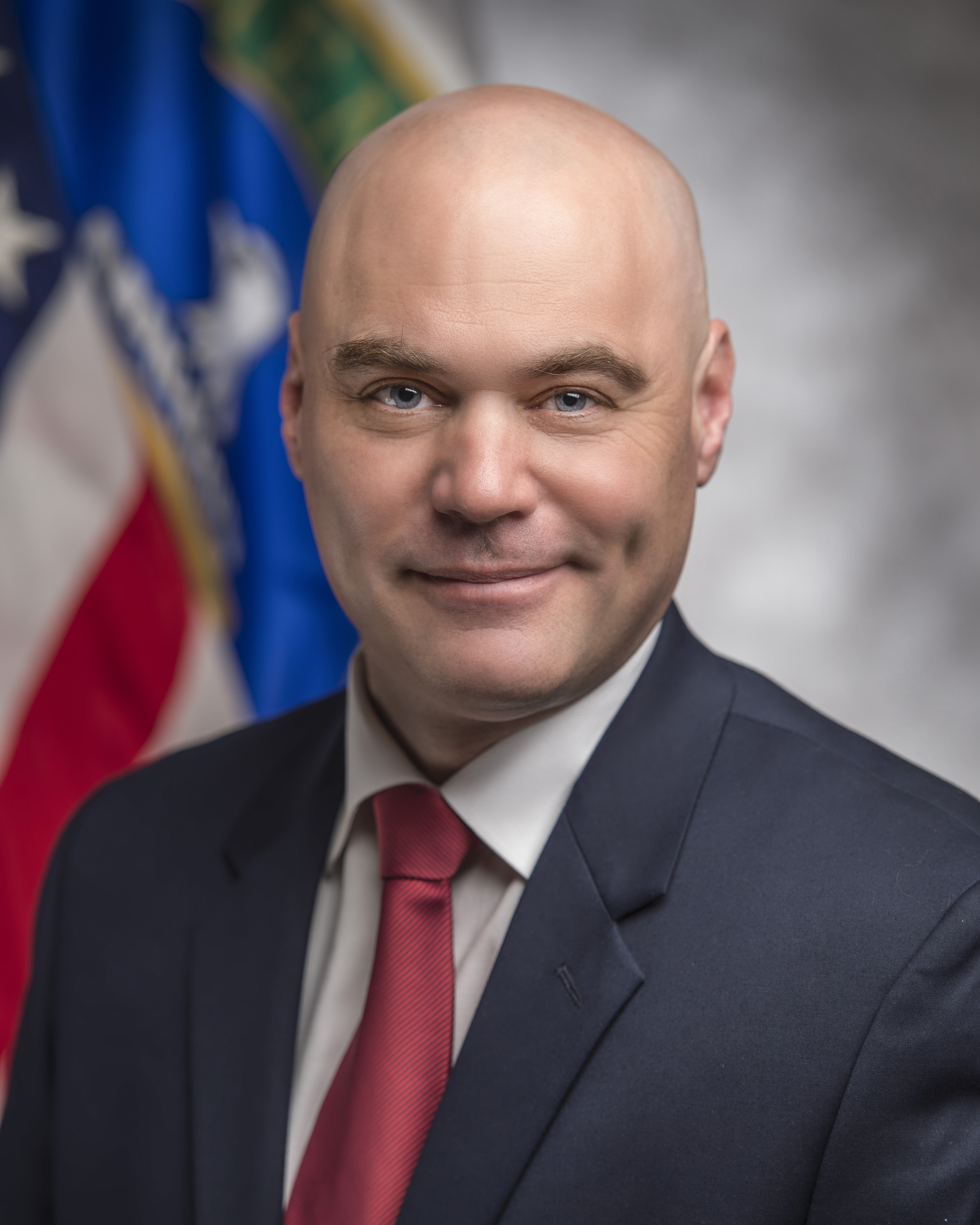

Assistant Secretary of Energy for Electricity Delivery and Energy Reliability
- In office October 16, 2017 – October 2020
- President: Donald Trump
- Preceded by: Patricia A. Hoffman
- Succeeded by: Gene Rodrigues

Personal details
- Education: Manhattan College; Pace University School of Law

Bruce John Walker is an American engineer, lawyer, and government official who serves as the Assistant Secretary of Energy (Electricity Delivery and Energy Reliability). Prior to assuming his current role, he founded Modern Energy Insights, Inc., which specializes in evaluating risk for utilities' electric infrastructure. Walker previously worked at National Grid as the vice president of asset strategy and policy and at Consolidated Edison, where he last held the position of director of corporate emergency management and served on the biological chemical weapons response team. He has served as a member of the United States Department of Energy's Electricity Advisory Committee. Walker co-founded the Global Smart Grid Federation. He has also served as the deputy county executive for Putnam County, New York, and as the acting energy sector chief for the Hudson Valley Infragard.
