= Political appointments in the United States =

United States government offices

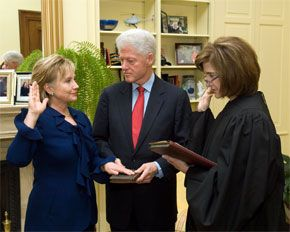
Hillary Clinton takes oath-of-office as United States Secretary of State. Former U.S. President Bill Clinton also pictured. Administering the oath is Judge Kathryn A. Oberly.

According to the United States Office of Government Ethics, a political appointee is "every full-time, non-career Presidential or Vice-Presidential appointee, non-career appointee in the Senior Executive Service (or other SES-type system), and appointee to a position that has been excepted from the competitive service by reason of being of a confidential or policymaking character (Schedule C and other positions excepted under comparable criteria) in an executive agency." However, “[i]t does not include any person appointed as a member of the Senior Foreign Service or solely as a uniformed service commissioned officer.". As of 2016, there were around 4,000 political appointment positions which an incoming administration needs to review, and fill or confirm, of which about 1,200 require Senate confirmation. The White House Presidential Personnel Office (PPO) is one of the offices most responsible for political appointees and for assessing candidates to work at or for the White House.

These positions are published in the Plum Book (officially, the United States Government Policy and Supporting Positions), a new edition of which is released after each United States presidential election. The list is provided by the U.S. Office of Personnel Management (OPM). The 2020 edition of the Plum Book was published on December 1, 2020.

== Categories ==
According to a 2011 study, the United States has significantly more political appointments than other developed democracies. There are four basic categories of federal political appointments:

- Presidential appointments with Senate confirmation (PAS): These are the highest level officers of the United States. As of 2020, there were 1,118 PAS positions in all. These include:
  - the Cabinet secretaries and their subordinates at the Deputy Secretary, Under Secretary, and Assistant Secretary levels
  - the heads of most independent agencies
  - the 93 United States Attorneys and 93 United States Marshals (one for each federal judicial district)
  - roughly 189 ambassadors and various special envoys for particular regions or issues
  - members of multi-member federal boards, commissions, and councils (such as the National Labor Relations Board, Federal Trade Commission, Securities and Exchange Commission, Consumer Product Safety Commission, Federal Energy Regulatory Commission, and Equal Employment Opportunity Commission), but these positions are for fixed terms and the statutes that create these agencies (their organic statutes) requires some maintenance of a partisan balance
  - Of the 74 federal inspector general positions established by statute, 37 are appointed by the President, 36 of which require Senate confirmation (every IG except for the Special Inspector General for Afghanistan Reconstruction). The remaining 37 IGs are appointed by the head of the federal entity that the IG monitors. Although IGs are intended to have a high degree of political independence, this norm weakened under President Donald Trump, who dismissed a number of inspectors general who had investigated his administration.
- Presidential appointments without Senate confirmation (PA): As at 2016, there were 353 PA positions, most of which were in the Executive Office of the President. As of 2020, there were 354 such positions. The Presidential Appointment Efficiency and Streamlining Act of 2011, which passed with bipartisan support, reclassified about 170 PAS positions to PA.
- Non-career Senior Executive Service (NA): means an individual in a Senior Executive Service position who is not a career appointee, a limited term appointee, or a limited emergency appointee. There were 680 NA positions as of 2016, and 724 as of 2020.
- Schedule C appointments (SC): Schedule C appointees serve in confidential or policy roles immediately subordinate to other appointees. As of 2016, there were 1,403 SC positions, and as of 2020, there were 1,566 SC positions.

Unlike the presidential appointments, the non-career SES and Schedule C appointments tend to be made within each agency and then approved by the White House Presidential Personnel Office (PPO).

== Ethics restrictions ==
Political appointees are subject to stricter ethics restrictions than regular executive-branch employees. There are two categories of appointees, and each category is subject to additional and slightly different ethics restrictions:

- The spoils or patronage system is a practice where government jobs are given, usually after winning an election, to political party supporters, friends and relatives as a reward for working toward victory, and as an incentive to keep working for the party.
- The merit system is the process of promoting and hiring government employees based on their ability to perform a job. A common conception of the federal government's merit system principles is that they are designed to ensure fair and open recruitment and competition and employment practices free of political influence or other non-merit factors. Although that is certainly true, a closer reading of those principles suggests a much broader policy objective that relates directly to managing the ongoing performance of the federal workforce.

Political appointees are required to take an ethics pledge not to accept gifts from lobbyists. This is because of Executive Order 13490. Under Section 102 of Executive Order 12674, political appointees who are appointed by the president are not allowed to receive any income from outside employment or activities. Exceptions to the gift rule include:

- Title 3 U.S.C. §105 or 3 U.S.C. §107(a) positions whose basic pay is below GS-9 on the U.S. civil service pay scale.
- Positions within a White House operating unit that is designated as not normally subject to change as a result of a presidential transition.
- Positions within the uniformed services.
- U.S. Foreign Service positions that do not require Senate confirmation

Political appointees sometimes attempt to transfer to a career position in the competitive service, excepted service, or Senior Executive Service. This practice, known as "burrowing in", is desired by employees due to increased pay and job security, as career positions do not end when a presidential administration changes. As these appointed positions are selected noncompetitively, while career employees are supposed to be selected on the basis of merit and without political influence, these conversions are subject to extra scrutiny. Since 2010, such conversions require advance approval from OPM, and the Government Accountability Office (GAO) periodically audits the conversions. In 2008, members of Congress criticized the Department of Homeland Security and Department of Justice for improperly allowing political employees to convert to career positions.

== History ==
In United States politics, the system of political appointments comes from a history of the spoils system (also known as a patronage system) which is a practice where a political party, after winning an election, would give government jobs to its supporters, friends and relatives as a reward for working toward victory. The term was derived from the phrase "to the victor belong the spoils" by New York Senator William L. Marcy, referring to the victory of the Jackson Democrats in the election of 1828, with the term "spoils" meaning goods or benefits taken from the loser in a competition, election or military victory. Though it is commonly assumed that the patronage system in the United States first came into general use during Andrew Jackson's presidency, it actually has an older history. President Thomas Jefferson, a Democratic-Republican, favored a policy of keeping rival Federalists out of government.

The patronage system thrived in the U.S. federal government until 1883. In 1820 Congress limited federal administrators to four-year terms, which led to constant turnover; by the 1860s and the Civil War, patronage had led to widespread inefficiency and political corruption. Although it used to be confined to cabinet positions, department heads, and foreign ambassadorships, by the 1860s patronage had spread to low-level government positions. This meant that when the incumbent political party lost a presidential election, the federal government underwent wholesale turnover.

On July 2, 1881, Charles J. Guiteau, a disaffected and mentally unstable political office seeker, assassinated President James Garfield. This highlighted how much the patronage problem had gotten out of control, and shifted public opinion against the patronage system. Congress was eventually spurred to pass the Pendleton Civil Service Reform Act of 1883, which created a Civil Service Commission and advocated a merit system for selecting government employees.

In addition, passage of the Hatch Act of 1939 forbade the intimidation or bribery of voters and restricted political campaign activities by federal employees. It prohibited using any public funds designated for relief or public works for electoral purposes. It forbade officials paid with federal funds from using promises of jobs, promotion, financial assistance, contracts, or any other benefit to coerce campaign contributions or political support, which restricted most partisan political activities of federal employees. By 1980, 90% of federal positions had become part of the civil service system, which led state and local governments to employ large patronage systems. Big-city political machines in places such as New York City, Boston, and Chicago thrived in the late nineteenth century. Being as a patronage system not only rewarded political supporters for past support, it also encouraged future support, because persons who have a patronage job would try to retain it by campaigning for the party at the next election. Large-scale patronage systems declined steadily during the twentieth century. During the Progressive Era (1900–1920), "good government" reformers overthrew political machines and installed civil service systems. Chicago, under Mayor Richard J. Daley, remained the last bastion of patronage, existing in its purest form until the late 1970s.

In October 2020, in the final months of his administration, President Donald Trump issued an executive order creating a new Schedule F category within the excepted service for employees "in confidential, policy-determining, policy-making and policy-advocating positions" and instructed agencies to identify and transfer competitive service employees that meet that description into the new job classification. The initiative would strip hundreds of thousands of federal workers of civil service protections, effectively making them at-will employees, and would have politicized a major portion of the civil service. Trump's successor, President Joe Biden, rescinded this executive order in January 2021, shortly after taking office, repealing the "Schedule F" plan.

== Executive vacancies ==
A high rate of executive branch vacancies has long been a problem. In his first term, President Donald Trump, did not fill many vacancies and relied, to a far greater extent than previous presidents, on "acting" officials. For example, under Trump, as of mid-2020, 65% of Senate-confirmed positions at the Homeland Security Department, 55% of Senate-confirmed positions at the Justice Department, and 45% of Senate-confirmed positions of the Transportation Department were vacant; in those departments, 12%, 31%, and 14% of those positions, respectively, had been continuously vacant under Trump. This practice diminished the Senate's advice and consent power, a check on the president's power to make appointments. In some cases, Trump appointed an individual to a high-level "acting" post after the individual's nomination had been withdrawn due to lack of support from the Senate; this was the case in Trump's naming of Anthony Tata to a high-level Defense Department post ("official performing the duties of Deputy Undersecretary of Defense for Policy") and Ken Cuccinelli to a high-level Homeland Security post ("acting Deputy Secretary of Homeland Security").

== Efficacy ==
A 2011 study published in the Journal of Public Administration Research and Theory by Nick Gallo and David Lewis evaluated more than 350 managers of federal agencies during the George W. Bush administration with a program assessment rating tool ("PART") to determine efficacy and found that programs run by political appointees from the campaign or party who won the most recent presidential election tended to be less effective than programs run by other political appointees or by career employees. The study noted that factors other than managerial performance could account for some variances in PART scores, including the nature of the agency (some agencies are regulatory, others extend credit or issue grants, and some provide direct services). The study showed that "programs experiencing more frequent executive turnover" are rated as having worse performance. The study authors concluded that: "Although political skills are undoubtedly important, the evidence here suggests that appointees given jobs partly due to campaign or party work perform worse on average than other appointees and career managers. If persons are given jobs for reasons other than their ability to manage a program or agency well, this decreases the chances they will succeed in that task. The political skills and experience gained from work on the campaign or for the party do not translate into effective governance or management."

A study by Matthew Auer, published in January 2008 in Public Administration Review, found that "Top-tier environmental appointees tend to stay longer in their appointed positions than do presidential appointees generally, and more than 40 percent have prior federal government management experience" but that "White House expectations for appointees' political loyalty" varies depending on the administration, with the Reagan and first-term G. W. Bush administrations having "the highest demands for political loyalty, with consequences for the policy–administration dichotomy in environmental agencies."

== Pay ==
The pay for political appointees varies according to the position, agency, and legal classification. For purposes of pay rates, the Executive Schedule sets the pay rates for the highest-ranking presidential appointees at the Cabinet secretary, deputy secretary, undersecretary, and some assistant secretary levels, with five levels (Levels I through V). (Note: Level I of the Executive Schedule includes 21 positions: the Secretary of State, Secretary of the Treasury, Secretary of Defense, Attorney General, Secretary of the Interior, Secretary of Agriculture, Secretary of Commerce, Secretary of Labor, Secretary of Health and Human Services, Secretary of Housing and Urban Development, Secretary of Transportation, United States Trade Representative, Secretary of Energy, Secretary of Education, Secretary of Veterans Affairs, Secretary of Homeland Security, Director of the Office of Management and Budget, Commissioner of Social Security, Director of National Drug Control Policy, Chairman of the Board of Governors of the Federal Reserve System, and the Director of National Intelligence. Level II includes 38 positions, primarily at the deputy secretary level, and also including other sub-Cabinet officials. Level III includes 107 positions, primarily at the under secretary level, and also including various agency administrators, chairmen of independent agencies, and the Solicitor General of the United States. There are also Level IV and Level V positions.) Pay for other political appointees is set in other ways: non-career SES appointees are paid according to the Pay Plan ES; "administratively determined pay positions" (such as U.S. Attorney posts) have their pay set by their agency, as set forth by Pay Plan AD; and most Schedule C appointees are paid according to the same General Schedule (or equivalent) as used for career employees in their agency. Executive Schedule and non-career SES employees do not receive locality pay, but Schedule C appointees do receive locality pay. For some roles, salary is negotiable depending upon qualifications and salary history; for other positions, salary is fixed.

Pay for political appointees is generally lower than pay for positions of equivalent responsibility in the private sector; Jeffrey Neal, the former chief human capital officer for the U.S. Department of Homeland Security, noted in an article for the Partnership for Public Service that a U.S. government official "may run a multi-billion-dollar program with thousands of employees and make less (sometimes much less) than $200,000 per year."

== See also ==
- List of positions filled by presidential appointment with Senate confirmation
- List of United States political appointments across party lines
- Number of United States political appointments by agency
- Merit system
- Spoils system
- Meritocracy
- Bureaucracy
- Public Administration
- Federal Vacancies Reform Act of 1998
