= List of positions filled by presidential appointment with Senate confirmation =

This is a list of positions filled by presidential appointment with Senate confirmation. Under the Appointments Clause of the United States Constitution and law of the United States, certain federal positions appointed by the president of the United States require confirmation (advice and consent) of the United States Senate.

These "PAS" (Presidential Appointment needing Senate confirmation) positions, as well as other types of federal government positions, are published in the United States Government Policy and Supporting Positions (Plum Book), which is released after each United States presidential election. A 2012 Congressional Research Service study estimated that approximately 1200–1400 positions require Senate confirmation.

== Committee on Agriculture, Nutrition and Forestry ==
=== Department of Agriculture ===
- Secretary of Agriculture
- Deputy Secretary of Agriculture
- Under Secretary of Agriculture for Food, Nutrition, and Consumer Services
- Under Secretary of Agriculture for Food Safety
- Under Secretary of Agriculture for Marketing and Regulatory Programs
- Under Secretary of Agriculture for Natural Resources and Environment
- Under Secretary of Agriculture for Research, Education, and Economics
- Under Secretary of Agriculture for Rural Development
- Under Secretary of Agriculture for Farm and Foreign Agricultural Services
- Under Secretary of Agriculture for Trade and Foreign Agricultural Affairs
- Assistant Secretary of Agriculture for Congressional Relations
- Assistant Secretary of Agriculture for Civil Rights
- General Counsel
- Chief Financial Officer
- Inspector General

=== Independent agencies ===
- 5 Commissioners of the Commodity Futures Trading Commission (political balance required; five-year term of office; chair, who must first be confirmed as a commissioner, also needs to be confirmed)
- 3 Members of the Farm Credit Administration (political balance required; six-year term of office)

== Committee on Armed Services ==
=== Department of Defense ===
- Military Officers (commissions and promotions) – Officers receive a commission assigning them to the officer corps from the President (with the consent of the Senate). Promotions of all commissioned military officers are also commissioned by the President (with the consent of the Senate).

==== Office of the Secretary of Defense ====
- Secretary of Defense
  - Deputy Secretary of Defense
  - General Counsel of the Department of Defense
  - Inspector General of the Department of Defense
  - Assistant Secretary of Defense for Legislative Affairs
  - Chief Information Officer (New Position as of the 116th Congress)
  - Under Secretary of Defense for Acquisition and Sustainment
    - Deputy Under Secretary of Defense for Acquisition and Sustainment
    - Assistant Secretary of Defense for Acquisition
    - Assistant Secretary of Defense for Sustainment
    - Assistant Secretary of Defense for Energy, Installations, and Environment
    - Assistant Secretary of Defense for Nuclear Deterrence, Chemical and Biological Defense Policy and Programs
    - Assistant Secretary of Defense for Industrial Base Policy
  - Under Secretary of Defense (Comptroller) / Chief Financial Officer of the Department of Defense
    - Deputy Under Secretary of Defense (Comptroller)
  - Under Secretary of Defense for Intelligence and Security
    - Deputy Under Secretary of Defense for Intelligence and Security
  - Under Secretary of Defense for Personnel and Readiness
    - Deputy Under Secretary of Defense for Personnel and Readiness
    - Assistant Secretary of Defense for Health Affairs
      - 9 Members of the Uniformed Services University of the Health Sciences Board of Regents (six-year terms of office)
    - Assistant Secretary of Defense for Manpower and Reserve Affairs
    - Assistant Secretary of Defense for Readiness
  - Under Secretary of Defense for Policy
    - Deputy Under Secretary of Defense for Policy
    - Assistant Secretary of Defense for Cyber Policy
    - Assistant Secretary of Defense for Homeland Defense and Hemispheric Affairs
    - Assistant Secretary of Defense for Indo-Pacific Security Affairs
    - Assistant Secretary of Defense for International Security Affairs
    - Assistant Secretary of Defense for Nuclear Deterrence, Chemical and Biological Defense Policy and Programs
    - Assistant Secretary of Defense for Space Policy
    - Assistant Secretary of Defense for Special Operations and Low-Intensity Conflict
    - Assistant Secretary of Defense for Strategy, Plans, and Capabilities
  - Under Secretary of Defense for Research and Engineering
    - Deputy Under Secretary of Defense for Research and Engineering

==== Department of the Air Force ====
- Secretary
- Under Secretary
- Assistant Secretary for Acquisition, Technology and Logistics
- Assistant Secretary for Energy, Installations and Environment
- Assistant Secretary for Financial Management and Comptroller
- Assistant Secretary for Manpower and Reserve Affairs
- Assistant Secretary for Space Acquisition and Integration
- General Counsel
- Chief of Staff (four-year term of office)
- Vice Chief of Staff (four-year term of office)

==== Department of the Army ====
- Secretary
- Under Secretary
- Assistant Secretary for Acquisition, Logistics and Technology
- Assistant Secretary for Civil Works
- Assistant Secretary for Financial Management and Comptroller
- Assistant Secretary for Installations, Energy and Environment
- Assistant Secretary for Manpower and Reserve Affairs
- General Counsel
- Chief of Staff (four-year term of office)
- Vice Chief of Staff (four-year term of office)

==== Department of the Navy ====
- Secretary
- Under Secretary
- Assistant Secretary for Financial Management and Comptroller
- Assistant Secretary of the Navy (Energy, Installations and Environment)
- Assistant Secretary for Manpower and Reserve Affairs
- Assistant Secretary for Research, Development and Acquisition
- General Counsel
- Chief of Naval Operations (four-year term of office)
- Vice Chief of Naval Operations (four-year term of office)
- Commandant of the Marine Corps (four-year term of office)
- Assistant Commandant of the Marine Corps (four-year term of office)

==== Joint Chiefs of Staff ====
- Chairman of the Joint Chiefs of Staff (four-year term of office)
- Vice Chairman of the Joint Chiefs of Staff (four-year term of office)

=== Department of Energy ===
- Under Secretary of Energy for Nuclear Security/Administrator of the National Nuclear Security Administration
- Principal Deputy Administrator - National Nuclear Security Administration
- Deputy Administrator for Defense Programs - National Nuclear Security Administration
- Deputy Administrator for Defense Nuclear Nonproliferation - National Nuclear Security Administration
- Assistant Secretary for Environmental Management
- Administrator - Energy Information Administration

=== Independent agencies ===
- 5 Members of the Defense Nuclear Facilities Safety Board (political balance required; five-year terms of office)

=== Judicial branch ===
- Five Judges of the United States Court of Appeals for the Armed Forces (political balance required; 15-year terms of office)

== Committee on Banking, Housing, and Urban Affairs ==
=== Department of Commerce ===
- Under Secretary for Export Administration
- Under Secretary for International Trade
- Assistant Secretary for Export Administration
- Assistant Secretary for Export Enforcement
- Assistant Secretary for Trade Promotion/Director General of the U.S. and Foreign Commercial Service
- Under Secretary for Standards and Technology

=== Department of Housing and Urban Development ===
- Secretary
- Deputy Secretary
- Assistant Secretary for Administration
- Assistant Secretary for Community Planning and Development
- Assistant Secretary for Congressional and Intergovernmental Relations
- Assistant Secretary for Fair Housing and Equal Opportunity
- Assistant Secretary for Housing/Federal Housing Commissioner
- Assistant Secretary for Policy Development and Research
- Assistant Secretary for Public and Indian Housing
- Chief Financial Officer
- Director – Office of Federal Housing Enterprise Oversight (five-year term)
- General Counsel
- Inspector General
- President – Government National Mortgage Association (Ginnie Mae)

=== Department of Transportation ===
- Administrator – Federal Transit Administration

=== Department of the Treasury ===
- Under Secretary for Terrorism and Financial Intelligence
- Assistant Secretary for Financial Institutions
- Assistant Secretary for Terrorist Financing
- Comptroller of the Currency (five-year term of office)
- Director of the Mint (five-year term of office)
- Director of the Office of Financial Research (six-year term of office)

=== Executive Office of the President ===
- Chair of the Council of Economic Advisers

=== Independent agencies ===
- Director of the Consumer Financial Protection Bureau (CFPB)
- 5 Members of the Export-Import Bank of the United States (political balance required; four-year terms of office — Chair, who first must be confirmed as a member, also needs to be confirmed.)
- Inspector General of the Export-Import Bank of the United States
- 3 Members of the Federal Deposit Insurance Corporation (political balance required; six-year terms of office — Chair and vice chair, who first must be confirmed as members, also need to be confirmed.)
- Inspector General of the Federal Deposit Insurance Corporation
- Director of the Federal Housing Finance Agency (four-year terms of office)
- 7 Governors of the Federal Reserve System (14-year terms of office — Chair and vice chair, who first must be confirmed as governors, also need to be confirmed for four-year terms in those offices.)
- 3 Members of the National Credit Union Administration (political balance required; six-year terms of office)
- 5 Commissioners of the Securities and Exchange Commission (political balance required; five-year terms of office)
- 3 Directors of the National Cooperative Bank (of 15 total; three-year terms of office)
- 15 to 21 Directors of the National Institute of Building Sciences (three-year terms of office)
- 5 Directors of the Securities Investor Protection Corporation (of 7 total; three-year terms of office)

== Committee on the Budget ==
=== Executive Office of the President ===
Office of Management and Budget

- Director
- Deputy Director

== Committee on Commerce, Science, and Transportation ==
=== Department of Commerce ===
- Secretary of Commerce
- Deputy Secretary of Commerce
- Assistant Secretary of Commerce for Legislative and Intergovernmental Affairs
- Chief Financial Officer and Assistant Secretary of Commerce for Administration
- General Counsel of the Department of Commerce
- Under Secretary of Commerce for Industry and Security
- Under Secretary of Commerce for Economic Affairs
- Director of the Census
- Under Secretary of Commerce for International Trade
- Assistant Secretary for Import Administration
- Assistant Secretary for Market Access and Compliance
- Assistant Secretary for Manufacturing and Services
- Assistant Secretary of Commerce and Director General of the United States Foreign Commercial Service
- Under Secretary for Oceans and Atmosphere/Administrator of the National Oceanic and Atmospheric Administration
- Assistant Secretary for Environmental Observation and Prediction
- Assistant Secretary for Conservation and Management
- Chief Scientist
- Assistant Secretary for Communications and Information
- Under Secretary for Standards and Technology/Director of the National Institute of Standards and Technology
- Under Secretary for Intellectual Property/Director, U.S. Patent and Trademark Office
- Inspector General

=== Department of Homeland Security ===
- Secretary
- Under Secretary for Science and Technology
- Administrator of the Transportation Security Administration
- Commandant of the United States Coast Guard
- United States Coast Guard officers (commissions and promotions)

=== Department of Transportation ===
- Secretary
- Deputy Secretary
- Under Secretary for Policy
- Assistant Secretary for Aviation and International Affairs
- Assistant Secretary for Budget and Programs and Chief Financial Officer
- Assistant Secretary for Governmental Affairs
- Assistant Secretary for Transportation Policy
- Administrator – Federal Aviation Administration (five-year term of office)
- Administrator – Federal Motor Carrier Safety Administration
- Administrator – Federal Railroad Administration
- Administrator – Maritime Administration
- Administrator – National Highway Traffic Safety Administration
- Administrator – Pipeline and Hazardous Materials Safety Administration
- Administrator – Research and Innovative Technology Administration
- General Counsel
- Inspector General
- 5 Members of the Surface Transportation Board (political balance required; five-year terms of office)
- 8 Members of the Amtrak Board of Directors (five-year term of office)

=== National Aeronautics and Space Administration ===
- Administrator of the National Aeronautics and Space Administration
- Deputy Administrator of the National Aeronautics and Space Administration
- Chief Financial Officer of the National Aeronautics and Space Administration
- Inspector General of the National Aeronautics and Space Administration

=== Executive Office of the President ===
Office of Science and Technology Policy

- Director
- Associate Director for Science
- Associate Director for Technology
- Associate Director for National Security & International Affairs
- Associate Director for Energy & Environment

=== Independent agencies ===
- 5 Commissioners of the Consumer Product Safety Commission (political balance required; seven-year terms of office; chair, who first must be confirmed as a member, also needs to be confirmed.)
- 5 Commissioners of the Federal Communications Commission (political balance required; five-year terms of office)
- 5 Commissioners of the Federal Maritime Commission (political balance required; five-year terms of office)
- 5 Commissioners of the Federal Trade Commission (political balance required; seven-year terms of office)
- 5 Members of the National Transportation Safety Board (political balance required; five-year terms of office - Chair, who first must be confirmed as a member, also needs to be confirmed.)
- Federal Coordinator for Alaska Natural Gas Transportation Projects
- 9 Directors of the Corporation for Public Broadcasting (political balance required; six-year terms of office)
- 3 Directors of the Metropolitan Washington Airports Authority (six-year terms of office; political balance required)
- 5 Members of the Great Lakes St. Lawrence Seaway Development Corporation Advisory Board (political balance required; indefinite terms of office)

== Committee on Energy and Natural Resources ==
=== Department of Energy ===
- Secretary
- Deputy Secretary
- Under Secretary for Energy and Environment
- Under Secretary for Science
- Under Secretary for Infrastructure
- Administrator – Energy Information Administration
- Assistant Secretary for Congressional and Intergovernmental Affairs
- Assistant Secretary for Electricity Delivery and Energy Reliability – runs the Office of Electricity Delivery and Energy Reliability
- Assistant Secretary for Energy Efficiency and Renewable Energy – runs the Office of Energy Efficiency and Renewable Energy
- Assistant Secretary for Environmental Management – runs the Office of Environmental Management
- Assistant Secretary for Fossil Energy – runs the Office of Fossil Energy
- Assistant Secretary for International Affairs and Domestic Policy
- Assistant Secretary for Nuclear Energy – runs the Office of Nuclear Energy
- Chief Financial Officer
- Director – Advanced Research Projects Agency - Energy
- Director – Office of Civilian Radioactive Waste Management
- Director – Office of Economic Impact and Diversity
- Director – Office of Science
- General Counsel
- Inspector General
- 5 Commissioners of the Federal Energy Regulatory Commission (political balance required; five-year terms of office)

=== Department of the Interior ===
- Secretary
- Deputy Secretary
- Assistant Secretary for Fish, Wildlife and Parks
- Assistant Secretary for Land and Minerals Management
- Assistant Secretary for Policy, Management, and Budget and Chief Financial Officer
- Assistant Secretary for Water and Science
- Commissioner – Bureau of Reclamation
- Director – Bureau of Land Management
- Director – National Park Service
- Director – Office of Surface Mining Reclamation and Enforcement
- Director – United States Geological Survey
- Inspector General
- Solicitor
- Federal Coordinator for Alaska Natural Gas Transportation Projects

== Committee on Environment and Public Works ==
=== Department of Commerce ===
- Assistant Secretary for Economic Development

=== Department of Defense ===
- Assistant Secretary of the Army (Civil Works)

=== Department of the Interior ===
- Assistant Secretary for Fish, Wildlife and Parks
- Director – United States Fish and Wildlife Service

=== Department of Transportation ===
- Administrator – Federal Highway Administration

=== Executive Office of the President ===
- Chair of the Council on Environmental Quality

=== Environmental Protection Agency ===
- Administrator
- Deputy Administrator
- Assistant Administrator
- Assistant Administrator for Administration and Resources Management
- Assistant Administrator for Air and Radiation
- Assistant Administrator for Enforcement and Compliance Assurance
- Assistant Administrator for Environmental Information
- Assistant Administrator for International and Tribal Affairs
- Assistant Administrator for Prevention, Pesticides, and Toxic Substances
- Assistant Administrator for Research and Development
- Assistant Administrator for Solid Waste and Emergency Response
- Assistant Administrator for Water
- Chief Financial Officer
- General Counsel
- Inspector General

=== Other independent agencies ===
- Federal Cochair of the Appalachian Regional Commission
- 5 Members of the Chemical Safety and Hazard Investigation Board (five-year terms of office – Chair, who first must be confirmed as a member, also needs to be confirmed.)
- Federal Cochair of the Delta Regional Authority
- 5 Commissioners of the Nuclear Regulatory Commission (political balance required; five-year terms of office)
- Inspector General of the Nuclear Regulatory Commission
- 9 Directors of the Tennessee Valley Authority (five-year terms of office)
- Inspector General of the Tennessee Valley Authority
- 9 Trustees of the Morris K. Udall Scholarship and Excellence in National Environmental Policy Foundation (political balance required; six-year terms of office)

== Committee on Finance ==
=== Department of Commerce ===
- Under Secretary for International Trade
- Assistant Secretary for Import Administration
- Assistant Secretary for Market Access and Compliance

=== Department of Health and Human Services ===
- Secretary
- Deputy Secretary
- Administrator – Centers for Medicare and Medicaid Services
- Assistant Secretary for Resources and Technology
- Chief financial officer
- Assistant Secretary of the Administration for Children and Families
- Assistant Secretary for Health
- Assistant Secretary for Legislation
- Assistant Secretary for Planning and Evaluation
- Commissioner – Administration of Children, Youth, and Families
- General Counsel
- Inspector General
- Director of the Centers for Disease Control and Prevention

=== Department of Homeland Security ===
- Secretary
- Commissioner of United States Customs and Border Protection

=== Department of the Treasury ===
- Secretary
- Deputy Secretary
- Under Secretary for Domestic Finance
- Under Secretary for International Affairs
- Assistant Secretary for Economic Policy
- Assistant Secretary for Financial Markets
- Assistant Secretary (Deputy Under Secretary) for International Affairs
- Assistant Secretary (Deputy Under Secretary) for Legislative Affairs
- Assistant Secretary for Tax Policy
- Chief Financial Officer
- Director — Policy Planning
- Chief Counsel — Internal Revenue Service/Assistant General Counsel for Tax
- Commissioner — Internal Revenue Service (five-year terms of office)
- General Counsel
- Inspector General
- Inspector General — Tax Administration

=== Executive Office of the President ===
Office of the United States Trade Representative

- U.S. Trade Representative
- 3 Deputy U.S. Trade Representatives
- Chief Agricultural Negotiator
- Chief Intellectual Property Negotiator

=== Other independent agencies ===
- Director of the Pension Benefit Guaranty Corporation
- Commissioner of the Social Security Administration (six-year term of office)
- Deputy Commissioner of the Social Security Administration (six-year term of office)
- Inspector General of the Social Security Administration
- 6 Commissioners of the United States International Trade Commission (political balance required; nine-year terms of office)
- 2 Trustees of the Federal Hospital Insurance Trust Fund (of 6 total; political balance required; four-year terms of office)
- 2 Trustees of the Federal Old-Age and Survivors Trust Fund and the Disability Insurance Trust Fund (of 6 total; political balance required; four-year terms of office)
- 2 Trustees of the Federal Supplementary Medical Insurance Trust Fund, Board of Trustees (of 6 total; political balance required; four-year terms of office)
- 6 Members of the Internal Revenue Service Oversight Board (five-year terms of office)
- 3 Members of the Social Security Advisory Board (of 7 total; political balance required; six-year terms of office)

=== Judicial branch ===
- 19 Judges of the United States Tax Court (15-year terms of office)

== Committee on Foreign Relations ==
=== Department of State ===
- Secretary of State
- Deputy Secretary of State
- Deputy Secretary of State for Management and Resources
- Under Secretary of State for Arms Control and International Security
  - Assistant Secretary of State for Arms Control, Verification and Compliance
  - Assistant Secretary of State for International Security and Nonproliferation
  - Assistant Secretary of State for Political-Military Affairs
- Under Secretary of State for Foreign Assistance, Humanitarian Affairs, and Religious Freedom
  - Assistant Secretary of State for Conflict and Stabilization Operations
  - Assistant Secretary of State for Democracy, Human Rights, and Labor
  - Assistant Secretary of State for International Narcotics and Law Enforcement Affairs
  - Assistant Secretary of State for Population, Refugees, and Migration
  - Coordinator for Counterterrorism, with the rank and status of Ambassador-at-Large
  - Ambassador-at-Large for Global Criminal Justice
  - Director of the Office to Monitor and Combat Trafficking, with rank of Ambassador-at-Large
  - Ambassador-at-Large for International Religious Freedom
- Under Secretary of State for Economic Growth, Energy, and the Environment
  - Assistant Secretary of State for Economic and Business Affairs
  - Coordinator for Sanctions (new position as of the 117th United States Congress)
  - Assistant Secretary for Oceans and International Environmental and Scientific Affairs
- Under Secretary for Management and Chief Financial Officer of the Department of State
  - Assistant Secretary for Consular Affairs
  - Assistant Secretary for Diplomatic Security
  - Director of the Office of Foreign Missions, with rank of Ambassador
  - Director General of the Foreign Service and Director of Human Resources
- Under Secretary for Political Affairs
  - Assistant Secretary for African Affairs
  - Assistant Secretary for East Asian and Pacific Affairs
  - Assistant Secretary for European and Eurasian Affairs
  - Assistant Secretary for International Organization Affairs
  - Assistant Secretary for Near Eastern Affairs
  - Assistant Secretary for South and Central Asian Affairs
  - Assistant Secretary for Western Hemisphere Affairs
- Under Secretary for Public Diplomacy and Public Affairs
  - Assistant Secretary for Educational and Cultural Affairs
- Reports directly to the Secretary & Deputy Secretary:
  - Assistant Secretary for Intelligence and Research
  - Assistant Secretary for Legislative Affairs
  - Coordinator of United States Government Activities to Combat HIV/AIDS Globally, with the rank of Ambassador-at-Large
  - U.S. Permanent Representative to the Organization of American States
  - U.S. Permanent Representative to the North Atlantic Treaty Organization
  - Ambassador-at-Large for Global Women's Issues
  - Inspector General of the Department of State
  - Legal Adviser of the Department of State
  - Chief of Protocol of the United States, with rank of Ambassador
  - 188 Ambassadors
  - Foreign Service Officers (commissions and promotions)

==== United States Mission to the United Nations ====
- U.S. Permanent Representative and Chief of Mission to the United Nations
- U.S. Deputy Permanent Representative – United Nations
- U.S. Representative – United Nations Agencies for Food and Agriculture
- U.S. Representative – United Nations Economic and Social Council
- U.S. Alternate Representative – Special Political Affairs in the United Nations
- U.S. Representative – United Nations Management and Reform
- U.S. Representative – European Office of the United Nations (Geneva)
- U.S. Representative – United Nations Office at Vienna (also serves as a representative to the International Atomic Energy Agency)
- U.S. Representative – International Atomic Energy Agency
- U.S. Deputy Representative – International Atomic Energy Agency
- U.S. Representative to sessions of the General Assembly and other United Nations Bodies — numerous positions (terms of office depends on length of session)

=== United States Agency for International Development ===
- Administrator
- Assistant Administrator — Asia and Near East
- Assistant Administrator — Democracy, Conflict, and Humanitarian Assistance
- Assistant Administrator — Economic Growth, Agriculture, and Trade
- Assistant Administrator — Europe and Eurasia
- Assistant Administrator — Global Health
- Assistant Administrator — Latin America and Caribbean
- Assistant Administrator — Legislative and Public Affairs
- Assistant Administrator — Policy and Program Coordination
- Assistant Administrator — Sub-Saharan Africa
- Deputy Administrator
- Inspector General

=== International Bank for Reconstruction and Development ===
- U.S. Executive Director two-year term of office; full-time
- U.S. Alternate Executive Director
- Governor
- Alternate Governor

=== International Development Association ===
- U.S. Executive director for the international Development Association
- U.S. Alternate director for the international Development Association
- Governor for the international Development Association
- Alternate Governor for the international Development Association

=== International Finance Corporation ===
- U.S. Executive director for the International Finance Corporation
- U.S. Alternate Director for the International finance Corporation
- Governor for the International Finance corporation
- Alternate Governor for the International Finance Corporation

=== Other independent agencies ===
- U.S. Executive Director of the European Bank for Reconstruction and Development
- Director of the International Broadcasting Bureau, Broadcasting Board of Governors
- 3 Commissioners of the International Joint Commission, United States and Canada
- U.S. Executive Director of the International Monetary Fund (two-year term of office)
- U.S. Alternate Executive Director of the International Monetary Fund (two-year term of office)
- U.S. Executive Director of the Inter-American Development Bank (three-year term of office)
- U.S. Alternate Executive Director of the Inter-American Development Bank (three-year term of office)
- U.S. Alternate Executive Director for the Inter-American Investment Corporation
- Director of the United States Trade and Development Agency
- U.S. Executive Director of the African Development Bank (five-year term of office; full-time)
- Governor and Alternate Governor of the African Development Bank (five-year terms of office; part-time)
- U.S. Executive Director of the Asian Development Bank (full-time)
- Governor and Alternate Governor of the Asian Development Bank (part-time)
- Chief Executive Officer of the Millennium Challenge Corporation (full-time)
- 4 Directors of the Millennium Challenge Corporation (of 9 total; part-time; three-year terms of office)
- President/Chief Executive Officer of the Overseas Private Investment Corporation (full-time)
- Executive Vice President of the Overseas Private Investment Corporation (full-time)
- 8 Directors of the Overseas Private Investment Corporation (of 15 total; part-time; three-year terms of office)
- Director of the Peace Corps (full-time)
- Deputy Director of the Peace Corps (full-time)
- 15 Members of the Peace Corps National Advisory Council (part-time; political balance required; two-year terms of office)
- 9 Members of the Advisory Board for Cuba Broadcasting (political balance required; three-year terms of office)
- 7 Directors of the African Development Foundation (political balance required; six-year terms of office)
- Governor of the African Development Fund
- Alternate Governor of the African Development Fund
- 8 Members of the Broadcasting Board of Governors (of 9 total; political balance required; three-year terms of office)
- 9 Directors of the Inter-American Foundation (political balance required; six-year terms of office)
- 7 Commissioners of the U.S. Advisory Commission on Public Diplomacy (political balance required; three-year terms of office)

== Committee on Health, Education, Labor, and Pensions ==
=== Department of Education ===
- Secretary
- Deputy Secretary
- Director, Institute of Education Sciences (six-year term of office)
- Under Secretary
- Assistant Secretary for Civil Rights – runs the Office for Civil Rights
- Assistant Secretary for Communications and Outreach – runs the Office of Communications and Outreach
- Assistant Secretary for Elementary and Secondary Education – runs the Office of Elementary and Secondary Education
- Assistant Secretary for Legislation and Congressional Affairs
- Assistant Secretary for Planning, Evaluation and Policy Development – runs the Office of Planning, Evaluation, and Policy Development
- Assistant Secretary for Postsecondary Education – runs the Office of Postsecondary Education
- Assistant Secretary for Special Education and Rehabilitative Services – runs the Office of Special Education and Rehabilitative Services
- Assistant Secretary for Career, Technical and Adult Education – runs the Office of Career, Technical, and Adult Education
- Chief Financial Officer
- Commissioner – Rehabilitation Services Administration
- General Counsel
- Inspector General

=== Department of Health and Human Services ===
- Secretary
- Administrator — Substance Abuse and Mental Health Services Administration
- Assistant Secretary for Aging
- Assistant Secretary for Health
- Assistant Secretary for the Administration of Children and Families
- Commissioner for the Administration of Children, Youth, and Families
- Assistant Secretary for Preparedness and Response
- Commissioner of Food and Drugs
- Director – National Institutes of Health
- Surgeon General (four-year term of office)

=== Department of Labor ===
- Secretary of Labor
- Deputy Secretary of Labor
- Assistant Secretary for Congressional and Intergovernmental Affairs
- Assistant Secretary for Disability Employment Policy
- Assistant Secretary for Employee Benefits Security Administration
- Assistant Secretary for Employment and Training Administration
- Assistant Secretary for Mine Safety and Health Administration
- Assistant Secretary for Occupational Safety and Health Administration
- Assistant Secretary for Policy
- Assistant Secretary for Veterans' Employment and Training Service
- Administrator – Wage and Hour Division
- Chief Financial Officer
- Commissioner – Bureau of Labor Statistics
- Inspector General
- Solicitor

=== Independent agencies ===
- Chief Executive Officer of the Corporation for National and Community Service
- Chief Financial Officer of the Corporation for National and Community Service
- Inspector General of the Corporation for National and Community Service
- 5 Commissioners of the Equal Employment Opportunity Commission (political balance required; five-year terms of office)
- General Counsel of the Equal Employment Opportunity Commission (four-year term of office)
- Director of the Federal Mediation and Conciliation Service
- 5 Commissioners of the Federal Mine Safety and Health Review Commission (six-year terms of office)
- National Endowment for the Arts – Chair (four-year term of office)
- National Endowment for the Humanities – Chair (four-year term of office)
- Institute of Museum and Library Services – Director (four-year term of office)
- 5 Members of the National Labor Relations Board (Political balance is not required, but, by tradition, no more than three members are from the same party; five-year terms of office)
- General Counsel of the National Labor Relations Board (four-year term of office)
- 3 Members of the National Mediation Board (political balance required; three-year terms of office)
- Director of the National Science Foundation (six-year term of office)
- Deputy Director of the National Science Foundation
- 3 Members of the Occupational Safety and Health Review Commission (six-year terms of office)
- Director of the Pension Benefit Guaranty Corporation
- 3 Members of the Railroad Retirement Board (five-year terms of office; chair, who first must be appointed as a member, also needs to be confirmed.)
- Inspector General of the Railroad Retirement Board
- 8 Trustees of the Barry M. Goldwater Scholarship and Excellence in Education Foundation (of 13 total; political balance required; six-year terms of office)
- 15 Directors of the Corporation for National and Community Service (political balance required; five-year terms of office)
- 8 Trustees of the Harry S. Truman Scholarship Foundation (of 13 total; political balance required; six-year terms of office)
- 6 Trustees of the James Madison Memorial Fellowship Foundation (of 13 total; political balance required; six-year terms of office)
- 11 Directors of the Legal Services Corporation (political balance required; three-year terms of office)
- 14 Members of the National Council on the Arts (of 21 total; six-year terms of office)
- 26 Members of the National Council on the Humanities (of 27 total; six-year terms of office)
- 12 Directors of the United States Institute of Peace (of 15 total; political balance required; four-year terms of office)

== Committee on Homeland Security and Governmental Affairs ==
=== Department of Commerce ===
- Director – Bureau of the Census
- Inspector General

=== Department of Homeland Security ===
- Secretary
- Deputy Secretary
- Under Secretary for Management
- Under Secretary for Science and Technology
- Under Secretary of Homeland Security for Intelligence and Analysis
- Under Secretary for Strategy, Policy and Plans
- Director of the Cybersecurity and Infrastructure Security Agency
- Director of the U.S. Immigration and Customs Enforcement
- Administrator of the Federal Emergency Management Agency
  - Deputy Administrator of the Federal Emergency Management Agency
  - Deputy Administrator of the Federal Emergency Management Agency (Resilience)
- General Counsel
- Chief Financial Officer

=== Department Inspectors General ===
- Inspector General - Department of Defense
- Inspector General - Department of Education
- Inspector General - Department of Energy
- Inspector General - Department of Health and Human Services
- Inspector General - Department of Housing and Urban Development
- Inspector General - Department of the Interior
- Inspector General - Department of Labor
- Inspector General - Department of Transportation
- Inspector General - Department of the Treasury
- Inspector General - Environmental Protection Agency

=== Executive Office of the President ===
- National Cyber Director (position established April 12, 2021)

Office of Management and Budget

- Director
- Deputy Director
- Deputy Director for Management
- Administrator of the Office of Federal Procurement Policy
- Administrator of the Office of Information and Regulatory Affairs
- Controller of the Office of Federal Financial Management

=== Office of Personnel Management ===
- Director of the Office of Personnel Management (four-year term of office)
- Deputy Director of the Office of Personnel Management
- Inspector General of the Office of Personnel Management

=== Independent agencies ===
- Director of the Court Services and Offender Supervision Agency to the District of Columbia (six-year term of office)
- 3 Members of the Federal Labor Relations Authority (political balance required; five-year terms of office)
- General Counsel of the Federal Labor Relations Authority (five-year term of office)
- Administrator of the General Services Administration
- Inspector General of the General Services Administration
- 3 Members of the Merit Systems Protection Board (political balance required; seven-year terms of office). The Chair, who first must be confirmed as a member, also needs to be confirmed.
- Archivist of the United States, National Archives and Records Administration
- Director of the Office of Government Ethics (five-year term of office)
- Special Counsel of the Office of Special Counsel (five-year term of office)
- 5 Commissioners of the Postal Regulatory Commission (political balance required; six-year terms of office)
- 5 Members of Federal Retirement Thrift Investment Board (four-year terms of office)
- Chair of the Special Panel on Appeals (six-year term of office)
- 9 Governors of the Board of Governors of the United States Postal Service (political balance required; seven-year terms of office)

=== Legislative branch ===
- Comptroller General of the United States, Government Accountability Office (15-year term of office)
- Deputy Comptroller General of the Government Accountability Office

=== Judicial branch ===
- Chief Judge of the District of Columbia Court of Appeals (15-year term of office)
- 9 Judges of the District of Columbia Court of Appeals (15-year terms of office)
- Chief Judge of the Superior Court of the District of Columbia (15-year term of office)
- 61 Judges of the Superior Court of the District of Columbia (15-year terms of office)

== Committee on Indian Affairs ==
=== Department of Health and Human Services ===
- Director – Indian Health Service (four-year term of office)
- Commissioner – Administration for Native Americans

=== Department of the Interior ===
- Assistant Secretary – Indian Affairs
- Chair – National Indian Gaming Commission (three-year term of office)
- Special Trustee – American Indians

== Select Committee on Intelligence ==
=== Department of Justice ===
- Assistant Attorney General – National Security Division

=== Department of State ===
- Assistant Secretary of State for Intelligence and Research

=== Department of the Treasury ===
- Assistant Secretary for Intelligence and Analysis

=== Central Intelligence Agency ===
- Director
- General Counsel
- Inspector General

=== Office of the Director of National Intelligence ===
- Director of National Intelligence
- Principal Deputy Director
- Director, National Counterterrorism Center
- Director, National Counterintelligence & Security Center
- General Counsel
- Inspector General of the Intelligence Community

== Committee on the Judiciary ==
=== Department of Commerce ===
- Under Secretary of Commerce for Intellectual Property – United States Patent and Trademark Office

=== Department of Homeland Security ===
- Assistant Secretary – U.S. Immigration and Customs Enforcement
- Director – U.S. Citizenship and Immigration Services

=== Department of Justice ===
- Attorney General
- Solicitor General
- Deputy Attorney General
- Associate Attorney General
- Assistant Attorney General - Antitrust Division
- Assistant Attorney General – Office of Justice Programs
- Assistant Attorney General – Office of Legal Counsel
- Assistant Attorney General – Office of Legal Policy
- Assistant Attorney General – Office of Legislative Affairs
- Assistant Attorney General – Civil Division
- Assistant Attorney General – Civil Rights Division
- Assistant Attorney General – Criminal Division
- Assistant Attorney General – Environment and Natural Resources Division
- Assistant Attorney General – National Security Division
- Assistant Attorney General – Tax Division
- Administrator – Drug Enforcement Administration
- Deputy Administrator – Drug Enforcement Administration
- Director – Bureau of Alcohol, Tobacco, Firearms and Explosives
- Director – Community Relations Service (four-year term of office)
- Director – Federal Bureau of Investigation (10-year term of office)
- Director – Office on Violence Against Women
- Director – United States Marshals Service
- Inspector General
- Special Counsel – Immigration-Related Unfair Employment Practices (four-year term of office)
- 93 United States Attorneys (one in each federal judicial district, except that one U.S. Attorney serves for both the Districts of Guam and the Northern Mariana Islands; four-year terms of office)
- 94 United States Marshals (one in each federal judicial district; four-year terms of office)
- 5 Members of the United States Parole Commission (six-year term of office)
- Chair of the Foreign Claims Settlement Commission (three-year term of office; nominated from among commissioner members)
- 2 other Members of the Foreign Claims Settlement Commission (three-year terms of office)

=== Executive Office of the President ===
Office of National Drug Control Policy

- Director of National Drug Control Policy ("Drug Czar")
- Deputy Director of National Drug Control Policy
- Deputy Director for Demand Reduction
- Deputy Director for Supply Reduction
- Deputy Director for State and Local Affairs

=== Independent agencies ===
- 11 Directors of the State Justice Institute (three-year terms of office)
- Chair of the Administrative Conference of the United States (five-year term of office)

=== Judicial branch ===
- Chief Justice of the United States (life tenure)
- 8 Associate Justices of the Supreme Court of the United States (life tenure)
- 179 Judges of the United States courts of appeals (life tenure)
- 16 Judges of the United States Court of Federal Claims (15-year terms of office)
- 9 Judges of the United States Court of International Trade (political balance required; life tenure)
- 678 Judges of the United States district courts (Most are life tenure; in total there are 674 permanent judgeships and four territorial court judgeships.)
- Chair of the United States Sentencing Commission (six-year term of office; nominated from among commission members)
- 3 Vice Chairs of the United States Sentencing Commission (six-year terms of office; designated from among commission members)
- 3 other Commissioners of the United States Sentencing Commission (political balance required; six-year terms of office; one of the seven members is also nominated to be the full-time chair of the commission, and two others are designated as full-time vice-chairs)

== Committee on Rules and Administration ==
=== Independent agencies ===
- 4 Commissioners of the Election Assistance Commission (four-year terms of office; political balance required)
- 6 Commissioners of the Federal Election Commission (six-year terms of office; political balance required)

=== Legislative branch ===
- Architect of the Capitol
- Director – United States Government Publishing Office
- Librarian – Library of Congress

== Committee on Small Business and Entrepreneurship ==
=== Small Business Administration ===
- Administrator
- Deputy Administrator
- Chief Counsel for Advocacy
- Inspector General

== Committee on Veterans' Affairs ==
=== Department of Labor ===
- Assistant Secretary of Labor for Veterans' Employment and Training Service

=== Department of Veterans Affairs ===
- Secretary of Veterans Affairs
- Deputy Secretary of Veterans Affairs
- Under Secretary of Veterans Affairs for Benefits (four-year term of office) – heads Veterans Benefits Administration
- Under Secretary of Veterans Affairs for Health (four-year term of office) – heads Veterans Health Administration
- Under Secretary of Veterans Affairs for Memorial Affairs – heads National Cemetery Administration
- Assistant Secretary of Veterans Affairs for Congressional and Legislative Affairs
- Assistant Secretary of Veterans Affairs for Information and Technology
- Assistant Secretary of Veterans Affairs for Policy and Planning
- Chief Financial Officer
- Chairman of the Board of Veterans' Appeals (six-year term of office)
- General Counsel
- Inspector General

=== Judicial branch ===
- 3 to 7 Judges of the United States Court of Appeals for Veterans Claims (15-year terms of office)

== Former Senate-confirmed positions ==
There are a number of positions that required Senate confirmation of appointees in the past, but do not today. The Presidential Appointment Efficiency and Streamlining Act of 2011 (Pub. L. 112–166 (text) (PDF)), signed into law on August 10, 2012, eliminates the requirement of Senate approval for 163 positions, allowing the president alone to appoint persons to these positions: Parts of the act went into effect immediately, while other parts took effect on October 9, 2012, 60 days after enactment.

- Department of Agriculture:
  - Assistant Secretary for Administration,
  - Administrator of the Rural Utilities Services
  - all members of the Board of Directors of the Commodity Credit Corporation (7)
- Department of Commerce:
  - Chief Scientist of the National Oceanic and Atmospheric Administration
- Department of Defense:
  - All members of the National Security Education Board (6)
  - Director of the Selective Service System
- Department of Education:
  - Assistant Secretary for Management
  - Commissioner for Education Statistics
- Department of Health and Human Services:
  - Assistant Secretary for Public Affairs
- Department of Homeland Security:
  - Director of the Office for Domestic Preparedness
  - Assistant Administrator for Grant Programs, Federal Emergency Management Administration (FEMA)
  - Administrator of the U.S. Fire Administration
  - Director of the Office of Counternarcotics Enforcement
  - Chief Medical Officer
  - Assistant Secretary for Health Affairs
  - Assistant Secretary for Legislative Affairs
  - Assistant Secretary for Public Affairs
- Housing and Urban Development:
  - Assistant Secretary for Public Affairs
- Department of Justice:
  - Director of the Bureau of Justice Statistics
  - Director of the Bureau of Justice Assistance
  - Director of the National Institute of Justice
  - Administrator of the Office of Juvenile Justice and Delinquency Prevention
  - Director of the Office for Victims of Crime
- Department of Labor:
  - Assistant Secretary for Administration and Management
  - Assistant Secretary for Public Affairs
  - Director of the Women's Bureau
- Department of State
  - Assistant Secretary for Public Affairs
  - Assistant Secretary for Administration
- Department of Transportation:
  - Assistant Secretary for Budget and Programs
  - Assistant Secretary for Administration
  - Deputy Administrator of the Federal Aviation Administration
  - Administrator of the Saint Lawrence Seaway Development Corporation
- Department of the Treasury:
  - Assistant Secretary for Public Affairs
  - Assistant Secretary for Management
  - Treasurer of the United States
- Department of Veterans Affairs:
  - Assistant Secretary for Management
  - Assistant Secretary for Human Resources and Administration
  - Assistant Secretary for Public and Intergovernmental Affairs
  - Assistant Secretary for Operations, Security, and Preparedness
- Appalachian Regional Commission:
  - Alternative Federal Co-Chairman
- Council of Economic Advisers:
  - all members (2), except the Chairperson
- Corporation for National and Community Service:
  - Managing directors (2)
- National Council on Disability:
  - All members, including the Chairperson
- National Museum and Library Services Boards:
  - all members
- National Science Foundation:
  - all Board members
- Office of National Drug Control Policy:
  - Deputy Directors
- Office of Navajo and Hopi Indian Relocation:
  - Commissioner
- United States Agency for International Development (USAID):
  - Assistant Administrator for Management
- Community Development Financial Institution Fund:
  - Administrator
- Mississippi River Commission:
  - all Commissioners (7)
- National Board for Education Sciences:
  - all members (15)
- National Institute for Literacy Advisory Board:
  - all members (10)
- Board of Trustees of the Institute of American Indian and Alaska Native Culture and Arts Development:
  - all members (13)
- United States Public Health Service Commissioned Corps:
  - all appointments and promotions (except Surgeon General)
- National Oceanic and Atmospheric Administration Commissioned Officer Corps:
  - all appointments and promotions

The act also eliminated the positions of Assistant Secretary of Defense for Networks and Information Integration and Assistant Secretary of Defense for Public Affairs.

== See also ==
- Executive Schedule
- Number of United States political appointments by agency
- United States Government Policy and Supporting Positions
