= List of Department of Energy appointments by Joe Biden =

Below is a list of nominations and appointments to the Department of Energy by Joe Biden, the 46th president of the United States. As of June 21, 2024, according to tracking by The Washington Post and Partnership for Public Service, 17 nominees have been confirmed, 0 nominees are being considered by the Senate, and 9 positions do not have nominees.

== Color key ==
Denotes appointees awaiting Senate confirmation.

Denotes appointees serving in an acting capacity.

Denotes appointees who have left office or offices which have been disbanded.

== Leadership ==
Office	Nominee	Assumed office	Left office
— Secretary of Energy	Jennifer Granholm	February 25, 2021 (Confirmed February 25, 2021, 64–35)	—
— Deputy Secretary of Energy	David Turk	March 25, 2021 (Confirmed March 24, 2021, 98–2)	—

== Office of the Secretary ==
Office	Nominee	Assumed office	Left office
— General Counsel of Energy	Samuel T. Walsh	August 11, 2021 (Confirmed August 9, 2021 by voice vote)	—
— Assistant Secretary of Energy (Congressional and Intergovernmental Affairs)	Ali Nouri	June 23, 2021 (Confirmed June 22, 2021 by voice vote)	July 2023
— Assistant Secretary of Energy (International Affairs)	Andrew Light	August 12, 2021 (Confirmed August 11, 2021 by voice vote)	—
— Director of the Office of Economic Impact and Diversity	Shalanda Baker	August 1, 2022 (Confirmed June 7, 2022, 54–45)	June 21, 2024
Advanced Research Projects Agency–Energy
— Director of ARPA-E	Evelyn Wang	January 9, 2023 (Confirmed December 22, 2022 by voice vote)	—
Energy Information Administration
— Administrator of the Energy Information Administration	Joseph DeCarolis	April 11, 2022 (Confirmed March 31, 2022 by voice vote)	—
Federal Energy Regulatory Commission
— Chair of the Federal Energy Regulatory Commission	Willie L. Phillips	February 9, 2024	–
— Chair of the Federal Energy Regulatory Commission	Richard Glick	January 21, 2021	January 3, 2023
— Commissioner of the Federal Energy Regulatory Commission	Willie L. Phillips	December 3, 2021 (Confirmed November 16, 2021 by voice vote)	–
— Commissioner of the Federal Energy Regulatory Commission	David Rosner	June 17, 2024 (Confirmed June 12, 2024, 67–27)	–
— Commissioner of the Federal Energy Regulatory Commission	Lindsay See	June 28, 2024 (Confirmed June 12, 2024, 83–12)	–
— Commissioner of the Federal Energy Regulatory Commission	Judy Chang	July 15, 2024 (Confirmed June 13, 2024, 63–33)	–

== Office of the Under Secretary for Infrastructure ==
Office	Nominee	Assumed office	Left office
— Under Secretary of Energy (Infrastructure)	David W. Crane	June 14, 2023 (Confirmed June 7, 2023, 56–43)	—

== Office of the Undersecretary for Science ==
Office	Nominee	Assumed office	Left office
— Under Secretary of Energy (Science)	Geraldine Richmond	November 15, 2021 (Confirmed November 4, 2021 by voice vote)	—
— Assistant Secretary of Energy (Electricity)	Gene Rodrigues	January 9, 2023 (Confirmed December 21, 2022 by voice vote)	—
— Assistant Secretary of Energy (Fossil Energy and Carbon Management)	Brad Crabtree	May 5, 2022 (Confirmed April 28, 2022 by voice vote)	—
— Assistant Secretary of Energy (Nuclear Energy)	Kathryn Huff	May 11, 2022 (Confirmed May 5, 2022, 80–11)	May 3, 2024
— Director of the Office of Science	Asmeret Berhe	May 19, 2022 (Confirmed May 10, 2022, 54–45)	March 28, 2024

== Office of the Undersecretary for Nuclear Security ==
Office	Nominee	Assumed office	Left office
— Under Secretary of Energy (Nuclear Security) & Administrator of the National Nuclear Security Administration	Jill Hruby	July 26, 2021 (Confirmed July 22, 2021, 79–16)	—
— Principal Deputy Administrator of the National Nuclear Security Administration	Frank Rose	August 2, 2021 (Confirmed July 29, 2021 by voice vote)	April 30, 2024
— Deputy Administrator of the National Nuclear Security Administration (Defense Programs)	Marvin Adams	April 11, 2022 (Confirmed April 6, 2022 by voice vote)	—
— Deputy Administrator of the National Nuclear Security Administration (Defense Nuclear Nonproliferation)	Corey Hinderstein	December 6, 2021 (Confirmed November 30, 2021 by voice vote)	—

== Withdrawn nominations ==
Office	Appointee	Announced	Withdrawn	Notes
— Assistant Secretary of Energy (Electricity)	Maria Robinson	September 22, 2021	June 8, 2022	
— Chairman and Commissioner of the Federal Energy Regulatory Commission	Richard Glick (Reappointment)	May 20, 2022	January 3, 2023	
— Assistant Secretary of Energy (Energy, Efficiency, and Renewable Energy)	Jeff Marootian	July 21, 2022	September 7, 2023	

== See also ==
- Cabinet of Joe Biden, for the vetting process undergone by top-level roles including advice and consent by the Senate
- List of executive branch 'czars' e.g. Special Advisor to the President
- Current organisational chart (March 2022)

== Notes ==
Confirmation votes

Confirmations by roll call vote

Confirmations by voice vote
