= Settlement Commission =

Settlement Commission or Colonization Commission may refer to:

- Royal Prussian Settlement Commission, in the provinces of Posen and West Prussia
- Foreign Claims Settlement Commission, USA
- Income Tax Settlement Commission, India
- Tidelands Settlement Commission (see Bill Dodd)
- Greek Refugee Settlement Commission (see Henry Morgenthau, Sr.)
- Soldier Settlement Commission, Australia
- South Australian Colonization Commission
