= Carl Kunasek =

American politician (1932–2026)

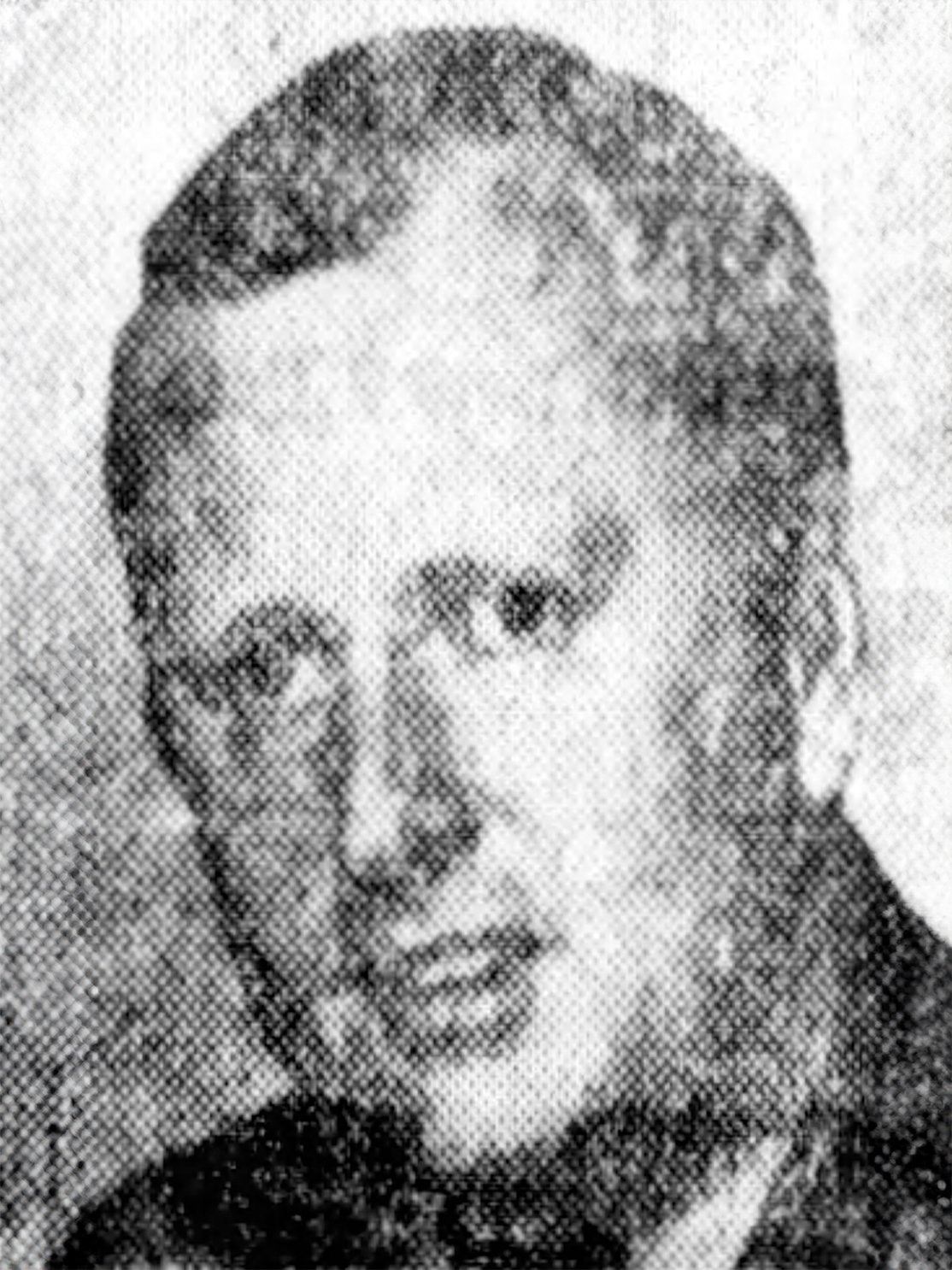
- Kunasek in 1974

Chair of the Arizona Corporation Commission
- In office 1994–2001
- Preceded by: Tracey A. Bardorff
- Succeeded by: Donald Lindholm

President of the Arizona Senate
- In office 1987–1989
- Preceded by: Stan Turley
- Succeeded by: Bob Usdane

Member of the Arizona Senate from the 21st district
- In office 1983–1989
- Preceded by: Richard Kimball
- Succeeded by: Jerry Gillespie

Member of the Arizona House of Representatives from the 30th district
- In office 1973–1983 Serving with James J. Sossaman
- Preceded by: Stan Turley; Jim L. Cooper
- Succeeded by: Mark Killian

Personal details
- Born: 1932 Omaha, Nebraska, U.S.
- Died: July 20, 2026 (aged 94)
- Party: Republican
- Children: Andy Kunasek (son); Karrin Taylor Robson (daughter)
- Education: Creighton University

Carl James Kunasek (1932 – July 20, 2026) was an American politician who served as a member of the Arizona House of Representatives and the Arizona Senate. From 1994 to 2001, he was chair of the Arizona Corporation Commission.

== Background ==
Kunasek was born in Nebraska in 1932. He graduated from Creighton University.

Kunasek died on July 20, 2026, at the age of 94.

== Career ==
Kunasek was first elected to the Arizona House of Representatives in 1972. He was re-elected in 1974, 1976, 1978 and 1980. He was then a member of the Arizona Senate from 1983 to 1989, serving as president of the Senate from 1987 to 1989. He was defeated for re-election in the Republican primary in 1988 by Jerry Gillespie. President George H. W. Bush appointed Kunasek as commissioner of the Office of Navajo and Hopi Indian Relocation in 1990. In 1994, Kunasek was elected to head the Arizona Corporation Commission and remained in the position until 2001.

Arizona House of Representatives
Preceded by Stan Turley; Jim L. Cooper	Member of the Arizona House of Representatives from the 30th district 1973–1983; Served alongside: James J. Sossaman	Succeeded by Mark Killian
Arizona Senate
Preceded by Richard Kimball	Member of the Arizona Senate from the 21st district 1983–1989	Succeeded by Jerry Gillespie
Political offices
Preceded by Stan Turley	President of the Arizona Senate; 1987–1989	Succeeded by Bob Usdane
Preceded by Tracey A. Bardorff	Chair of the Arizona Corporation Commission; 1994–2001	Succeeded by Donald Lindholm
