= Schedule Policy/Career =

United States civil service job classification

Schedule Policy/Career (also known as Schedule P/C or by its former name Schedule F) is a job classification for appointments in the excepted service of the United States federal civil service for permanent policy-related positions. The purpose of the provision is to increase the president's control over the federal career civil service by removing their civil service protections and making them easier to dismiss, which proponents stated would increase flexibility and accountability to elected officials. It was widely criticized as providing a means to retaliate against federal officials for political reasons, impede the effective functioning of government, and creating risk to democracy.

The classification, then known as Schedule F, existed briefly at the end of the first Trump administration during 2020 and 2021, but was never fully implemented and no one was appointed to it before it was repealed at the beginning of the Biden administration. In April 2024, the Biden administration adopted a regulation that would prevent most of the effects of a reinstatement of Schedule F.

It was reinstated as Schedule Policy/Career at the beginning of the second Trump administration in 2025, and an updated rule allowing reclassifications was issued in February 2026. That June, 8,000 federal employees were reclassified as Policy/Career appointments.

== Characteristics ==
The legal basis for the Schedule Policy/Career appointment is a section of the Civil Service Reform Act of 1978 (5 U.S.C. § 7511(b)(2)), which exempts from civil service protections federal employees "whose position has been determined to be of a confidential, policy-determining, policy-making or policy-advocating character". The provision had been little noticed and unused before its application by the original Schedule F order.

The text of the 2020 and 2025 versions of the executive order are nearly identical, with some minor amendments made by the latter. The stated purpose of the order was to increase flexibility in hiring and firing to improve performance management and accountability. The Civil Service Rules and Regulations do not cover employees within the Policy/Career classification, including due process and possibly collective bargaining rights. It would also have streamlined hiring for these positions, since a competitive examination would not be required.

However, appointees cannot be dismissed based on certain protected statuses, such as whistleblower status, partisan affiliation, or for claiming discrimination or harassment. The 2025 version added language making failure to faithfully implement administration policies to be grounds for dismissal, while stating that appointees "are not required to personally or politically support the current President or the policies of the current administration."

The executive order also provided transition procedures for transferring covered positions out of the competitive service into a Policy/Career appointment, by which executive agency heads must petition the Director of the Office of Personnel Management (OPM) with a list of positions to be converted with a written rationale. The OPM Director had the sole power to decide whether to grant the petition.

The Policy/Career classification includes "positions of a confidential, policy-determining, policy-making, or policy-advocating character not normally subject to change as a result of a Presidential transition". They are distinguished from Schedule C appointments, which cover policy-making positions that do change with the presidential transition. The executive orders list several characteristics of jobs that may fall under the Policy/Career classification:

- substantive participation in advocacy, development, or formulation of policy, especially of regulations and guidance
- substantive policy-related work in an agency or component that primarily focuses on policy
- the supervision of attorneys
- substantial discretion to determine how the agency exercises functions committed to it by law
- working with non-public policy proposals or deliberations generally covered by deliberative process privilege, and either:
  - directly reporting to or regularly working with an individual appointed by either the president, or by an agency head paid at the GS-13 level or higher, or
  - working in the executive secretariat of the agency or component
- conducting certain collective bargaining negotiations on the agency's behalf
- supervising other Policy/Career employees (added in the 2025 version)
- other duties deemed appropriate by the Director of the Office of Personnel Management (added in the 2025 version)

According to OPM guidance on the original version, these provisions were guidelines, as not all positions covered by them were required to be converted to Policy/Career appointments, and positions not covered by them may have been converted. The provisions were broad enough to include many scientists, attorneys, regulators, public health experts, and others in senior roles. The estimated number of employees they covered ranged from tens of thousands to hundreds of thousands.

== History ==
=== Planning ===
The idea for the Schedule F appointment was devised by James Sherk, a member of the advisory Domestic Policy Council who was seeking ways to prevent career civil service employees from resisting President Donald Trump's agenda. In January 2019, while searching through Title 5 of the United States Code, which contains provisions on civil service protections, he came across 5 U.S.C. § 7511, and brought it to the attention of the White House Counsel's Office.

The executive order was drafted secretly over the following months and was completed by late spring of 2019. However, due to large agency workloads, it was decided to delay issuing it until 2020, which was further delayed by the COVID-19 pandemic. Trump was reportedly motivated by a desire to get even with recalcitrant officials after his first impeachment trial, which concluded in February 2020.

=== 2020 implementation effort ===
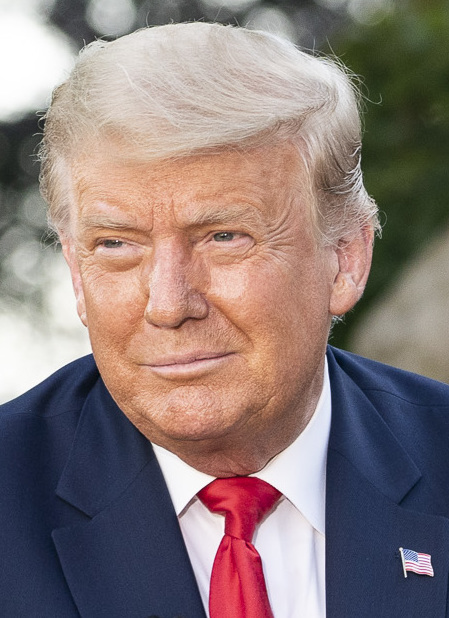
President Donald Trump at an event on October 20, 2020, the day before he signed the executive order creating Schedule F

Schedule F was created by Executive Order 13957 on October 21, 2020. The executive order had required heads of all federal agencies to submit a preliminary list of positions that could be reclassified as Schedule F by January 19, 2021, the day before the next presidential inauguration, to John D. McEntee, the director of the Presidential Personnel Office.

By the January 19 deadline, two agencies had submitted their lists. The Office of Management and Budget submitted a list of 140 position types, of which 136 were approved by OPM, which would have affected 415 of the agency's 610 employees. Most of the affected employees were in program examination, digital services, and policy analysis positions. However, some other positions, such as administrative assistants, office managers, and IT workers, were also labeled as policy-making positions. However, the necessary administrative steps were not taken, and no one was actually reclassified. The International Boundary and Water Commission submitted a list of five of its 234 employees, but the executive order was revoked before OPM could approve them.

Five agencies had prepared draft lists that were not yet ready for submission. The Federal Energy Regulatory Commission determined more than half of its positions met the criteria for reclassification, while the Equal Employment Opportunity Commission, Environmental Protection Agency, Federal Trade Commission, and OPM itself each had draft lists that would have reclassified around or less than 10% of their employees.

Six agencies determined that they would not reclassify any positions: the Federal Maritime Commission, Federal Retirement Thrift Investment Board, National Archives and Records Administration, National Transportation Safety Board, National Labor Relations Board, and AmeriCorps.

=== Repeal and efforts against reinstatement ===
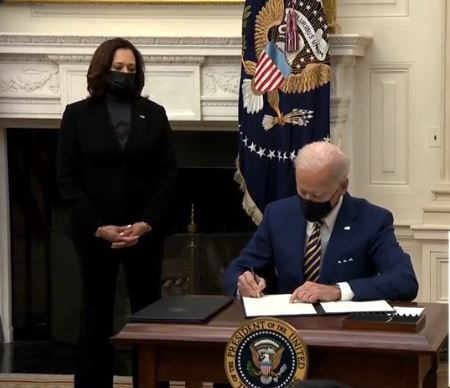
President Joe Biden signing two executive orders including the one abolishing Schedule F

It was repealed by President Biden through Executive Order 14003 on January 22, 2021, the third day of his administration. No employees had been moved to the new classification.

House Democrats introduced a bill in the 116th Congress, the Saving the Civil Service Act, that would halt the executive order's implementation and restore any converted or dismissed Schedule F appointees back into competitive service positions. There was also discussion of adding the same provisions to either the National Defense Authorization Act for Fiscal Year 2021 or a continuing resolution for fiscal year 2021 appropriations. However, no provision regarding Schedule F was included in the Consolidated Appropriations Act, 2021.

The Preventing a Patronage System Act was introduced at the beginning of the 117th Congress by Democrat Gerry Connolly of Virginia. Although it was included in the House's version of the National Defense Authorization Act for Fiscal Year 2023, it was removed from the final bill and did not become law. A similar bill, the Saving the Civil Service Act, was introduced in the 118th United States Congress, but did not pass before the end of the Congressional term.

In April 2024, the Biden administration put into effect a regulation named "Upholding Civil Service Protections and Merit System Principles" (89 FR 24982) that allows employees to keep existing job protections even if their positions were reclassified, preventing most of the effects of a reinstatement of Schedule F. While the regulation could be repealed by a future administration, it would delay any implementation by several months.

=== Reinstatement ===
In mid-2022, it was reported that there were plans to reinstate the Schedule F provisions if Trump were elected to a second term, including identifying around 50,000 workers who could be reclassified. In March 2023, reinstatement of Schedule F was included at a top of a list of proposals from the Donald Trump 2024 presidential campaign, while Ron DeSantis had written approvingly of it in his book The Courage to Be Free. The next month, it was reported that Project 2025, a coalition led by The Heritage Foundation, was preparing a personnel database that could be used to fill up to 20,000 potential Schedule F appointments in a future Republican administration. Much of Project 2025 and Agenda 47 relies on Trump reenacting Schedule F, which he stated his intent to do.

On January 20, 2025, his first day in office, Trump signed Executive Order 14171, "Restoring Accountability to Policy-influencing Positions Within the Federal Workforce," which revoked Biden's Executive Order 14003 and reinstated the original Executive Order 13957 with a few amendments, most notably renaming it from "Schedule F" to "Schedule Policy/Career". It also removed language exempting the positions from the competitive hiring process, and moved final decision-making authority for conversions to the president, instead of the OPM director. It also directed the OPM director to rescind the "Upholding Civil Service Protections and Merit System Principles" regulation and to hold it "inoperative and without effect" until it is rescinded. In a memo to agency heads, Acting OPM Director Charles Ezell stated that the President had Constitutional authority to rescind regulations about federal personnel without following the Administrative Procedure Act, a stance that was considered likely to lead to litigation.

During the first week of April, the National Oceanic and Atmospheric Administration informed employees who were on a preliminary list to be converted to a Policy/Career appointment. At the time, the Department of Commerce was reviewing lists submitted by its component agencies that contained thousands of employees, which were reported to include most GS-15 and many GS-14 employees. Later in April, it was reported that OPM was estimating that 50,000 workers, or 2% of the federal civilian workforce, would be reclassified into Policy/Career appointments, and that it was preparing to publish a proposed rule allowing the reclassifications. The proposed rule received over 40,000 public comments, 94% of which were opposed to the policy.

In February 2026, the finalized rule was issued that would allow the reclassifications, called "Improving Performance, Accountability and Responsiveness in the Civil Service" (91 FR 5580). On June 3 that year, Trump signed the executive order "Implementing Schedule Policy/Career in the excepted service", which reclassified around 8,000 federal employees into Policy/Career appointments. Nearly all of the positions were at or above the GS-15 level, and generally included officials in leadership, human resources, and senior program managers and grantmakers, regulation writers, policy developers, and attorneys.

== Response ==
=== To 2020–2021 version ===
The creation of Schedule F was controversial. Critics feared a transition from a non-partisan government of subject-matter experts to one where partisan or presidential loyalty tests had a role in the hiring process. At the time, it was estimated that tens or hundreds of thousands of career employees could lose their civil service protections including union representation, and that it would increase the number of political appointments by a factor of ten. Conversely, there was concern that political appointees of Trump, whose appointments are supposed to expire at the end of his term, could "burrow in" by being converted to positions that are harder to dismiss.

Rebecca Beitsch, writing for The Hill, wrote that unions were criticizing Trump's executive order as "the biggest change to federal workforce protections in a century, converting many federal workers to 'at will' employment." The National Treasury Employees Union sued the administration in the United States District Court for the District of Columbia over the executive order, arguing that the administration did not properly justify it satisfied the legal requirement that the changes are "necessary" and as "conditions of good administration warrant."

An official statement from Infectious Diseases Society of America (IDSA) further stated that the executive order was "alarming". The six authors, all infectious disease specialists and epidemiologists, wrote:

We rely on the judgment of civil service experts to lead responses against the pandemic, inform the public, drive research, update guidance and review data supporting the use and distribution of vaccines and treatments to address the impacts of COVID-19. Replacing our scientists and public health experts with politically motivated staff will reduce our ability to respond, and reduce public confidence in our response, to COVID-19 and other public health crises.

On October 26, 2020, Ronald Sanders, the chair of the Federal Salary Council, resigned. Writing that he was a "lifelong Republican" who prided himself on having "served three Democratic and three Republican presidents," Sanders sent a letter to John D. McEntee, Presidential Personnel Office director, characterizing Executive Order 13957, which had purported to hold federal employees more accountable, as a transparent attempt to fill the government with those loyal to the president at the expense of experts loyal to the Constitution and the rule of law.

A coalition of 28 labor unions supported Congressional action to block the Schedule F executive order.

Rachel Greszler, a fellow at The Heritage Foundation, said: "I really think that the order is unlikely to affect many of those workers because the overwhelming majority of federal employees are upstanding individuals, they're providing valuable knowledge and experience that the managers in the agency heads don't want to lose. It's only those bad apples who are derelict in their duties, or they're outright trying to thwart their agency's actions that would need to worry about their job security."

==== Congress ====
House Democrats also requested documents about the creation of the executive order.

Representative Don Beyer (D-VA) said, "it's an attempt to redefine the civil service as a political arm of the presidency rather than public servants who work for the American people", leading to "open cronyism that does not benefit the country, but the president." Former federal human resources executive Jeff Neal called the order "the most direct assault on the career civil service since the passage of the Pendleton Act in 1883," which had created the merit-based federal civil service.

Representative James Comer (R-KY) supported the change, saying that "our founding fathers never envisioned a massive unelected, unaccountable federal government with the power to create policies that impact Americans' everyday lives... President Trump has long pledged to take on this bureaucracy and restore power to the people by draining the swamp."

=== To potential reinstatement ===
Some legal experts have argued that it would create chaos in the civil service, which was formed by the 1883 Pendleton Civil Service Reform Act to have a more professional workforce and end political bias and the corruption of the spoils system; and last overhauled in the Carter administration through the Civil Service Reform Act of 1978. Other critics have argued that Schedule F would threaten democracy, as it would make civil servants beholden to the party in power rather than the American people as a whole.

In the wake of Trump's victory in the 2024 presidential election, the American Federation of Government Employees, National Federation of Federal Employees, and other unions representing federal workers expressed fear and resolution against the President-Elect's policies, though many did not mention it in their congratulatory message. Two days after the election, Heritage Foundation president Kevin Roberts expressed support for Trump for, among other signature campaign-promises, his pledge to, "dismantle the deep state."

=== To 2025 version ===
On January 21, 2025, the day after the reinstatement of Schedule Policy/Career, the National Treasury Employees Union filed a lawsuit in the U.S. District Court for the District of Columbia seeking to stop its implementation. They argued that the intent of Congress in the Civil Service Reform Act of 1978 was that the exemption for policy-related positions is specific for non-permanent positions already covered under Schedule C, rather than career positions, and that it does not meet the legal standard that "conditions of good administration warrant" it as an exception to due-process career protections. They also argued that it violates the Administrative Procedure Act by ignoring existing OPM regulations. A similar lawsuit was filed by the American Federation of Government Employees and the American Federation of State, County and Municipal Employees the following week.
