= John Sullins =

John Sullins may refer to:

- John Sullins (football player) (born 1969), a former American football linebacker
- John P. Sullins, American philosopher
- John P. Sullins, a former president of Arkansas Northeastern College
