= Andrew Light =

American philosopher

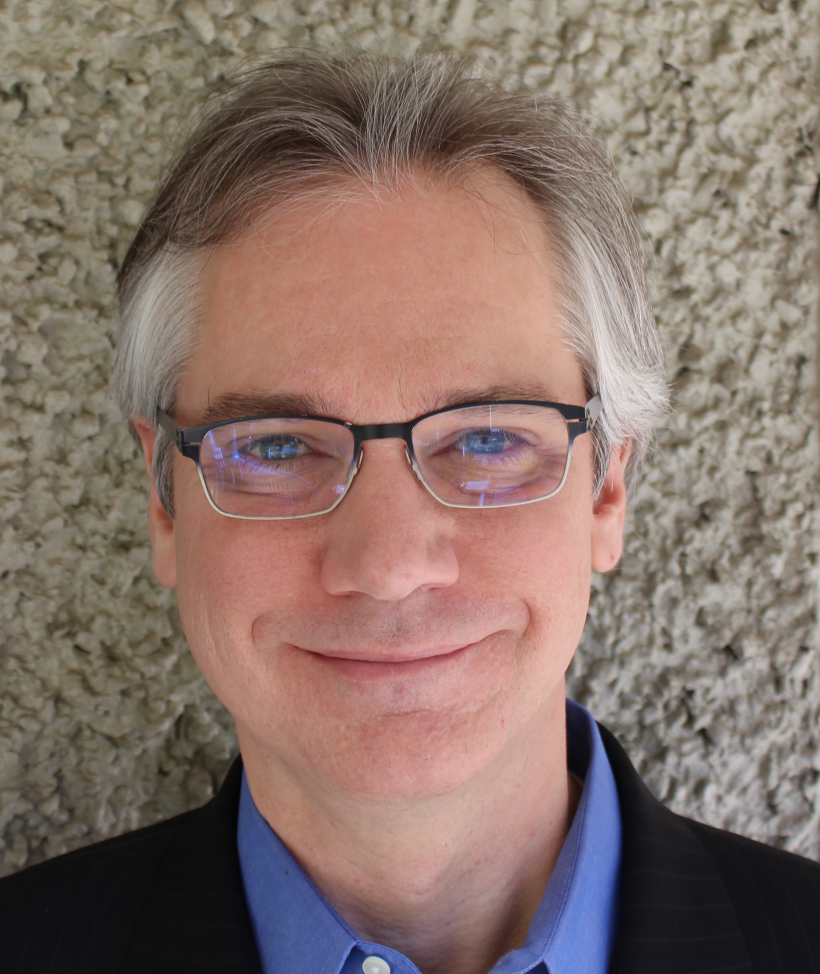
- Spouse: Juliet Eilperin
- Parent(s): Elizabeth J. "Gina" Light (mother), Ron Light (father)

Academic background
- Education: University of California, Riverside (PhD), Mercer University (BA)

Academic work
- Sub-discipline: International Energy and Climate Policy and Diplomacy, Advanced Clean Energy Technology Cooperation and Development, Environmental Policy, Ethics
- Institutions: George Mason University (2008-), University of Washington, Seattle (2005-2008), New York University (2000-2005), SUNY Binghamton (1998-2000), University of Montana (1996-1998)
- Doctoral students: John P. Sullins

Andrew Light is an American philosopher and Distinguished University Professor of Public Policy, Philosophy, and Atmospheric Sciences at George Mason University. He is known for his works on the environmental policy and ethics. Light served as Assistant Secretary of Energy for International Affairs in the Biden Administration.

== Books ==
- The Routledge Companion to Environmental Ethics, with Benjamin Hale and Lydia Lawhon (London: Routledge Press, 2022).
- Environmental Values, with John O’Neill and Alan Holland. (London: Routledge Press, 2008).
- Reel Arguments: Film, Philosophy, and Social Criticism. (Boulder, CO: Westview Press, 2003)
- The Aesthetics of Everyday Life, Andrew Light and Jonathan M. Smith (eds.) (New York: Columbia University Press, 2005)
