= Karrin Taylor Robson =

American lawyer and politician (born 1965)

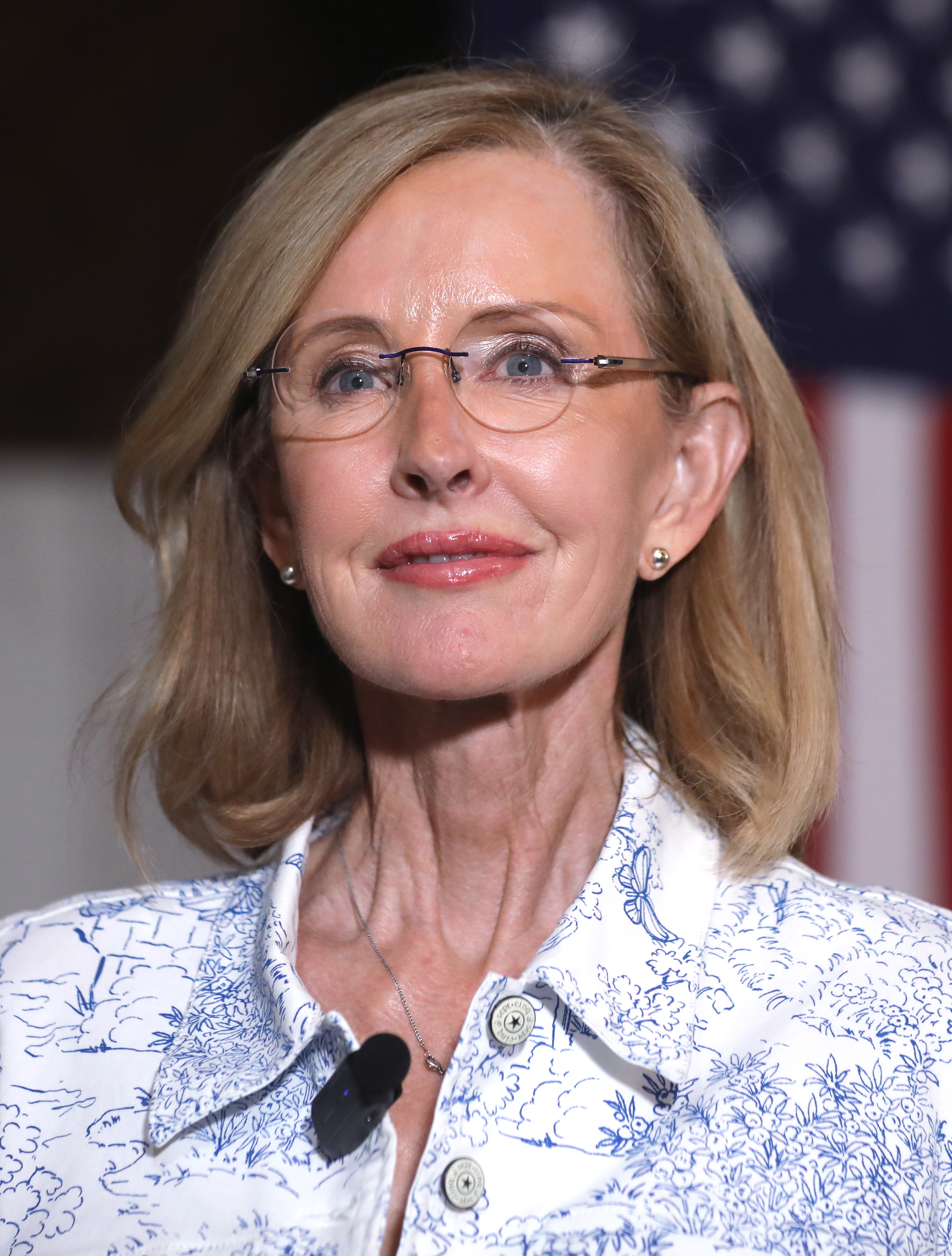
- Robson in 2024

Member of the Arizona Board of Regents
- In office July 2017 – July 2021
- Appointed by: Doug Ducey
- Preceded by: Greg Patterson
- Succeeded by: Bob Herbold; Jessica Pacheco

Personal details
- Born: Karrin Margaret Kunasek; July 28, 1964 (age 62) Mesa, Arizona, U.S.
- Party: Republican
- Spouse: Edward Robson (m. 2017)
- Children: 4
- Relatives: Carl Kunasek (father); Andy Kunasek (brother)
- Education: Arizona State University, Tempe (BA, JD)

Karrin Margaret Taylor Robson (/ˈroʊbsən/ ROBE-sən, née Kunasek, born February 7, 1965) is an American attorney, businesswoman, and politician. A member of the Republican Party, she was a member of the Arizona Board of Regents from 2017 until 2021, appointed by Governor Doug Ducey.

In 2022, Taylor Robson ran in the Republican primary for Arizona's gubernatorial election, placing second to Kari Lake, who was endorsed by Donald Trump. In 2025, she would announced another gubernatorial campaign for 2026, this time with the endorsement of Trump. Several months later, Trump co-endorsed one of Taylor Robson's Republican opponents, Andy Biggs. She withdrew her candidacy in February 2026.

== Early life ==
Born Karrin Margaret Kunasek, she was raised in Mesa, Arizona. The Kunasek family is prominent in Arizona Republican politics. Her father, Carl Kunasek, was president of the Arizona State Senate and a member of the Arizona Corporation Commission. Her mother was Kathryn Frances Kunasek (née Ryan) (1935–2020). Her brother, Andy, was a member of the Maricopa County Board of Supervisors from 1997 to 2017.

== Education and career ==
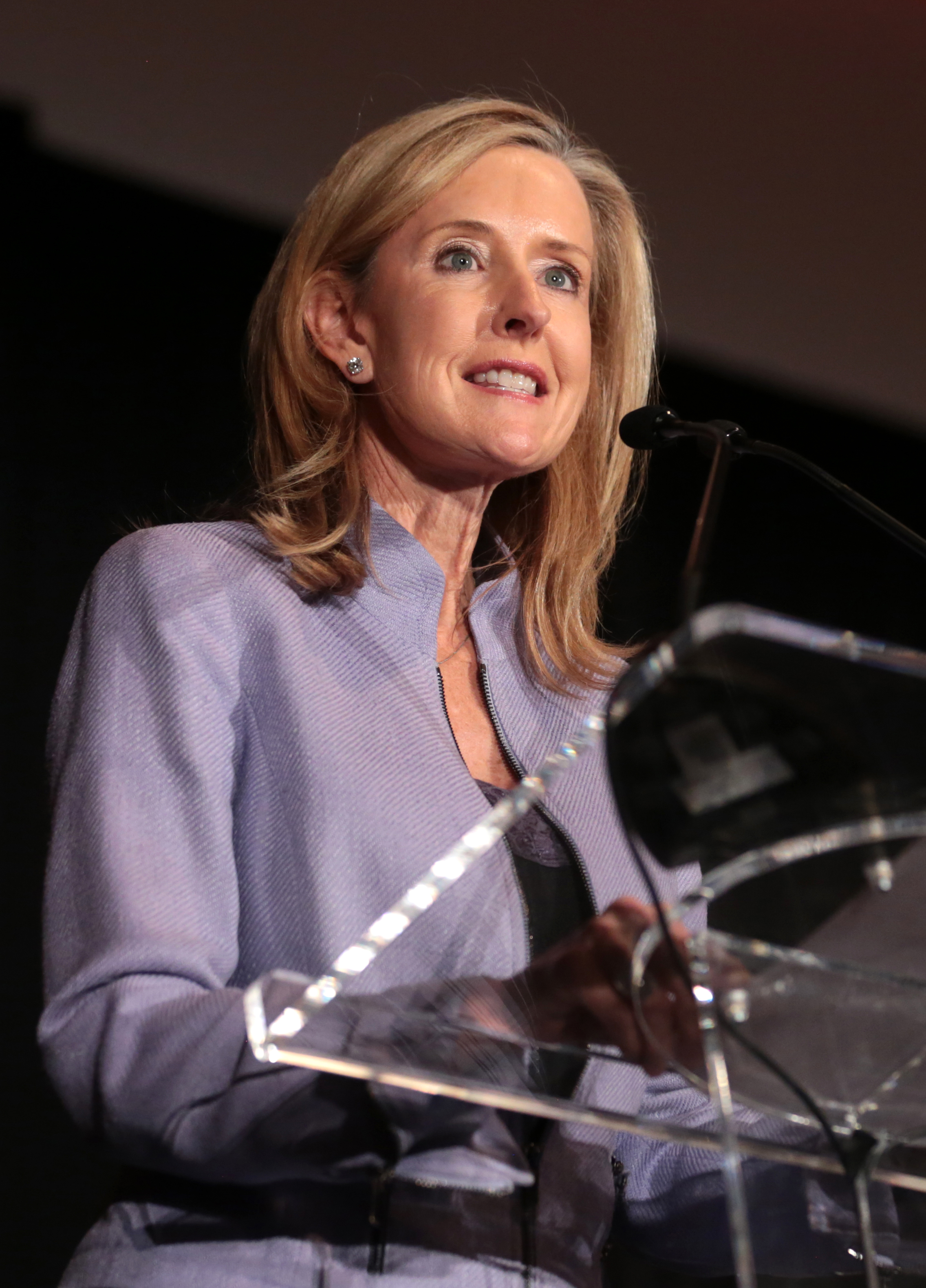
Robson in 2018

Taylor Robson earned her Bachelor of Arts in history and political science from Arizona State University (ASU) in 1988, where she served as Student Body President and was a member of Kappa Kappa Gamma Sorority. After graduating college, Taylor Robson was a staff assistant for President Ronald Reagan's economic policy council, and a staff assistant for the Office of Cabinet Affairs in the administration of George H. W. Bush. Taylor Robson left the White House in order to attend law school. She earned a Juris Doctor from ASU's Sandra Day O'Connor College of Law in 1994.

Taylor Robson was executive vice president of Scottsdale, Arizona-based DMB Associates, a real estate developer. She left DMB in early 2016. Taylor Robson was also a principal with the law firm of Biskind, Hunt & Taylor, P.L.C., focusing on real estate law, zoning, and land use. Robson founded Arizona Strategies, a land-use consulting company, and was a state lobbyist for DMB. Taylor Robson described land use law in 2020 as "really 60% politics and 40% law."

In 2005, Taylor Robson was appointed to the Air Force Chief of Staff's Civic Leader program, where she served as an unpaid advisor and liaison between Air Force leadership and the civilian community surrounding Luke Air Force Base.

Upon the death of longtime Arizona United States Senator John McCain in 2018, Taylor Robson was mentioned as a possible appointee to serve the remainder of McCain's term. Governor Doug Ducey ultimately appointed Martha McSally to fill the vacancy.

Ducey appointed Taylor Robson to the Arizona Board of Regents in June 2017 and reappointed her to a full eight-year term in 2020. She resigned from the Board in July 2021 to focus on her campaign for the Republican nomination for governor.

Taylor Robson was inducted into the Arizona Women's Hall of Fame in 2020.

=== 2022 gubernatorial campaign ===
In 2019, Taylor Robson publicly considered a potential 2022 candidacy for governor of Arizona. She formally announced her candidacy for the Republican nomination in May 2021. (Ducey, the incumbent, could not run again due to term limits.) She described herself as a "lifelong conservative Republican" and stated her opposition to the policies of the Biden administration. Her candidacy was endorsed by former Arizona governors Fife Symington and Jan Brewer, Ducey, the outgoing governor; Arizona Senate president Karen Fann; and Americans for Prosperity. Taylor Robson was also endorsed by former Arizona Republican congressman Matt Salmon, who ran for the gubernatorial nomination but withdrew from the race in late June 2022, and by Mike Pence, the former vice president under Donald Trump. By contrast, Trump endorsed Kari Lake, Taylor Robson's chief rival, and Trump allies. In 2021, Taylor Robson's campaign raised $3.7 million, of which about half was contributed by Taylor Robson.

During her campaign for the Republican primary nomination, Taylor Robson refused to say whether, if she had been governor, she would have certified the results of the 2020 presidential election in Arizona, in which Joe Biden defeated Donald Trump. She questioned the legitimacy of the election, asserting that "the elections weren't fair" and that "our election was absolutely not fair." She accused "liberal judges" of "changing the rules late in the game."

During her campaign, Taylor Robson said that she would enforce Arizona's pre-Roe abortion ban, which would criminalize the action in most circumstances. 2024 Arizona Proposition 139, a constitutional amendment that was approved by voters on November 5, 2024, established a right to abortion in Arizona in the Constitution of Arizona until fetal viability.

=== 2026 gubernatorial campaign ===
On February 12, 2025, Robson officially announced her intent to run for governor in 2026. Donald Trump had endorsed her in December 2024, over a month before the official announcement. On April 22, Trump co-endorsed one of her opponents in the race, Andy Biggs. The following week, Chris LaCivita and Tony Fabrizio, who are political associates of Trump, quit working for Robson's campaign. The dispute between the Trump political apparatus and Robson reportedly centered on whether or not she was committed to airing advertisements highlighting Trump's endorsement. Taylor Robson dropped out of the race in February 2026.

== Personal life ==
Taylor Robson lives in Phoenix's Biltmore Area. She is married to Ed Robson, a real estate developer who is the founder and president of Robson Communities. Robson has holdings in Arizona and Texas; he is the namesake of Ed Robson Arena, a hockey stadium at his alma mater Colorado College.
