= Andy Kunasek =

American politician

Supervisor for Maricopa County, Arizona from the 3rd District
- In office September 1997 – January 1, 2017
- Preceded by: Betsey Bayless

Personal details
- Party: Republican
- Relations: Carl Kunasek (father); Karrin Taylor Robson (sister)
- Children: 3

Andrew William Kunasek is an American politician from Arizona. A member of the Republican Party, Kunaseck served on the Maricopa County Board of Supervisors representing the 3rd district from 1997 until 2017. Kunasek was first appointed to the county board in 1997 to replace Betsey Bayless, when she became secretary of state.

== Career ==
Kunasek supports selling Chase Field, home of the Arizona Diamondbacks. In a letter to team owner Ken Kendrick, Kunasek wrote "take your stupid baseball team and get out" and go back to "f–king West Virginia,"

He received a $123,110 settlement from Maricopa County after being targeted by former Sheriff Joe Arpaio and former County Attorney Andrew Thomas.

He was a noted champion of the county park system, including naming a peak in the Estrella Mountains in honor of fallen Navy Seal Charles Keating IV.

He won $21 million award following a jury verdict in a 2013 lawsuit against a developer and his family. The developer had sunk a joint business investment after the developer dumped untreated sewage and Kunasek refused to pull strings to allow the practice.
