= John P. Sullins =

American philosopher and Professor

- Awards: The Herbert A. Simon Award (IACAP)

Academic background
- Education: Binghamton University (PhD), San José State University (BS, MA)
- Thesis: Beyond Our Biology: a Computational Study of Ethics and Morality (2002)
- Doctoral advisor: Andrew Light

Academic work
- Sub-discipline: computer ethics, AI ethics, philosophy of technology, philosophical issues of artificial intelligence, cognitive science, philosophy of science, engineering ethics
- Institutions: Sonoma State University

John P. Sullins III is an American philosopher and Professor of Philosophy at Sonoma State University. He is the director of programing for the Sonoma State University Center for Ethics Law and Society (CELS). Sullins is a winner of the Herbert A. Simon Award (IACAP) and is known for his works on the computer ethics and AI ethics.

He is involved in occasional industry and government consultation involving ethical practices in technology design. He was the coauthor of IEEE Courses on Ethics and AI and Autonomous Systems as well as chairing the committee on Affective Computing for the IEEE “Ethically Aligned Design: A Vision for Prioritizing Human Well-being With Autonomous and Intelligent Systems” and co-chairs the IEEE Standards Committee P7008 - Standard for Ethically Driven Nudging for Robotic, Intelligent and Autonomous Systems. He also served as the secretary and treasurer of the Society for Philosophy and Technology for twenty-three years.

== Books ==
- The Great Philosophical Objections to AI: The History and Legacy of the AI Wars, with Eric Dietrich, Chris Fields, Van Heuveln Bram, and Robin Zebrowski, Bloomsbury Academic 2021
