= Gene Rodrigues =

American lawyer and public servant

Gene Rodrigues is an American lawyer who served as Assistant Secretary of Energy (Electricity Delivery and Energy Reliability) in the United States Department of Energy.

Rodrigues was nominated by President Joe Biden on September 2, 2022 and subsequently confirmed by voice vote of the U.S. Senate on December 21, 2022. He was sworn into office by U.S. Secretary of Energy Jennifer M. Granholm on January 9, 2023. Rodrigues served as the Assistant Secretary for Electricity until his resignation to President Donald Trump, effective January 20, 2025.

== Early life and education ==
Rodrigues was born July 3, 1956, at Ashiya Air Base, Japan, to an American serviceman father and a Japanese mother who subsequently became a naturalized U.S. citizen. He earned his Bachelor of Science degree in Education from Northern Arizona University in 1980 and his Juris Doctor degree from the University of California, Hastings College of the Law (now, University of California Law San Francisco) in 1985.

== Career ==
Rodrigues worked for 23 years in clean energy policy, regulation, and programs as an executive at Southern California Edison

From 2014 to 2022, Rodrigues was vice president in the Energy, Environment, and Infrastructure practice at ICF International, a consultancy firm.

Rodrigues has held leadership positions in a number of clean energy industry nonprofit organizations, including as a board member of American Council for an Energy-Efficient Economy, as the chair of the board for the California Efficiency & Demand Management Council, and as a committee chair for the Active Efficiency initiative of the Alliance to Save Energy. Rodrigues also served as the chair of the board for the Consortium for Energy Efficiency, and as a board member of the China-U.S. Energy Efficiency Alliance, the National Association of Energy Services Companies, and California's Low-Income Oversight Board.

While at the United States Department of Energy, Rodrigues served as the senior official on the federal interagency working group for the White House Initiative on Asian Americans, Native Hawaiians, and Pacific Islanders.

== Awards ==
- Environmental Protection Agency - Climate Leadership Award for individual leadership (2012)
- Alliance to Save Energy - Charles H. Percy Award for Public Service (2022)
- California Efficiency and Demand Management Council - Art Rosenfeld Achievement Award (2024)
- California Energy Commission - California Clean Energy Hall of Fame and Lifetime Achievement Award
