= Foreign Claims Settlement Commission =

Independent governmental agency of the United States

The Foreign Claims Settlement Commission (FCSC) is a quasi-judicial, independent agency within the U.S. Department of Justice which adjudicates claims of U.S. nationals against foreign governments, either under specific jurisdiction conferred by Congress or pursuant to international claims settlement agreements. Funds for payment of the commission's awards are derived from congressional appropriations, international claims settlements, or liquidation of foreign assets in the United States by the Departments of Justice and the U.S. Treasury.

== Organization ==
The commission is composed of a chairman and two members, appointed by the president of the United States with the consent of the United States Senate. The terms are three years, but they may continue to serve on the commission until a successor takes office. The chairman serves on a full-time basis, whilst the other members serve part-time.

=== Current commissioners ===
The current commissioners as of November 19, 2026:

Position	Name	Party	Assumed office	Term expiration	Appointed by
Chair	Vacant	—	—	September 30, 2027	—
Member	Sylvia M. Becker	—N/a	September 26, 2013	September 30, 2016	Barack Obama
Member	Patrick Hovakimian	Republican	June 4, 2018	September 30, 2020	Donald Trump

=== Nominations ===
President Trump has nominated the following to fill a seat on the commission. They await Senate confirmation.

Position	Name	Party	Term expires	Replacing
Member	Andreas Borgeas	Republican	September 30, 2028	Sylvia M. Becker

== History ==
The FCSC was established in 1954 (Reorganization Plan No. 1 (5 U.S.C. App.)), when it assumed the functions of two predecessor agencies: the War Claims Commission and the International Claims Commission. The FCSC and its predecessor agencies have successfully completed 43 claims programs to resolve claims against various countries including the Federal Republic of Germany, Iran, Yugoslavia, Bulgaria, Romania, Hungary, the Soviet Union, Czechoslovakia, Poland, Italy, Cuba, China, East Germany, Vietnam, Ethiopia, Egypt, Panama, and Albania. In all, more than 660,000 claims have been adjudicated, with awards totaling in the billions of dollars.

=== Albania Claims Program ===
Pursuant to the U.S.-Albanian Claims Settlement Agreement of March 1995, the FCSC retains authority to adjudicate claims of U.S. nationals for expropriation, confiscation and other loss of property suffered at the hands of the Communist regime that seized power in Albania at the end of the Second World War. A fund of $2 million was provided by Albania under the 1995 agreement from which to pay the commission's awards, and over $1 million remains available in this fund.

=== Holocaust Claims Program ===
The United States and Germany signed an agreement on September 19, 1995, providing for reparations for certain U.S.-citizen survivors of the Holocaust, with compensation to be paid in two stages. The first stage provided for compensation for Hugo Princz and a small group of other known concentration camp survivors, through a lump-sum payment to the United States of 3 million Deutsche Mark (about $2.1 million). The second stage was to provide for compensation for additional, similarly situated claimants. Legislation passed in early 1996 authorized the commission to receive and adjudicate cases of additional claimants, a process which it completed in March 1998. Following further negotiations, the German Government paid to the United States in June 1999 an additional lump sum of 34.5 million Deutsche Mark (about $18 million) in final settlement of any and all claims of United States citizens against Germany for Nazi persecution in concentration camps, whether or not they were adjudicated by the commission. In the ensuing months, the Department of the Treasury completed the process of distributing the settlement fund to the claimants previously found eligible for awards.

=== Cuban Claims Programs ===
The commission has administered two programs for adjudication of claims against the Government of Cuba. In its First Cuban Claims Program, completed on July 6, 1972, the Commission certified 5,911 claims to the U.S. Department of State as valid claims. In August 2006 the Commission completed the administration of a second Cuban claims program, evaluating previously unadjudicated claims of U.S. citizens or corporations against the Government of Cuba for losses of real and personal property taken after May 1, 1967. The first program was conducted under the authority of Title V of the International Claims Settlement Act of 1949, as amended (22 U.S.C. § 1643 et seq.), while the second program was conducted pursuant to the commission's authority under 22 U.S.C. § 1623(a)(1)(C) to evaluate categories of claims referred to it by the Secretary of State. The second program began on August 10, 2005, and the filing deadline was February 13, 2006.

In its Second Cuban Claims Program, the commission received a total of five claims, and certified two of those claims as valid: the Claim of Starwood, Claim No. CU-2-001, Decision No. CU-2-001, in the total principal amount of $51,128,926.95 (plus 6 percent simple annual interest); and the Claim of Iraida R. Mendez, Claim No. CU-2-002, Decision No. CU-2-004, in the principal amount of $16,000.00 (plus 6 percent simple annual interest). These will be added to the claims already certified in the previous program. Although there are no funds currently available to make payment on any American claims, the purpose of the commission's certifications will be to serve as a basis for future negotiation of a claims settlement with the Government of Cuba.

=== Helms-Burton Act/Claims Against Cuba ===
The Cuban Liberty and Democratic Solidarity (LIBERTAD) Act of 1996, Public Law 104–114, known as the "Helms-Burton Act," includes as Title III a provision authorizing U.S. nationals whose Cuban property was confiscated by the Castro regime to bring federal court actions against foreign entities "trafficking" in those properties. The legislation contemplates that, with limited exceptions, the courts hearing these cases will adopt the valuations determined in awards issued by the Commission in its Cuban Claims Program, which it conducted from 1965 to 1972 under Title V of the International Claims Settlement Act of 1949, as amended (22 U.S.C. 1643 et seq.). In the course of that program the Commission certified 5,911 claims as valid, with an aggregate principal value (i.e., not including interest) of over $1.8 billion.

In cases where plaintiffs were not eligible to file claims in the commission's Cuban Claims Program, the Helms-Burton Act authorized the United States District Courts, beginning in March 1998, to receive those claims and to appoint the commission as Special Master to make determinations concerning ownership and valuation of the property at issue in the claims. Since the statute's enactment, however, Presidents Clinton, Bush and Obama have continually waived the implementation of the right to file Title III actions, citing the need to seek agreement with U.S. trading partners on policy toward Cuba; however, President Trump in 2019 lifted this waiver, leading to cases filed against cruise lines that operated within Cuba. Subsequently, the United States Supreme Court has issued rulings on several cases regarding Title III actions, particularly in Havana Docks Corp. v. Royal Caribbean Cruises (2026) and others.

=== Vietnam War Claims ===
The Commission continues to have authority under the War Claims Act of 1948, as amended, to receive, determine, and provide for the payment of any further claims that may be filed for maltreatment of U.S. servicemen and civilians held as prisoners of war or interned by a hostile force in Southeast Asia during the Vietnam War. In addition, the commission is frequently called upon to provide advice and assistance to the Department of State and Congressional offices on policy issues involving international claims and proposals for legislation to resolve classes of still-outstanding U.S. citizens' claims.

=== Guam War Claims Review Commission ===
Because of the institutional knowledge and expertise of the FCSC staff, the Department of the Interior asked for the FCSC's assistance with the Guam War Claims Review Commission, which was established in September 2003 pursuant to Public Law 107–333, approved December 16, 2002. The purpose of the Review Commission was to evaluate the treatment accorded by the U.S. Navy to claims of residents of Guam for death, physical injury, and property loss and destruction during and after the occupation of Guam by Imperial Japanese Forces during World War II, and to determine whether the compensation provided to the people of Guam was comparable to that provided under other claims statutes covering World War II losses.

The Review Commission, composed of five individuals, designated the FCSC's Chairman as its chairman, and the FCSC staff members conducted investigative research in support of the Review Commission's work. However, it is important to emphasize that this work was totally independent, and that it was carried out solely for the edification of and at the direction of the members of the Review Commission and was in no way identified with or sponsored by either the FCSC or the Department of Justice.

The Review Commission held hearings on Guam in December 2003 to take testimony of survivors of the Japanese occupation concerning their wartime and post-war experiences, and in February 2004 it held a conference in Washington, DC, to hear opinions and insights of legal experts on a variety of war claims-related issues. These efforts eventually culminated in an 82-page written report, with numerous appendices, which the Review Commission submitted on June 9, 2004, to the Secretary of the Interior, the House Committees on Resources and the Judiciary, and the Senate Committees on Energy and Natural Resources and the Judiciary. As provided by law, the Review Commission then went out of existence on July 10, 2004. It is the FCSC's understanding that the Administration has not taken a position on any of the findings and recommendations contained in the Review Commission's report.
