= Hugo Princz =

Holocaust survivor (1923 - 2001)

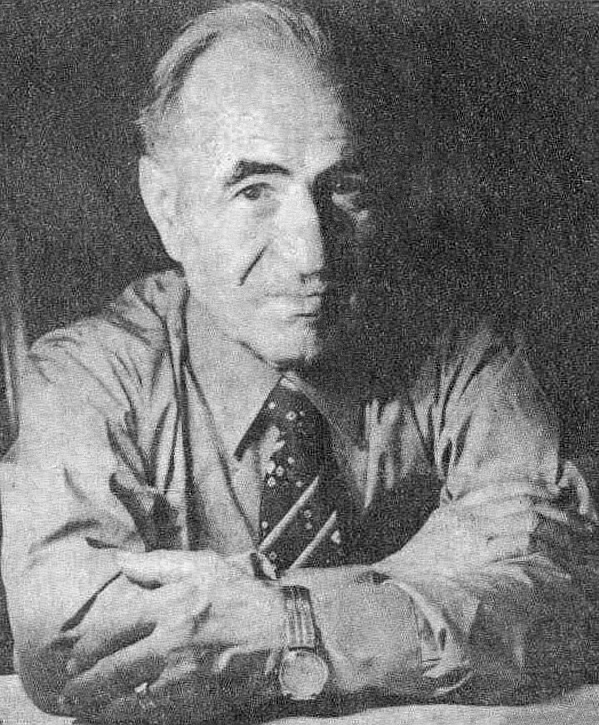
Hugo Princz

Hugo Princz (1923 – Jul 31, 2001) was a Holocaust survivor who was imprisoned in Auschwitz concentration camp in Oswiecim, Poland.

== Nazi Imprisonment ==
Princz is notable for among other things being an American citizen at the time of his imprisonment in 1940, his denial of reparations by the West German government and their successor, the government of a unified Germany, based in part to his American citizenship and his decades-long legal battle to collect a $500-a-month pension.

== History ==
Princz' father Herman was a U.S. citizen therefore his citizenship was conferred upon his children. Princz and his family who were Jewish, were living in the former Czechoslovakia in 1939, were his father worked leasing combine harvesters to Czech farmers during the harvest. Soon after the annexation of Czechoslovakia by Nazi Germany, on September 1, 1939 World War II started.

In March 1942, they were detained by the Slovak Fascist police as enemy aliens. Custody of the family was turned over to the German SS, who confiscated their American passports and other identifying papers proving their American citizenship. Instead of being swapped in a Red Cross-sponsored exchange of prisoners, as most other American civilians were, the family was taken to Majdanek.

He was uncertain of the fate of his parents Herman and Gisella and sister Irene, he believes they were murdered in Treblinka concentration camp. Another sister Yolanda was subjected to medical experiments at Auschwitz by Josef Mengele, and subsequently died. Princz along with his brothers Arthur and Alex were deported to Auschwitz where he was tattooed with the number 36707. He was leased out to I.G. Farben to work in the Buna-Werke industrial complex as a bricklayer, by the SS, as a skilled laborer for 4 Reichsmarks per day. Both his brothers were also leased to I.G. Farben. According to Princz, Alex starved to death and Arthur was beaten severely for bringing him food then was executed. An older brother Eugene living in Hungary at the time they were arrested was killed, and a married sister Elsa also living in Hungary was never heard from again.

Princz was sent on a death march to Dachau to work repairing bomb damage to an underground Messerschmitt airplane factory. He was among a group of prisoners on a transport train headed toward the Alps on April 29, 1945 that was intercepted by an American armored unit when it stopped in Poing, Germany. "USA" had been stitched onto his uniform to identify his nationality, due to this the American troops sent him to a U.S. Military hospital.

== Fight for Compensation ==
After the I.G. Farben trial at Nuremberg, I.G. Farben was broken up into the six original companies that existed prior to their merger. Three of the larger companies were BASF, Hoechst AG and Bayer. They were ordered to pay reparations prior to resuming business in the United States.

The three companies set up a compensation fund which was combined with the one set up by West Germany's government. An office was established in New York City to handle claims and payments.

Hugo Princz first applied for compensation in 1955 for his. His claim was rejected that November Germany claimed that he was "An American citizen at the time of your persecution and the further reason that on Jan. 1, 1947, you were not a resident within the territory of the German Reich, you are not entitled to a claim for compensation". Germany's defense against non-payment was sovereign immunity.

== The Trial ==
Peter Heidenberger, represented Germany in the court case in Washington, D.C. stated to the press that:

"The German government very much regrets what happened to Mr. Princz . . . and after the war passed various laws compensating individuals like Mr. Princz for the wrongs they suffered." ...the original law compensating Holocaust victims covered only refugees and not U.S. citizens,... and Princz missed a 1969 deadline for filing a claim under a 1965 law that did hold the possibility of some relief....

Princz alleges that his enslavement at the behest of I.G. Farben and Messerschmitt was a commercial enterprise exempt under the 1976 Foreign Sovereign Immunity Act.

== Congressional Support ==
In 1984, Sen. Bill Bradley (D-N.J.) acted on Pincz's behalf and had the State Department press his claim. Officials from the German Embassy in Washington acted on his behalf as well. In 1987 the West German Foreign Ministry in Bonn would still not approve payment.

In October, 1990 after the merger of East and West Germany, senator, Jesse Helms (R-N.C.) acted on his behalf to try apply diplomatic pressure on Germany.

"To them, this has become a matter of national honor," Princz's lawyer, Perles, says of the German government. "When I first took the case in 1986, I expected to be done with it in 90 days. They admit this happened, they say they're sorry for it, but they're not going to pay."

In July 1994, the United States Court of Appeals for the District of Columbia Circuit reversed the ruling. The Supreme Court upheld the appeals court. The, in 1995, Prince sued the German companies for whom he was forced to work while he was a prisoner at Auschwitz. In 1995, after President Bill Clinton personally raised Mr. Princz's case with German Chancellor Helmut Kohl, Germany agreed to pay reparations. He eventually won part of a 2.1 million dollar settlement, shared with 11 others, after legal expenses, reached in part due to a settlement between the U.S. Justice Department and Germany.
