= Rachel Greszler =

American economist and policy analyst

Rachel Greszler is an American economist and policy analyst.

== Education ==
Greszler has a bachelor's degree in economics from the University of Mary Washington. She also holds master's degrees in both economics and public policy from Georgetown University.

== Career ==
Greszler was a senior economist on the staff of the Joint Economic Committee of the United States Congress for seven years. She then joined the Heritage Foundation in 2013 as a research fellow in economics, budget, and entitlements.
