= Schedule C appointment =

Appointment type in the United States

A Schedule C appointment is a type of political appointment in the United States for confidential or policy roles immediately subordinate to other appointees. As of 2026, there were 1,835 Schedule C appointees. Most of these are confidential assistants, policy experts, special counsels, and schedulers, although about 500 of them are non-policy support roles. Schedule C appointments were created in 1956 and are part of the excepted service.

== Characteristics ==
Schedule C appointments are considered to be the lowest level of political appointments. George H. W. Bush strategist Lee Atwater was said to have believed strongly in rewarding young campaign staffers with Schedule C positions.

The immediate supervisor of a Schedule C position must be a presidential appointee, member of the Senior Executive Service, or another Schedule C appointee. Schedule C positions generally, but not always, are on the top end of the General Schedule pay scale at the GS-12 through GS-15 levels. Schedule C appointments tend to be made within each agency and then approved by the Office of Presidential Personnel.

Schedule C is the third of five excepted service hiring authorities provided by the Office of Personnel Management (OPM) to fill jobs in unusual or special circumstances, when it is not feasible or practical to use traditional competitive hiring procedures. Each Schedule C position requires case-by-case permission from OPM, which expires when their supervisor leaves.

== Restrictions ==
Schedule C and other appointees sometimes attempt to transfer to a career position in the competitive service, excepted service, or Senior Executive Service; this practice, known as "burrowing in", is desired by employees due to increased pay and job security, as career positions do not end when a presidential administration changes. As these appointed positions are selected non-competitively, while career employees are supposed to be selected on the basis of merit and without political influence, these conversions are subject to extra scrutiny. In July 2008, members of Congress criticized the Department of Homeland Security and Department of Justice for improperly allowing political employees to convert to career positions. Since 2010, such conversions require advance approval from OPM, and the Government Accountability Office (GAO) periodically audits the conversions.

OPM must also approve Schedule C appointees being detailed to competitive service positions. In 1992, GAO criticized the practice of hiring Schedule C employees and then immediately detailing them to positions in the Executive Office of the President, and this practice was later banned.
