= Office of Navajo and Hopi Indian Relocation =

US government independent agency

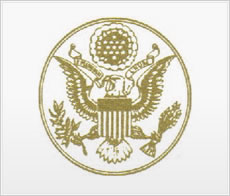
- Seal

Agency overview
- Formed: December 22, 1974; 51 years ago
- Headquarters: 201 E. Birch Ave Suite 11; Flagstaff, AZ 86001
- Employees: 18
- Annual budget: $4 million
- Website: www.onhir.gov

The Office of Navajo and Hopi Indian Relocation (ONHIR) was an independent agency of the executive branch of the U.S. Government. It was responsible for assisting Hopi and Navajo Indians impacted by the relocation that Congress mandated in the Navajo-Hopi Land Settlement Act of 1974 for the members of the Hopi and Navajo tribes who were living on each other's land. ONHIR was permanently closed September 30, 2025.
