= Office of Electricity =

US Department of Energy program office

The Office of Electricity (OE) is a program office within the United States Department of Energy. The mission of OE is to work "closely with [...] private and public partners" and "lead the Department’s efforts to ensure that the Nation’s most critical energy infrastructure is secure and resilient." It does this through research and development of new technologies and overseeing the Federal and state electricity policies and programs for planning and market operations.

== Responsibilities ==
Per the Delegation Order S1-DEL-S4-2023 the Office is responsible for:

- study of codes and standards for the use of energy storage systems across sectors per section 40111 of the Infrastructure Investment and Jobs Act;
- under the Energy Independence and Security Act execution of activities to carry out research, development, and demonstration of:
  - electric grid modeling, sensing, visualization, architecture development, and advanced operation and controls, including commercial application;
  - development of cost-effective integrated energy systems, including a strategic plan;
  - in coordination with the Grid Deployment Office:
    - electric vehicle integration into the electric grid;
    - smart grid technology;
- solicitation of advice from an existing advisory committee on the authorization of research, development, and demonstration projects;
- under the Energy Policy Act of 2005 execution of activities to:
  - carry out an Advanced Power System Technology Incentive Program to support the deployment of advanced power system technologies and improve and protect certain critical governmental, industrial, and commercial processes;
  - in coordination with the Grid Deployment Office carry out research, development, and demonstration of grid integration;
  - conduct a study and submit an annual report on the benefits of economic dispatch;
  - carry out programs of research, development, demonstration, and commercial application on distributed energy resources and systems reliability and efficiency;
- under the Energy Act of 2020:
  - carry out a grant program for eligible projects related to the modernization of the electric grid;
  - develop voluntary model pathways for modernizing the electric grid, establish a steering committee to help develop those pathways, and provide technical assistance.
  - submit a report on performance metrics for electricity infrastructure providers;
  - provide assistance to States, regional organizations, and electric utilities for the development electricity distribution plans;
  - carry out a micro-grid and integrated micro-grid systems program in coordination with the Grid Deployment Office.
  - submit a report on electricity access and reliability.
- enter and perform contracts with public agencies and private organizations and persons as delegated to the Assistant Secretary for Electricity;
- collect, assemble, evaluate, and analyze energy information;
- participate in proceedings before the Federal Energy Regulatory Commission or any Federal or State agency or commission related to authority delegated to the Under Secretary for Science (and Innovation).

=== Historical ===
The Office used to be responsible for leading efforts to modernize the electric grid. When the Grid Deployment Office (GDO) was established in 2022, these responsibilities were transferred there. The Office of Electricity also worked with the Department of Homeland Security and other agencies to enhance the security of the nation's critical energy infrastructure, this task was transferred to the Office of Cybersecurity, Energy Security, and Emergency Response (CESER) when the latter was established in 2018.

== Organization ==
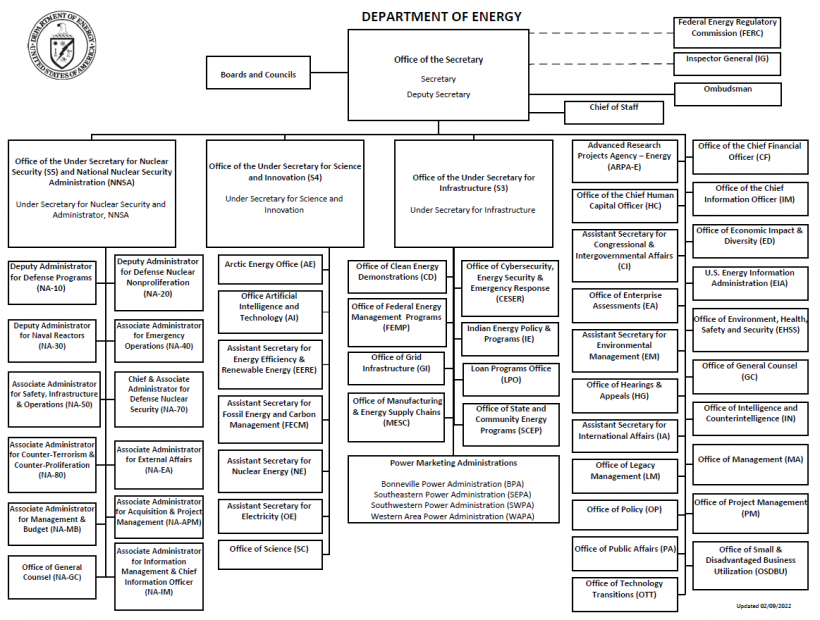
Organizational chart of the US Department of Energy after the February 2022 reorganization

The Office is under the general supervision of the Under Secretary of Energy for Science and Innovation. The Office is administered by the Assistant Secretary for Electricity (ASE), who is appointed by the President of the United States. The Assistant Secretary for Electricity Delivery and Energy Reliability is appointed by the President with the advice and consent of the Senate. The Assistant Secretary is paid at level IV of the Executive Schedule. The Assistant Secretary is assisted in running the Office by Deputy Assistant Secretaries, who can be career employees or political appointees. Each of the Deputy Assistant Secretaries oversee a different branch of the Office's work.

Effective October 21, 2022, the Office of Electricity has the following reporting relationships:

- Assistant Secretary
  - Chief of Staff
  - Chief Operating Officer, Corporate Business Operations
    - Director, Budget
    - Director, Communications
    - Director, Procurement, Strategic Planning and Operations
    - Director, Workforce Development
  - Principal Deputy Assistant Secretary
    - Deputy Assistant Secretary for Grid Systems and Components
      - Director, Grid Systems
      - Director, Grid Components
      - Director, Applied Grid Transformation
    - Deputy Assistant Secretary for Grid Controls and Communications
      - Director, Grid Monitoring
      - Director, Grid Controls
      - Director, Grid Cybersecurity and Communications
    - Deputy Assistant Secretary for Energy Storage
      - Director, Storage Analysis
      - Director, Storage Validation
      - Director, Storage Materials and Systems

== Sources ==
- Sissine, Fred (February 9, 2016). "DOE's Office of Electricity Delivery and Energy Reliability (OE): A Primer, with Appropriations for FY2016". unt.edu. Congressional Research Service.
- DOE (April 10, 2023). "S1-DEL-S4-2023-2, Delegation of Authority to the Under Secretary for Science (and Innovation)". doe.gov. Department of Energy.
