= Presidency of Chester A. Arthur =

1881–1885 U.S. presidential administration

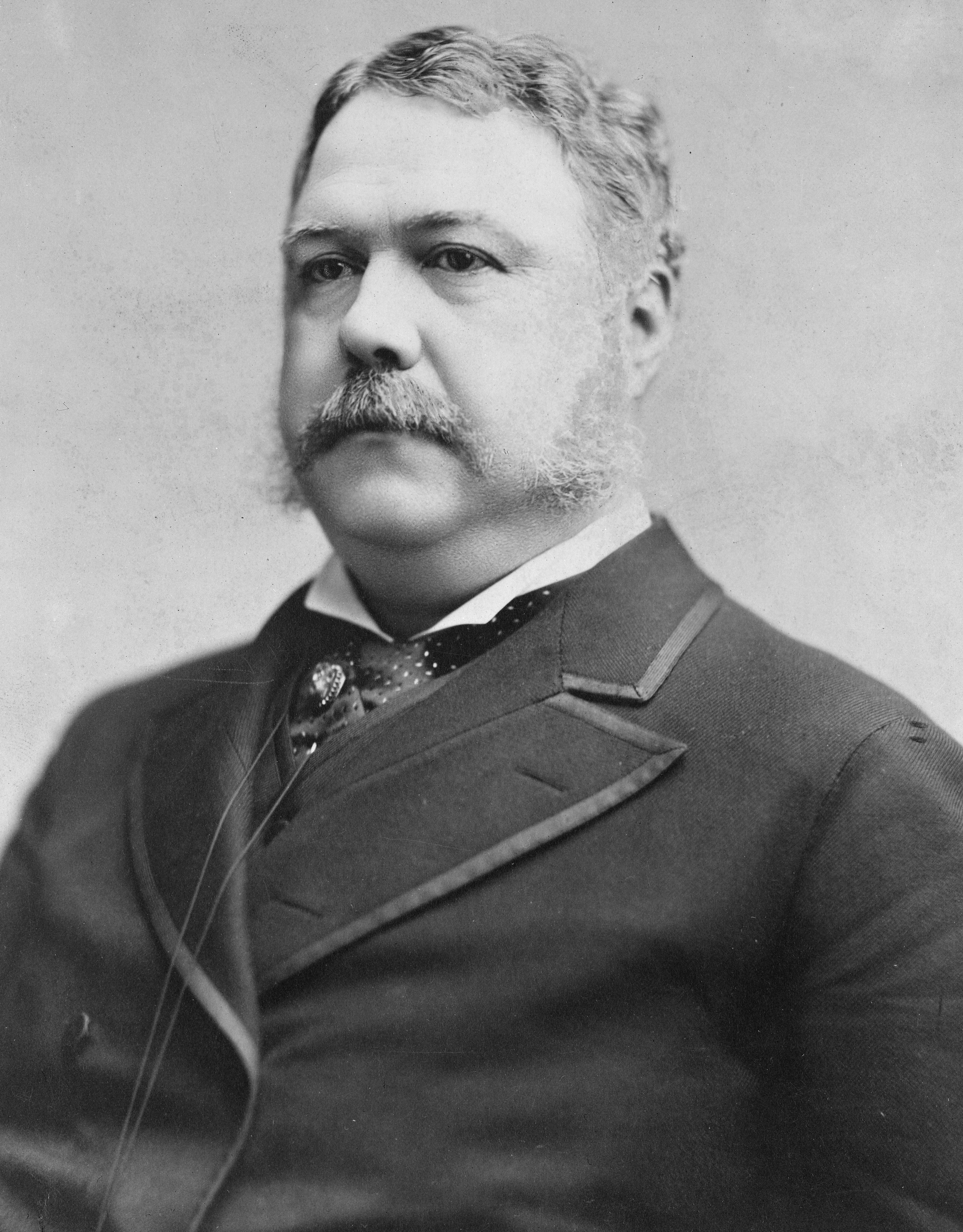
- Presidency of Chester A. Arthur; September 19, 1881 – March 4, 1885
- Vice President: None (Note: Arthur was Vice President under James A. Garfield and became President upon Garfield's death on September 19, 1881. This was prior to the adoption of the Twenty-fifth Amendment in 1967, and a vacancy in the office of vice president was not filled until the next ensuing election and inauguration.)
- Cabinet: See list
- Party: Republican
- Election: None
- Seat: White House
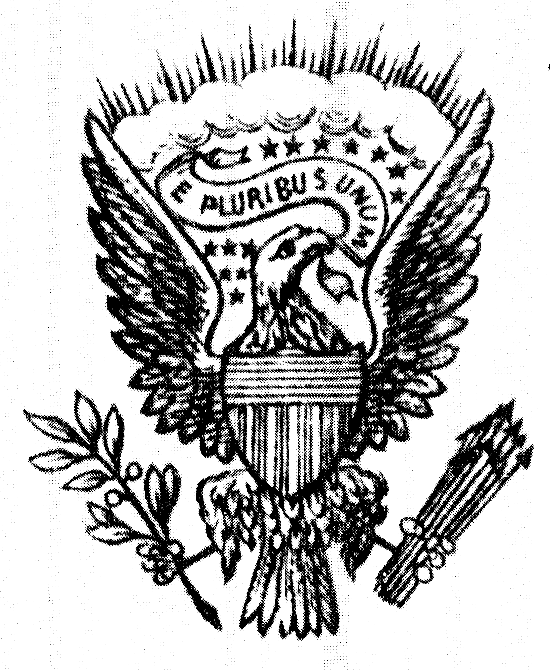
- Presidential coat of arms (1877–1913)

Chester A. Arthur's tenure as the 21st president of the United States began on September 19, 1881, when he succeeded to the presidency upon the assassination of President James A. Garfield, and ended on March 4, 1885. Arthur, a Republican, had been vice president for 199 days when he succeeded to the presidency. In ill health and lacking the full support of his party by the end of his term, Arthur made only a token effort for the Republican presidential nomination in the 1884 presidential election. He was succeeded by Democrat Grover Cleveland.

Supporters of a third term for Ulysses S. Grant at the 1880 Republican National Convention chose Arthur as the running mate of dark horse nominee James Garfield in the 1880 United States presidential election due to Arthur's association with the Republican Party's Stalwart faction, and Arthur struggled to overcome his reputation as a New York City machine politician. Surprising many, he embraced the cause of U.S. Civil Service Reform, and his advocacy and enforcement of the Pendleton Civil Service Reform Act became the centerpiece of his administration. Though patronage remained a powerful force in politics, the Pendleton Act laid the foundations for a professional civil service that would emerge in subsequent decades. Facing a budget surplus, Arthur signed the Tariff of 1883, which reduced tariffs. He also vetoed the Rivers and Harbors Act, an act that would have appropriated federal funds in a manner he thought excessive, and oversaw a building program for the United States Navy. After the Supreme Court struck down the Civil Rights Act of 1875, Arthur favored new civil rights legislation to protect African-Americans, but was unable to win passage of a new bill. In foreign policy, Arthur pursued closer economic and political relations with Latin America, but many of his proposed trade agreements were defeated in the United States Senate.

The 1884 Republican National Convention passed over Arthur in favor of James G. Blaine, but Cleveland defeated Blaine in the 1884 presidential election. Although Arthur's failing health and political temperament combined to make his administration less active than a modern presidency, he earned praise among contemporaries for his solid performance in office. Journalist Alexander McClure later wrote, "No man ever entered the presidency so profoundly and widely distrusted as Chester Alan Arthur, and no one ever retired ... more generally respected, alike by political friend and foe." Since his death, Arthur's reputation has mostly faded from the public consciousness. Although some have praised his flexibility and willingness to embrace reform, present-day historians and scholars generally rank him as a below-average president. Arthur, historically, has been given credit for initiating the resurgence of the U.S. Navy with all steel ships.

== Background ==
Chester A. Arthur was born in 1829 and raised a Baptist in Vermont by his abolitionist father. Arthur attended Union College, became a lawyer, and a Whig (later Republican) politician. As a young New York lawyer, Arthur participated in two important civil rights cases and advocated for African Americans. In 1861, during the Civil War, Arthur was promoted to Quartermaster General of New York. After the war Arthur became "Chief Lieutenant" to Republican Senator Roscoe Conkling . Arthur was rewarded with the New York Customs House Collector post in 1871. The lucrative job made Arthur a wealthy man and he was known to be a "gentleman boss." Arthur developed a fine taste for wines, fine food, cigars, fancy clothing, and free time devoted to leisure. However, in 1878, reform-minded President Hayes fired Arthur from the Collector post, to undermine the Conkling Stalwarts.

== Election of 1880 ==
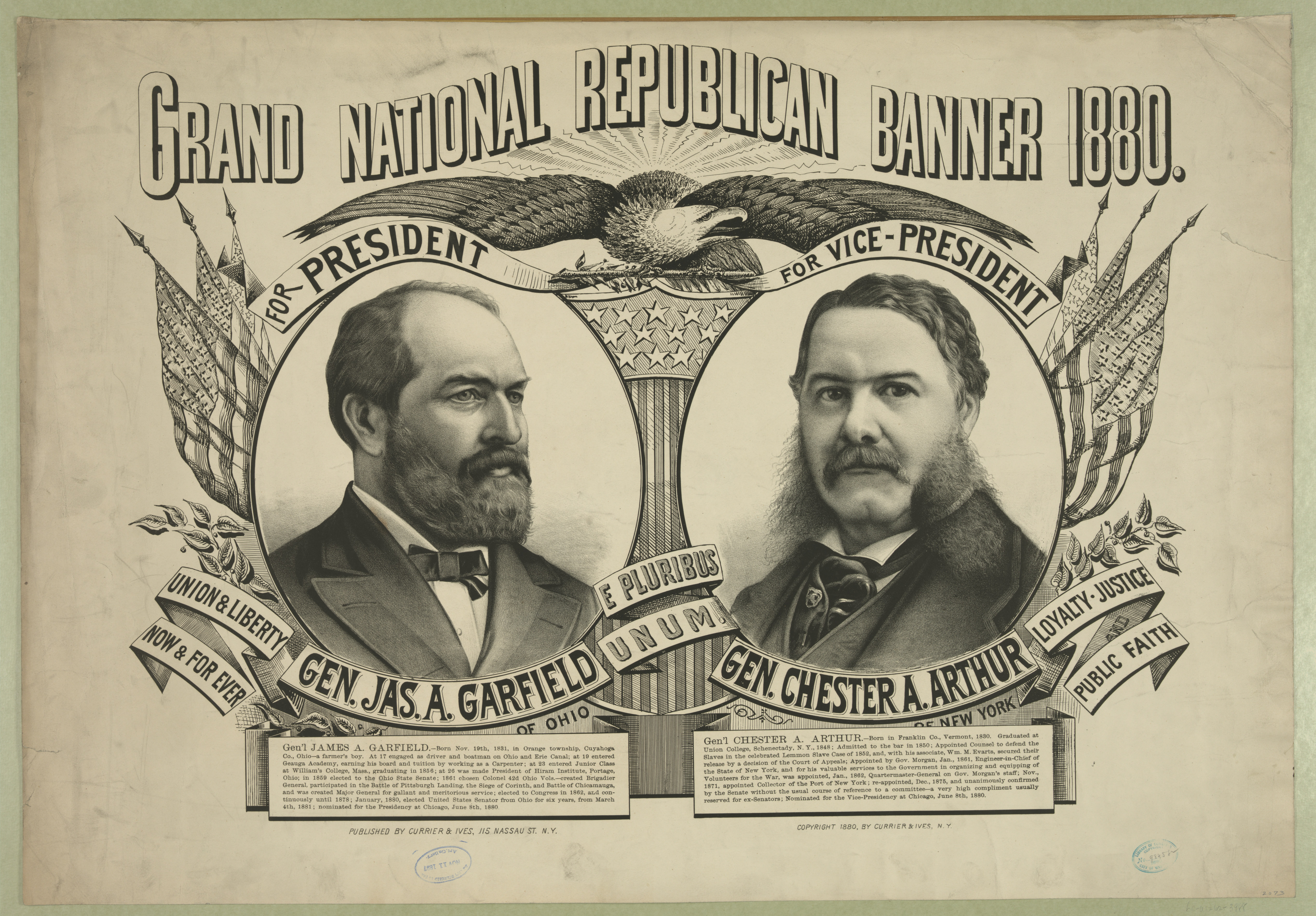
Garfield-Arthur 1880 Republican Presidential Ticket

After President Rutherford B. Hayes declined to seek re-election in 1880, several candidates vied for the presidential nomination at the 1880 Republican National Convention. The convention deadlocked between supporters of former President Ulysses S. Grant and Senator James G. Blaine, resulting in the nomination of a dark horse candidate, James A. Garfield. Garfield associated with the "Half-Breed" Republicans, who opposed Grant running for a third presidential term. Hoping to unite the Republican Party behind his candidacy, Garfield decided to select a follower of New York Senator Roscoe Conkling, a leader of the party's Stalwart faction, as his running mate. The Republicans quickly chose Arthur, a former Collector of the Port of New York who was closely allied with Conkling. The Garfield-Arthur ticket won the 1880 presidential election, but after taking office, Garfield clashed with Conkling over appointments and other issues. Arthur's continued loyalty to Conkling marginalized him within the Garfield administration and, after the Senate went into recess in May 1881, Arthur returned to his home state of New York.

== Accession to office ==
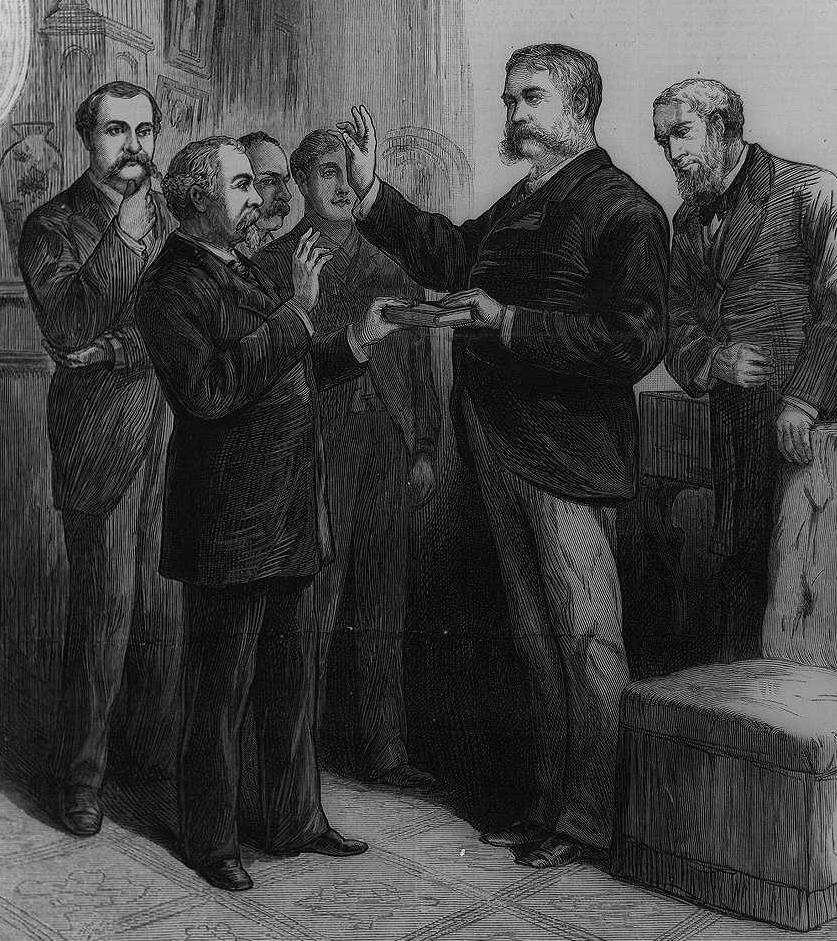
Arthur taking the oath of office as administered by Judge John R. Brady at Arthur's home in New York City, September 20, 1881

On July 2, 1881, Arthur learned that Garfield had been badly wounded in a shooting. The shooter, Charles J. Guiteau, was a deranged office-seeker who believed that Garfield's successor would appoint him to a patronage job. Though he had barely known Guiteau, Arthur had to allay suspicions that he had been behind the assassination. He was reluctant to be seen acting as president while Garfield lived, and in the months after the shooting, with Garfield near death and Arthur still in New York, there was a void of authority in the executive office. Many worried about the prospect of an Arthur presidency; the New York Times, which had supported Arthur earlier in his career, wrote: "Arthur is about the last man who would be considered eligible for the position." Garfield died on September 19, and Judge John R. Brady of the New York Supreme Court administered the oath of office to Arthur in the latter's New York City home at 2:15 a.m. on September 20. Before leaving New York, Arthur ensured the presidential line of succession by preparing and mailing to the White House a proclamation calling for a Senate special session, thus ensuring that the Senate could select a president pro tempore, who would be first in the presidential line of succession.

On September 22, Arthur re-took the oath of office, this time before Chief Justice Morrison R. Waite. He took this step to ensure procedural compliance; there were lingering questions about whether Brady, a state court judge, could administer a federal oath of office. (Note: One presidential oath had been administered by a state court judge, also in New York City by a New York State judge: Robert Livingston, Chancellor of New York, administered the first presidential oath to George Washington at Federal Hall in 1789. The presidential oath would later be administered by John Calvin Coolidge Sr., a notary public, at the 1923 swearing in of Calvin Coolidge. Coolidge later re-took the oath before a federal judge.) Arthur ordered a remodeling of the White House and took up residence at the home of Senator John P. Jones until December 1881, when he moved into the White House. As Arthur was a widower, his sister, Mary Arthur McElroy, served as the de facto First Lady of the United States. Arthur took office over a growing country (population had increased from 30 million in 1860 to 50 million in 1880) that maintained a budget surplus and peaceful relations with the great powers of the day.

There was controversy over Arthur's birthplace and whether he had a right to be on the Republican presidential ticket. New York attorney, Arthur P. Hinman, accused Arthur of being born a British subject. Hinman claimed Arthur was born in Canada to a British father and an American mother. However, the New York Sun published an article on the day after Arthur took the oath of office, that proved Hinman's claim a hoax, reassuring the public of Arthurs's origins. The controversy stemmed from Article Two, Section One of the United States Constitution that says “No person except a natural born citizen of the United States, at the time of the adoption of this Constitution, shall be eligible to the Office of President...”

== Administration ==
Arthur cabinet
Office	Name	Term
President	Chester A. Arthur	1881–1885
Vice President	none	1881–1885
Secretary of State	James G. Blaine	1881
Frederick T. Frelinghuysen	1881–1885
Secretary of the Treasury	William Windom	1881
Charles J. Folger	1881–1884
Walter Q. Gresham	1884
Hugh McCulloch	1884–1885
Secretary of War	Robert Todd Lincoln	1881–1885
Attorney General	Wayne MacVeagh	1881
Benjamin H. Brewster	1881–1885
Postmaster General	Thomas Lemuel James	1881
Timothy O. Howe	1881–1883
Walter Q. Gresham	1883–1884
Frank Hatton	1884–1885
Secretary of the Navy	William H. Hunt	1881–1882
William E. Chandler	1882–1885
Secretary of the Interior	Samuel J. Kirkwood	1881–1882
Henry M. Teller	1882–1885

Arthur quickly came into conflict with Garfield's cabinet, most of whom represented opposing factions within the party. At the same time, he distanced himself from Conkling, and he sought to appoint officials who were well-regarded by both reformers and party loyalists. Arthur asked Garfield's cabinet members to remain until December 1881, when Congress would reconvene, but Treasury Secretary William Windom submitted his resignation in October to enter a Senate race in his home state of Minnesota. Arthur then selected Charles J. Folger, his friend and a fellow New York Stalwart, as Windom's replacement. (Note: Arthur first offered the post to Edwin D. Morgan, who had been his patron in New York; Morgan was confirmed by the Senate, but declined on the grounds of age.) Attorney General Wayne MacVeagh was next to resign, believing that, as a reformer, he had no place in an Arthur cabinet. Arthur replaced MacVeagh with Benjamin H. Brewster, a Philadelphia lawyer and machine politician reputed to have reformist leanings. Secretary of State Blaine, one of the key leaders of the Half-Breed faction of the Republican Party, also resigned in December.

Conkling expected Arthur to appoint him in Blaine's place, as he had been Arthur's patron for much of the latter's career. But the president chose Frederick T. Frelinghuysen of New Jersey, a Stalwart recommended by former President Grant. Though Frelinghuysen advised Arthur not to fill any future vacancies with Stalwarts, Arthur selected Timothy O. Howe, a Wisconsin Stalwart, to replace Postmaster General Thomas Lemuel James after the latter resigned in January 1882. Navy Secretary William H. Hunt was next to resign, in April 1882, and Arthur attempted to placate the Half-Breeds by appointing William E. Chandler, who had been recommended by Blaine. Finally, when Interior Secretary Samuel J. Kirkwood resigned that same month, Arthur appointed Henry M. Teller, a Colorado Stalwart, to the office. Of the cabinet members Arthur had inherited from Garfield, only Secretary of War Robert Todd Lincoln remained for the entirety of Arthur's term.

== Judicial appointments ==
Arthur made appointments to fill two vacancies on the United States Supreme Court. The first vacancy arose in July 1881 with the death of Associate Justice Nathan Clifford, a Democrat who had been a member of the Court since before the American Civil War. Arthur nominated Horace Gray, a distinguished jurist from the Massachusetts Supreme Judicial Court, to replace Clifford, and the nomination was easily confirmed. Gray would remain on the Court until 1902. A second vacancy occurred when Associate Justice Ward Hunt retired in January 1882. Arthur first nominated his old political boss, Roscoe Conkling; he doubted that Conkling would accept, but felt obligated to offer a high office to his former patron. The Senate confirmed the nomination but, as expected, Conkling declined it, the last time a confirmed nominee declined an appointment. Senator George Edmunds was Arthur's next choice, but he declined to be considered. Instead, Arthur nominated Samuel Blatchford, who had been a judge on the Second Circuit Court of Appeals for the prior four years. Blatchford accepted, and his nomination was approved by the Senate within two weeks. Blatchford served on the Court until his death in 1893.

In addition to his two Supreme Court appointments, Arthur also appointed four circuit court judges and fourteen district court judges.

== Civil service reform ==
=== Pendleton Act ===
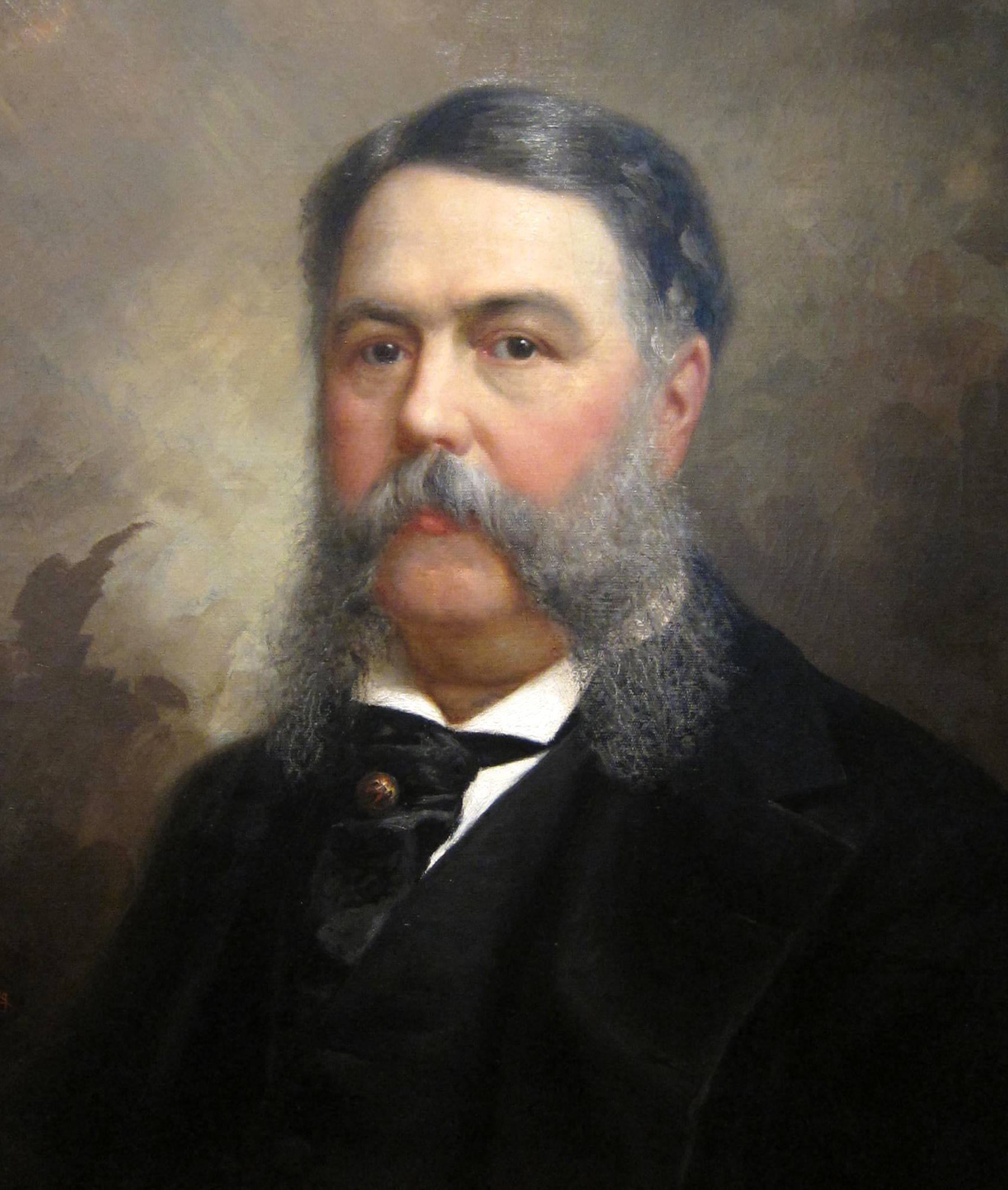
Ole Peter Hansen Balling's 1881 portrait of Chester A. Arthur

In the early 1880s, American politics operated on the spoils system, a political patronage practice in which victorious candidates rewarded their loyal supporters, family, and friends by installing them in government civil service positions. Movements calling for Civil Service Reform arose in the wake of the corruption in the Grant Administration. In 1880, Democratic Senator George H. Pendleton of Ohio had introduced legislation to require the selection of civil servants based on merit as determined by an examination. The measure failed to pass, but Garfield's assassination by a deranged office seeker amplified the public demand for reform. Late in 1881, in his first annual address to Congress, Arthur requested civil service reform legislation, and Pendleton again introduced his bill, which again did not pass.

Then, in the 1882 congressional elections, Republicans suffered a crushing defeat. The party lost its majority control in the House of Representatives, as Democrats, campaigning on the reform issue, defeated 40 Republican incumbents and picked up a total of 70 seats. This defeat helped convince many Republicans to support the reform proposal during the 1882 lame-duck session of Congress; the Senate approved the bill 38–5 and the House soon concurred by a vote of 155–47. Arthur signed the Pendleton Civil Service Reform Act into law on January 16, 1883. The bill created a civil service commission to oversee civil service examinations and outlawed the use of "assessments," fees that political appointees were expected to pay to their respective political parties as the price for their appointments. These reforms had previously been proposed by the Jay Commission, which had investigated Arthur during his time as Collector of the Port of New York. In just two years' time, an unrepentant Stalwart had become the president who ushered in long-awaited civil service reform.

Even after Arthur signed the Pendleton Civil Service Reform Act into law, proponents of the act doubted Arthur's commitment to reform. The act initially applied only to ten percent of federal jobs and, without proper implementation by the president, would not have affected the remaining civil service positions. To the surprise of his critics, Arthur acted quickly to appoint the members of the newly created Civil Service Commission, naming reformers Dorman Bridgman Eaton, John Milton Gregory, and Leroy D. Thoman as commissioners. The chief examiner, Silas W. Burt, was a long-time reformer who had been Arthur's opponent when the two men worked at the New York Customs House. The commission issued its first rules in May 1883; by 1884, half of all postal officials and three-quarters of the Customs Service jobs were to be awarded by merit. Arthur expressed satisfaction with the new system, praising its effectiveness "in securing competent and faithful public servants and in protecting the appointing officers of the Government from the pressure of personal importunity and from the labor of examining the claims and pretensions of rival candidates for public employment." Although state patronage systems and numerous federal positions were unaffected by the law, Karabell argues that the Pendleton Act was instrumental in the creation of a professional civil service and the rise of the modern bureaucratic state. The law also caused major changes in campaign finance, as the parties were forced to look for new sources of campaign funds, such as wealthy donors.

=== Star Route scandal ===
In the late and early 1870s, the public had learned of the star route scandal, in which contractors for star postal routes were greatly overpaid for their services with the connivance of government officials, including former Senator Stephen Wallace Dorsey. Although Arthur had worked closely with Dorsey before his presidency, once in office he supported the investigation and forced the resignation of officials suspected in the scandal. An 1882 trial of the ringleaders resulted in convictions for two minor conspirators and a hung jury for the rest. After a juror came forward with allegations that the defendants attempted to bribe him, the judge set aside the guilty verdicts and granted a new trial. Before the second trial began, Arthur removed five federal office holders who were sympathetic with the defense, including a former senator. The second trial began in December 1882 and lasted until July 1883 and, again, did not result in a guilty verdict. Failure to obtain a conviction tarnished the administration's image, but Arthur did succeed in putting a stop to the fraud.

== Surplus and the tariff ==
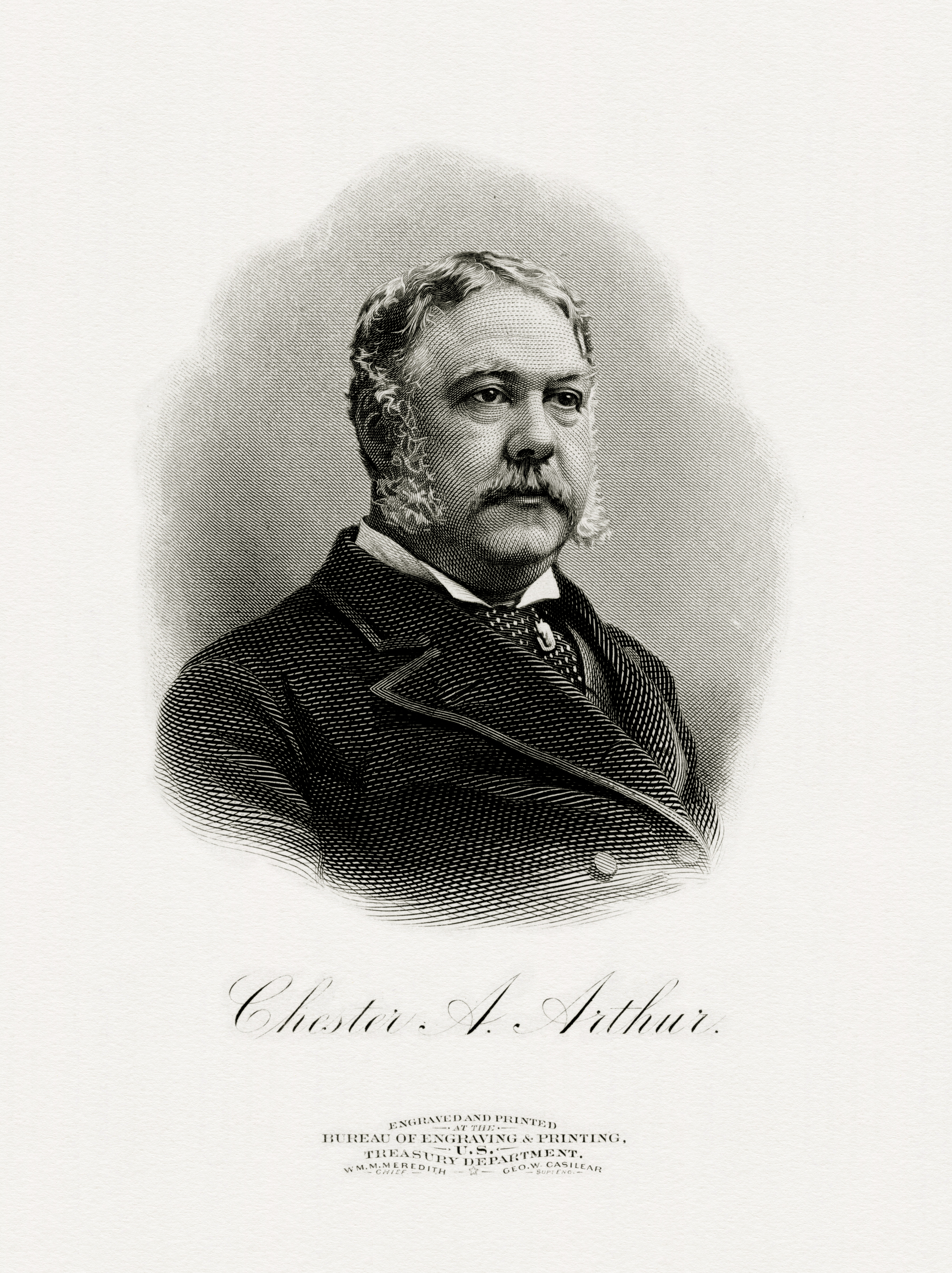
BEP engraved portrait of Arthur as president

With high revenue held over from wartime taxes, the federal government had collected more than it spent since 1866; by 1882 the surplus reached $145 million. Opinions varied on how to reduce the budget surplus; the Democrats favored reducing the surplus by lowering tariffs, which would, in turn, reduce the cost of imported goods. Republicans believed that high tariffs ensured high wages in manufacturing and mining, and they preferred reducing the surplus through spending more on internal improvements and cutting excise taxes. The debate over the tariff was complicated by the fact that each interest preferred higher tariffs for their particular field; many Southerners, for example, preferred low tariffs in general but favored higher tariffs for cotton, a major crop in the South. These competing interests led to the development of a complicated tariff system that levied different rates on different imports.

Arthur agreed with his party, and in 1882 called for the abolition of excise taxes on everything except liquor, as well as a simplification of the complex tariff structure. In May 1882, Representative William D. Kelley of Pennsylvania introduced a bill to establish a tariff commission. Arthur signed the bill into law and appointed mostly protectionists to the committee. Republicans were pleased with the committee's make-up but were surprised when, in December 1882, the committee submitted a report to Congress calling for tariff cuts averaging between 20 percent and 25 percent. The commission's recommendations were ignored, however, as the House Ways and Means Committee, dominated by protectionists, passed a bill providing for a 10 percent reduction in tariff rates. After a conference with the Senate, the bill that emerged only reduced tariffs by an average of 1.47 percent. The bill passed both houses narrowly on March 3, 1883, the last full day of the 47th Congress. Arthur signed the measure into law, and it had no effect on the budget surplus.

Congress attempted to balance the budget from the other side of the ledger, with increased spending on the 1882 Rivers and Harbors Act in the unprecedented amount of $19 million. While Arthur was not opposed to internal improvements, the scale of the bill disturbed him, as did what he saw as its narrow focus on "particular localities" rather than projects that benefited a larger part of the nation. On August 1, 1882, Arthur vetoed the bill to widespread popular acclaim; in his veto message, his principal objection was that it appropriated funds for purposes "not for the common defense or general welfare, and which do not promote commerce among the States." Congress overrode his veto the next day and the new law reduced the surplus by $19 million. Republicans considered the law a success at the time, but later concluded that it contributed to their loss of seats in the elections of 1882.

== Foreign affairs and immigration ==
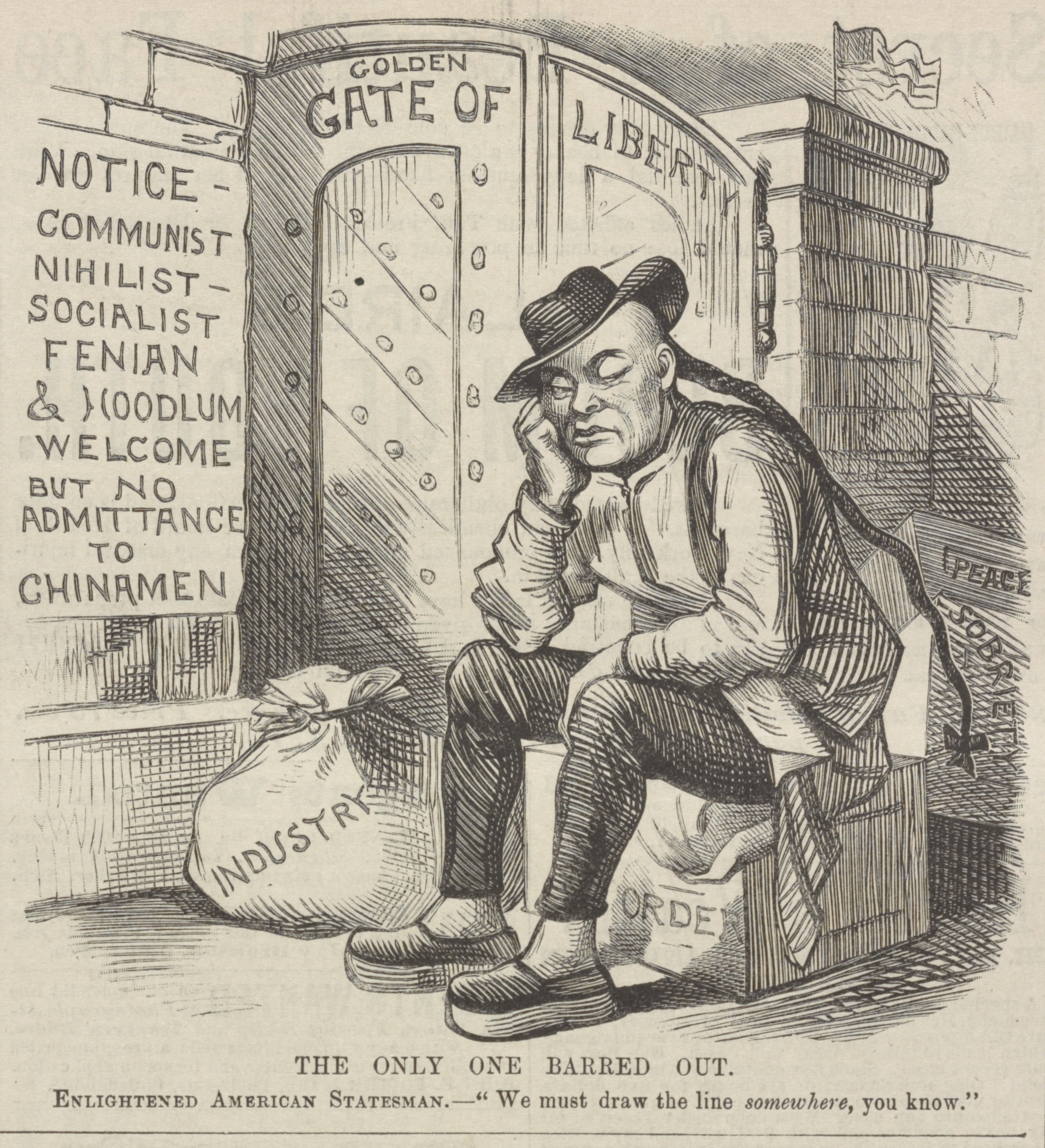
A political cartoon from 1882, criticizing Chinese exclusion

During his brief tenure in the Garfield and Arthur administrations, Secretary of State James G. Blaine attempted to invigorate United States diplomacy in Latin America, urging reciprocal trade agreements and offering to mediate disputes among the Latin American nations. Blaine hoped that increased U.S. involvement in the region would counter growing European (particularly British) influence in the Western Hemisphere. Blaine proposed a Pan-American conference in 1882 to discuss trade and an end to the War of the Pacific, but conference efforts lapsed after Blaine was replaced by Frelinghuysen in late 1881. On the other hand, Arthur and Frelinghuysen continued Blaine's efforts to encourage trade among the nations of the Western Hemisphere; a treaty with Mexico providing for reciprocal tariff reductions was signed in 1882 and approved by the Senate in 1884. Legislation required to bring the treaty into force failed in the House, however. Similar efforts at reciprocal trade treaties with Santo Domingo and Spain's American colonies were defeated by February 1885, and an existing reciprocity treaty with the Kingdom of Hawaii was allowed to lapse. The Frelinghuysen-Zavala Treaty, which would have allowed the United States to build a canal connecting the Atlantic and Pacific Oceans via Nicaragua, was also defeated in the Senate.

The 47th Congress spent a great deal of time on immigration. In July 1882, Congress easily passed a bill regulating steamships that carried immigrants to the United States. To their surprise, Arthur vetoed it and requested revisions, which they made and Arthur then approved. Arthur also signed the Immigration Act of 1882, which levied a 50-cent tax on immigrants to the United States, and excluded from entry the mentally ill, the intellectually disabled, criminals, or any other person potentially dependent upon public assistance.

Chinese immigration was a major political issue in the 1870s and 1880s, and it became a subject of debate in the 47th Congress. When Arthur took office, there were 250,000 Chinese immigrants in the United States, most of whom lived in California and worked as farmers or laborers. In January 1868, the Senate had ratified the Burlingame Treaty with China, allowing an unrestricted flow of Chinese into the country; when the economy soured after the Panic of 1873, many Americans blamed Chinese immigrants for depressing workmen's wages. In 1879, President Rutherford B. Hayes vetoed the Chinese Exclusion Act, which would have abrogated the Burlingame Treaty. Three years later, after China had agreed to treaty revisions, Congress tried again to exclude Chinese immigrants; Senator John F. Miller of California introduced another Chinese Exclusion Act that denied Chinese immigrants United States citizenship and banned their immigration for a twenty-year period. Miller's bill passed the Senate and House by overwhelming margins, but Arthur vetoed the bill, as he believed that the twenty-year ban breached the renegotiated treaty of 1880. That treaty allowed only a "reasonable" suspension of immigration. Eastern newspapers praised the veto, while it was condemned in the Western states. Congress was unable to override the veto, but passed a new bill reducing the immigration ban to ten years. Although he still objected to this denial of citizenship to Chinese immigrants, Arthur acceded to the compromise measure, signing the Chinese Exclusion Act into law on May 6, 1882. (Note: The portion of the law denying citizenship to Chinese-Americans was later found unconstitutional in United States v. Wong Kim Ark in 1898. Chinese immigration would be banned until the passage of the Magnuson Act in 1942.)

== Naval reform ==
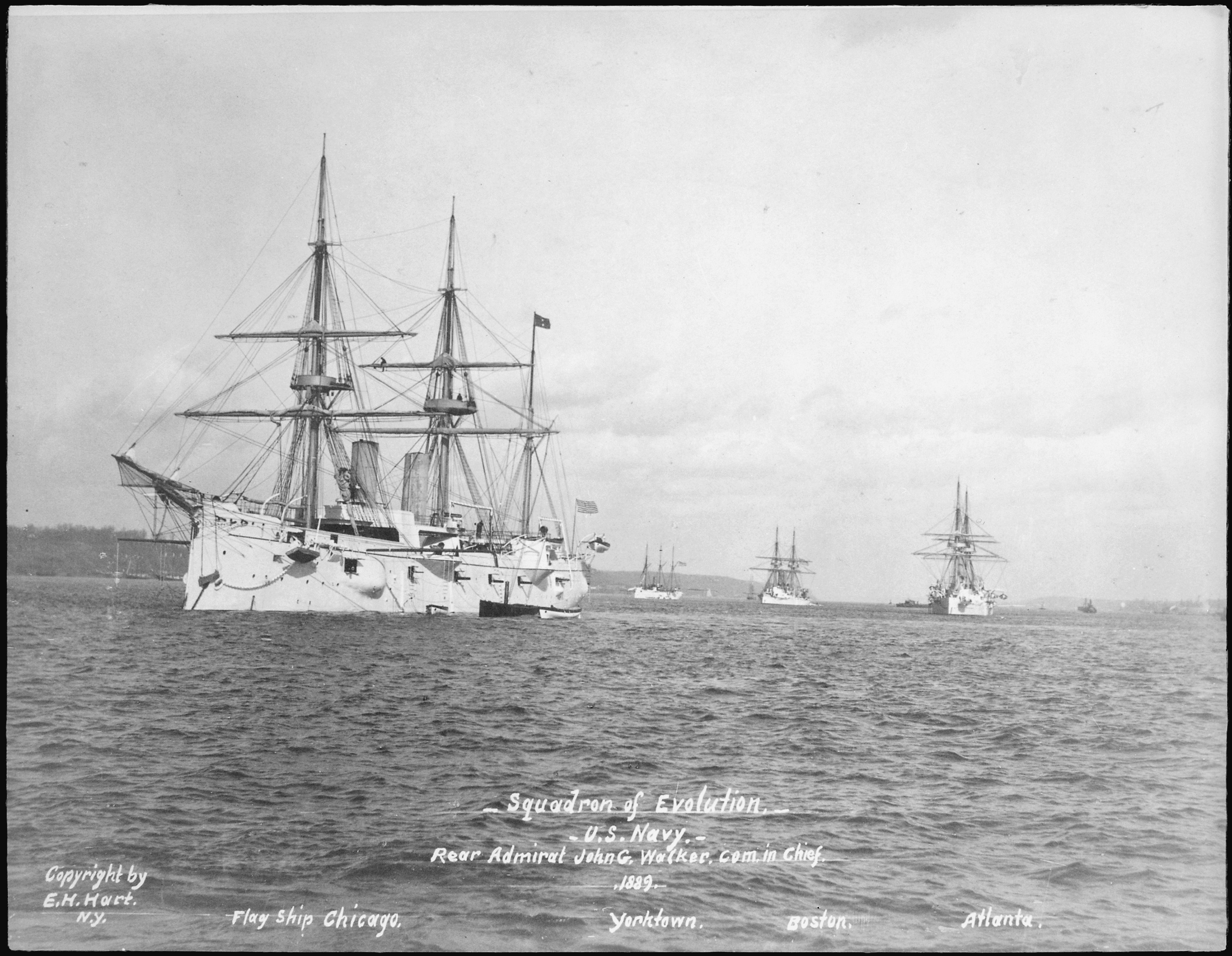
The "Squadron of Evolution" at anchor in 1889, after Yorktown had been added: Chicago, Yorktown, Boston, Atlanta

In the years following the Civil War, American naval power declined precipitously, shrinking from nearly 700 vessels to just 52, most of which were obsolete. The nation's military focus over the fifteen years before Garfield and Arthur's election had been on the Indian wars in the West, rather than the high seas, but as the region was increasingly pacified, many in Congress grew concerned at the poor state of the Navy. In his 1881 annual address to the nation, Arthur advocated a stronger navy. Garfield's Secretary of the Navy, William H. Hunt, had advocated reform of the Navy and his successor, William E. Chandler, appointed an advisory board to prepare a report on modernization. Based on the suggestions in the report, Congress appropriated funds, signed into law by Arthur, for the construction of three steel protected cruisers (Atlanta, Boston, and Chicago) and an armed steel dispatch-steamer (Dolphin), collectively known as the ABCD Ships or the Squadron of Evolution. Arthur gave full support to Chandler's strong administration of the U.S. Navy. Chandler purged the Navy's officer corps of those who supported antiquated wood-and-canvas ships and created the Naval War College. Additionally, Chandler, authorized by the law, scrapped old vessels whose repair costs exceeded their worth.

Congress also approved funds to rebuild four monitors (Puritan, Amphitrite, Monadnock, and Terror), which had lain uncompleted since 1877. Arthur strongly supported these efforts, believing that a strengthened navy would not only increase the country's security but also enhance U.S. prestige. The contracts to build the ABCD ships were all awarded to the low bidder, John Roach & Sons of Chester, Pennsylvania, even though Roach once employed Secretary Chandler as a lobbyist. Democrats turned against the "New Navy" projects and, when they won control of the 48th Congress, refused to appropriate funds for seven more steel warships. Even without the additional ships, the state of the Navy improved when, after several construction delays, the last of the new ships entered service in 1889.

=== Greely polar expedition rescue (1884) ===
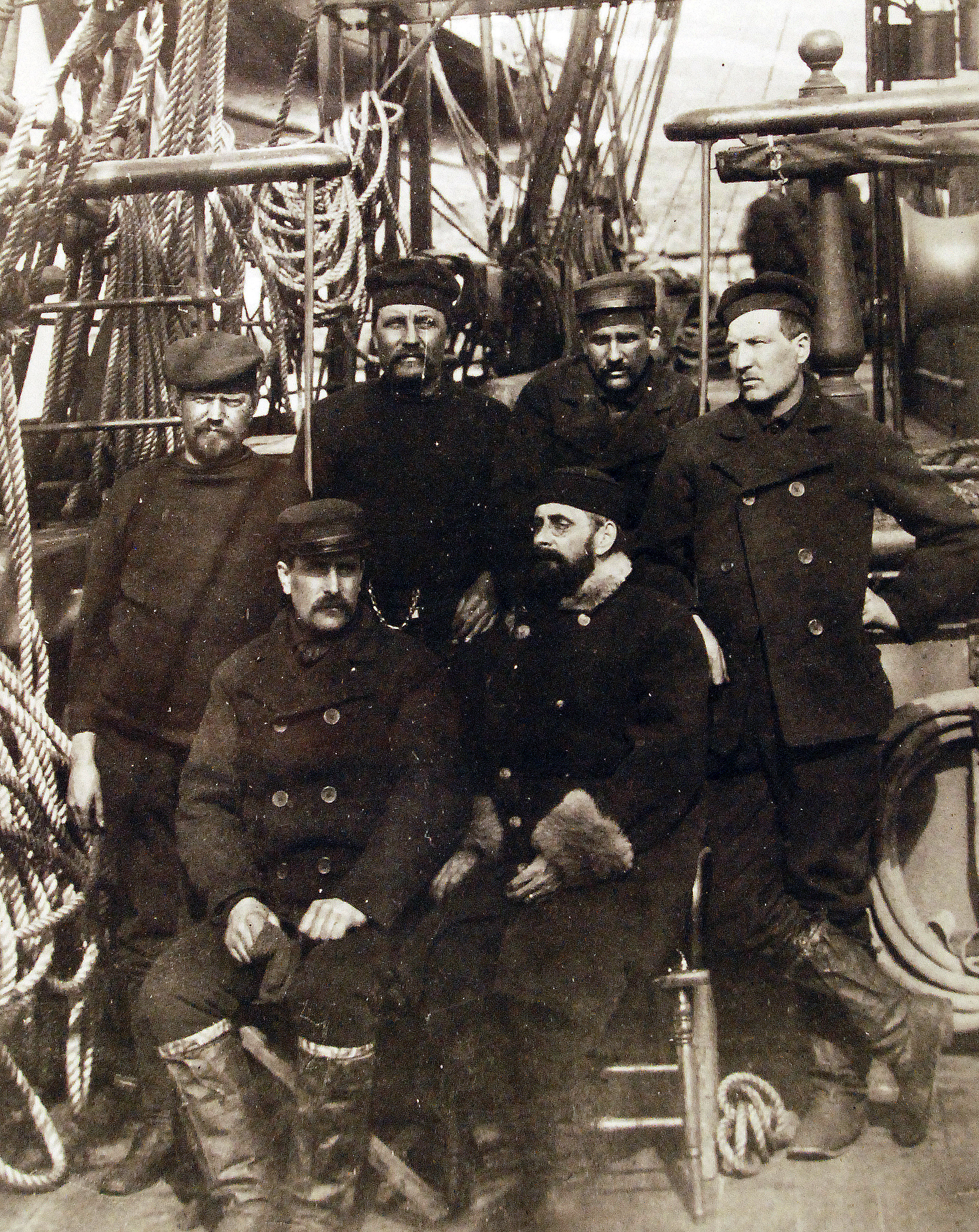
The six survivors of the Greely polar expedition.

The US Signal Corps Greely scientific polar expedition was stationed on Ellesmere Island in Northern Canada in 1881. Scheduled resupply ships were unable to reach the expedition in the summers of 1882 and 1883 due to sea ice, and the expedition was believed to be in a dire situation. On December 17, 1883, President Arthur established a joint Army–Navy commission to make recommendations to Secretary of War Lincoln and Secretary of Navy Chandler on how to rescue the Greely party. The commission's findings were approved by Congress on February 13, 1884. Lincoln actively cooperated with Chandler, who assigned Commander Winfield Schley to command the 1884 Greely Relief Mission. Chandler spared no expense in the rescue effort and had purchased one of the finest sealers afloat, the USS Bear, from Scottish owner Walter Grieve, for $100,000, prior to the passage of the Greely relief bill.

Chandler vigorously demanded that all of his subordinates in the Naval Department be committed to the relief of the Greely expedition. On July 17, 1884, after rescuing the Greely party, Schey arrived at Saint John's, Newfoundland colony, and telegraphed to Chandler that the rescue operation was successful. Of the seven rescued, Joseph Elison died on July 8 following multiple amputations. Evidence suggested that the men had survived through cannibalism.

=== Mentioned Greely expedition rescue ===
In his Fourth Annual Address to Congress, Arthur devoted two paragraphs to the rescue of the Greely expedition.

"In pursuance of the joint resolution of Congress approved February 13, 1884, a naval expedition was fitted out for the relief of Lieutenant A. W. Greely, United States Army, and of the party who had been engaged under his command in scientific observations at Lady Franklin Bay. The fleet consisted of the steam sealer Thetis, purchased in England; the Bear, purchased at St. John's, Newfoundland, and the Alert, which was generously provided by the British Government. Preparations for the expedition were promptly made by the Secretary of the Navy, with the active cooperation of the Secretary of War. Commander George W. Coffin was placed in command of the Alert and Lieutenant William H. Emory in command of the Bear. The Thetis was intrusted to Commander Winfield S. Schley, to whom also was assigned the superintendence of the entire expedition."

"Immediately upon its arrival at Upernavik the fleet began the dangerous navigation of Melville Bay, and in spite of every obstacle reached Littleton Island on June 22, a fortnight earlier than any vessel had before attained that point. On the same day it crossed over to Cape Sabine, where Lieutenant Greely and the other survivors of his party were discovered. After taking on board the living and the bodies of the dead, the relief ships sailed for St. John's, where they arrived on July 17. They were appropriately received at Portsmouth, N. H., on August 1 and at New York on August 8. One of the bodies was landed at the former place. The others were put on shore at Governors Island, and, with the exception of one, which was interred in the national cemetery, were forwarded thence to the destinations indicated by friends. The organization and conduct of this relief expedition reflects great credit upon all who contributed to its success."

== Civil rights and the South ==
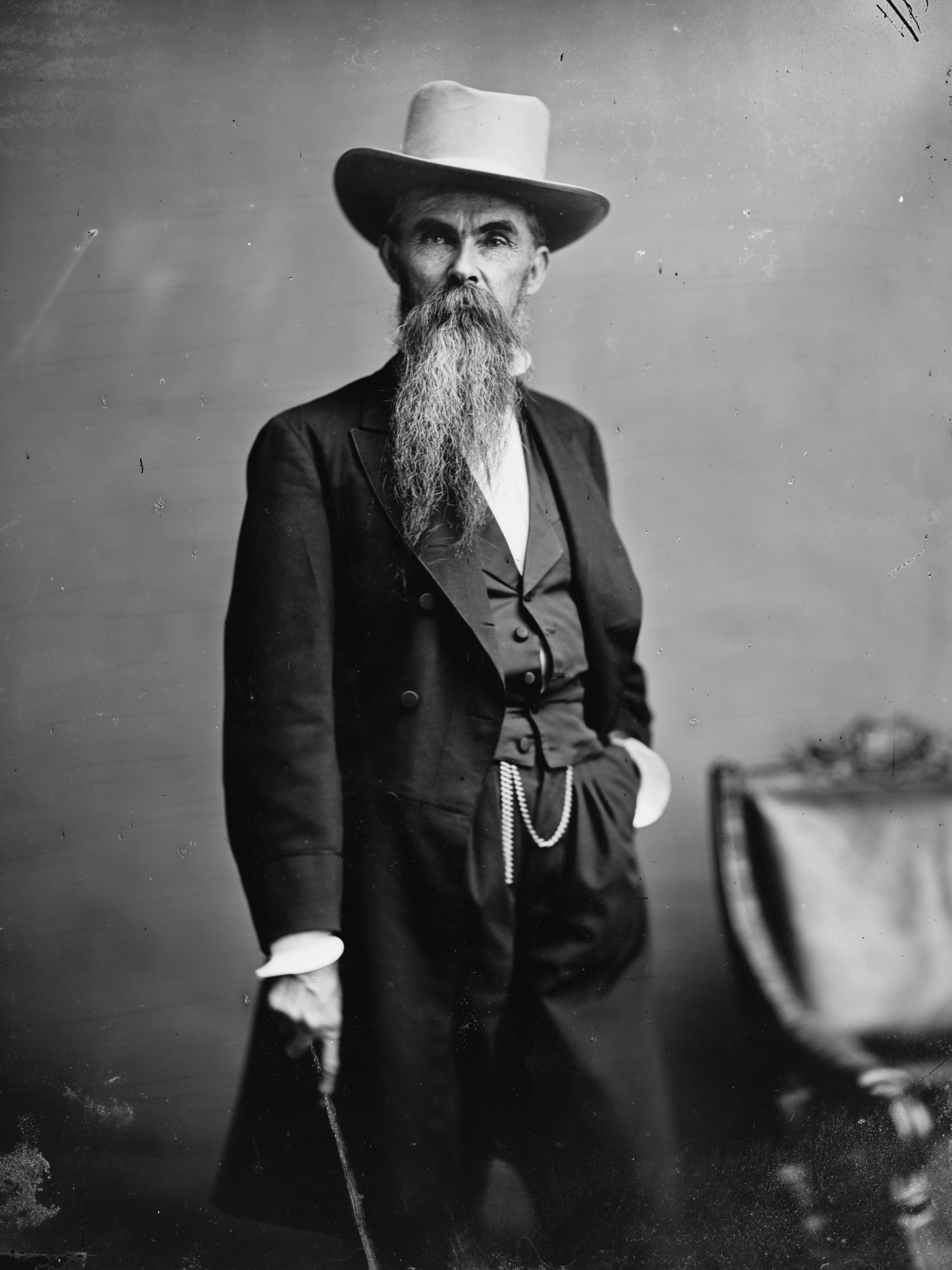
Readjuster Party leader William Mahone pressed civil rights in Virginia.

Like his Republican predecessors, Arthur struggled with the question of how his party was to challenge the Democrats in the South and how, if at all, to protect the civil rights of black Southerners. Since the end of Reconstruction, conservative white Democrats (or "Bourbon Democrats") had regained power in the South, and the Republican Party dwindled rapidly as their primary supporters in the region, blacks, were disenfranchised. One crack in the solidly Democratic South emerged with the growth of a new party, the Readjusters, in Virginia. Having won an election in that state on a platform of more education funding (for black and white schools alike) and the abolition of the poll tax and the whipping post, many northern Republicans saw the Readjusters as a more viable ally in the South than the moribund Southern Republican party. Arthur agreed, and directed the federal patronage in Virginia through the Readjusters rather than the Republicans. He followed the same pattern in other Southern states, forging coalitions with independents and Greenback Party members. Some black Republicans felt betrayed by the pragmatic gambit, but others (including Frederick Douglass and ex-Senator Blanche K. Bruce) endorsed the administration's actions, as the Southern independents had more liberal racial policies than the Democrats. Arthur's coalition policy was only successful in Virginia, however, and by 1885 the Readjuster movement had begun to collapse.

Other federal action on behalf of blacks was equally ineffective: when the Supreme Court struck down the Civil Rights Act of 1875 in the Civil Rights Cases (1883), Arthur expressed his disagreement with the decision in a message to Congress but was unable to persuade Congress to pass any new legislation in its place. The Civil Rights Act of 1875 had banned discrimination in public accommodations, and its overturning was an important component in the rise of the Jim Crow era of segregation and discrimination. Arthur did, however, effectively intervene to overturn a court-martial ruling against a black West Point cadet, Johnson Whittaker, after the Judge Advocate General of the Army, David G. Swaim, found the prosecution's case against Whittaker to be illegal and based on racism.

The administration faced a different challenge in the West, where the LDS Church was under government pressure to stop the practice of polygamy in Utah Territory. Garfield had believed polygamy was criminal behavior and was morally detrimental to family values, and Arthur's views were, for once, in line with his predecessor's. In 1882, he signed the Edmunds Act into law; the legislation made polygamy a federal crime, barring polygamists both from public office and the right to vote.

== Native American policy ==
The Arthur administration was challenged by changing relations with Western Native American tribes. With the American Indian Wars winding down, public sentiment was shifting toward more favorable treatment of Native Americans. Arthur urged Congress to increase funding for Native American education, which it did in 1884, although not to the extent he wished. He also favored a move to the allotment system, under which individual Native Americans, rather than tribes, would own land. Arthur was unable to convince Congress to adopt the idea during his administration but, in 1887, the Dawes Act changed the law to favor such a system. The allotment system was favored by liberal reformers at the time, but eventually proved detrimental to Native Americans as most of their land was resold at low prices to white speculators. During Arthur's presidency, settlers and cattle ranchers continued to encroach on Native American territory. Arthur initially resisted their efforts, but after Secretary of the Interior Teller, an opponent of allotment, assured him that the lands were not protected, Arthur opened up the Crow Creek Reservation in the Dakota Territory to settlers by executive order in 1885. Arthur's successor, Grover Cleveland, finding that title belonged to the Native Americans, revoked the order a few months later.

== Health, travel, and 1884 election ==
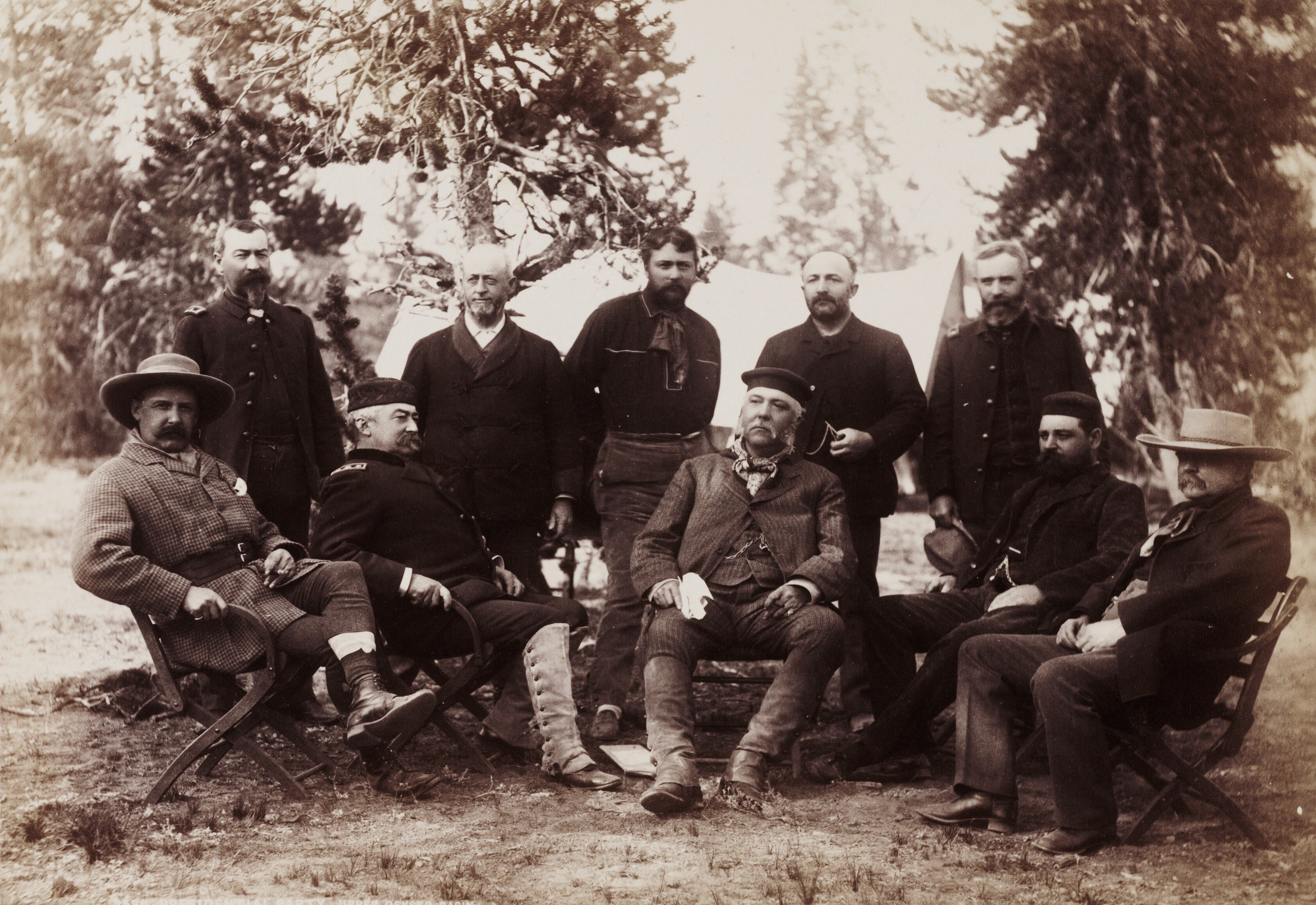
Arthur on an expedition in Yellowstone National Park along with Philip Sheridan and Robert Todd Lincoln

=== Declining health ===
Shortly after becoming president, Arthur was diagnosed with Bright's disease, a kidney ailment now referred to as nephritis. He attempted to keep his condition private, but by 1883 rumors of his illness began to circulate; he had become thinner and more aged in appearance, and struggled to keep the pace of the presidency. To rejuvenate his health outside the confines of Washington, Arthur and some political friends traveled to Florida in April 1883. The vacation had the opposite effect, and Arthur suffered from intense pain before returning to Washington. Shortly after returning from Florida, Arthur visited his home town of New York City, where he presided over the opening of the Brooklyn Bridge. In July, on the advice of Missouri Senator George Graham Vest, he visited Yellowstone National Park. Reporters accompanied the presidential party, helping to publicize the new National Park system. The Yellowstone trip was more beneficial to Arthur's health than his Florida excursion, and he returned to Washington refreshed after two months of travel.

=== 1884 election ===
As the election approached, Arthur came to realize that, like Hayes in 1880, he was unlikely to win nomination in 1884. In the months leading up to the 1884 Republican National Convention, James G. Blaine emerged as the favorite for the nomination, though Arthur had not totally given up on his hopes for another term. It quickly became clear to Arthur, however, that neither of the major party factions was prepared to give him their full support: the Half-Breeds were again solidly behind Blaine, while the Stalwarts were undecided. Some Stalwarts backed Arthur, but others supported Senator John A. Logan of Illinois. Reform-minded Republicans, friendlier to Arthur after he endorsed civil service reform, were still not certain enough of his reform credentials to back him over Senator George F. Edmunds of Vermont, who had long favored their cause. Some business leaders supported Arthur, as did Southern Republicans who owed their jobs to his control of the patronage, but by the time they began to rally around him, Arthur had decided against a serious campaign for the nomination. He kept up a token effort, believing that to drop out would cast doubt on his actions in office and raise questions about his health, but by the time the convention began in June, his defeat was assured. Blaine led on the first ballot, and by the fourth ballot he had a majority. Arthur telegraphed his congratulations to Blaine and accepted his defeat with equanimity. Arthur is the most recent individual to accede to the presidency after the death of a predecessor but be denied his party's nomination to a full term. (Note: Arthur is also most recent sitting president to serve for one full term or less and be denied his party's nomination. More recent sitting presidents, including Lyndon B. Johnson, have unsuccessfully sought their party's nomination after serving for more than one full term.)

Democrat Grover Cleveland defeated Republican James G. Blaine in the 1884 election

Arthur played no role in the 1884 campaign, which Blaine would later blame for his loss that November to the Democratic nominee, Grover Cleveland. Blaine's campaign was damaged by the defection of the Mugwumps, a group of Republicans who believed that the Pendleton Act had not sufficiently diminished public corruption. Blaine also made a critical error in the swing state of New York when he failed to distance himself from an attack on Catholicism. Cleveland swept the Solid South and won enough Northern states to take a majority of the electoral vote. A change of just 1,000 votes in New York would have given Blaine the presidency. Cleveland's victory made him the first Democrat to win a presidential election since the Civil War.

== Historical reputation ==
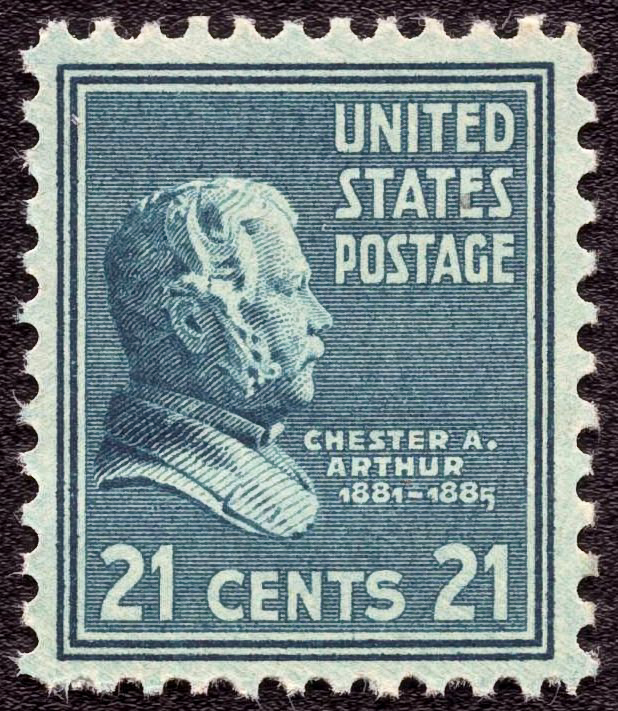
Arthur appears on the 21-cent U.S. Postage stamp of the 1938 Presidential Series.

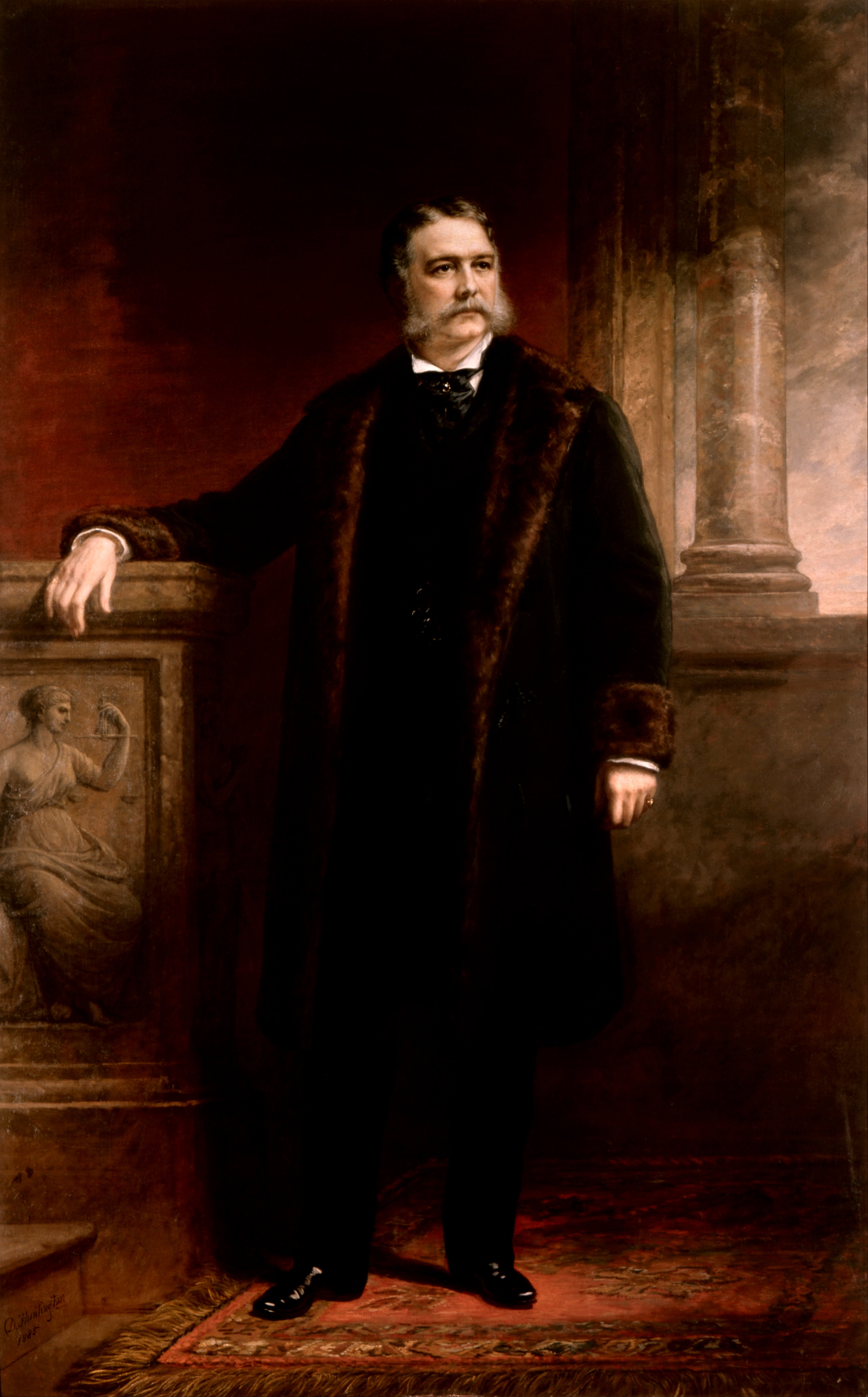
Daniel Huntington - Chester Alan Arthur

Arthur's tepid popularity in life carried over into his assessment by historians, and his reputation after leaving office disappeared. By 1935, historian George F. Howe said that Arthur had achieved "an obscurity in strange contrast to his significant part in American history." By 1975, however, Thomas C. Reeves would write that Arthur's "appointments, if unspectacular, were unusually sound; the corruption and scandal that dominated business and politics of the period did not tarnish his administration." As 2004 biographer Zachary Karabell wrote, although Arthur was "physically stretched and emotionally strained, he strove to do what was right for the country." Indeed, Howe had earlier surmised, "Arthur adopted [a code] for his own political behavior but subject to three restraints: he remained to everyone a man of his word; he kept scrupulously free from corrupt graft; he maintained a personal dignity, affable and genial though he might be. These restraints ... distinguished him sharply from the stereotype politician." In his final assessment of Arthur, Karabell argues that Arthur lacked the vision or force of character to achieve greatness, but that he deserves credit for presiding over a period of peace and prosperity.

Polls of historians and political scientists have generally ranked Arthur as a below-average president. A 2018 poll of the American Political Science Association’s Presidents and Executive Politics section ranked Arthur as the 29th best president. A 2017 C-SPAN survey has Chester Arthur ranked among the bottom third of presidents of all time, right below Martin Van Buren and above Herbert Hoover. The survey asked 91 presidential historians to rank the 43 former presidents (including then-outgoing president Barack Obama) in various categories to come up with a composite score, resulting in an overall ranking. Arthur was ranked 35th among all former presidents (down from 32nd in 2009 and 2000). His rankings in the various categories of this most recent poll were as follows: public persuasion (37), crisis leadership (32), economic management (31), moral authority (35), international relations (35), administrative skills (28), relations with congress (29), vision/setting an agenda (34), pursued equal justice for all (27), performance with context of times (32).

== Bibliography ==
=== Books ===
- Abbot, Willis J. (1896). The Naval History of the United States. Vol. 2. Peter Fenelon Collier. OCLC 3453791.
- Ayers, Edward L. (2007) [1992]. The Promise of the New South: Life After Reconstruction. New York: Oxford University Press, USA. ISBN 978-0-19-532688-8.
- Doenecke, Justus D. (1981). The Presidencies of James A. Garfield and Chester A. Arthur. Lawrence, Kansas: University Press of Kansas. ISBN 978-0-7006-0208-7.
- Feldman, Ruth Tenzer (2006). Chester A. Arthur. Twenty-First Century Books. ISBN 978-0-8225-1512-8.
- Graff, Henry F., ed. The Presidents: A Reference History (3rd ed. 2002) online
- Hoogenboom, Ari (1995). Rutherford Hayes: Warrior and President. Lawrence, Kansas: University Press of Kansas. ISBN 978-0-7006-0641-2.
- Howe, George F. (1966) [1935]. Chester A. Arthur, A Quarter-Century of Machine Politics. New York: F. Ungar Pub. Co. ASIN B00089DVIG.
- Karabell, Zachary (2004). Chester Alan Arthur. New York: Henry Holt & Co. ISBN 978-0-8050-6951-8.
- Pletcher, David M. The Awkward Years: American Foreign Relations under Garfield and Arthur (U of Missouri Press, 1962). online
- Reeves, Thomas C. (1975). Gentleman Boss: The Life of Chester A. Arthur. New York: Alfred A. Knopf. ISBN 978-0-394-46095-6.
- Weisberger, Bernard A. (2002). Henry F. Graff (ed.). The Presidents A Reference History James A. Garfield and Chester A. Arthur. Charles Scribners's Sons.
- White, Richard (2017). The Republic for Which It Stands: The United States During Reconstruction and the Gilded Age: 1865–1896. New York: Oxford University Press. ISBN 9780190619060.

=== Articles ===
- Bastert, Russell H. (March 1956). "Diplomatic Reversal: Frelinghuysen's Opposition to Blaine's Pan-American Policy in 1882". The Mississippi Valley Historical Review. 42 (4): 653–671. doi:10.2307/1889232. JSTOR 1889232.
- "Chester A. Arthur". New York City Statues. Archived from the original on 2012-10-13.
- Clary, Zachary (2021). "A Smoking Gun and a Woman's Touch: President Chester Arthur's Transformation that Reformed American Politics in the Late Nineteenth Century". Penn History Review. 27 (1): 6+. Archived from the original on August 14, 2021.
- Hutchinson, C.P. (April 1947). "The Present Status of Our Immigration Laws and Policies". The Milbank Memorial Fund Quarterly. 25 (2): 161–173. doi:10.2307/3348178. JSTOR 3348178.
- Gaughan, Anthony J. "Chester Arthur's Ghost: A Cautionary Tale of Campaign Finance Reform." Mercer Law Review 71 (2019): 779+.
- Todd, A. L. (June 1960). "Ordeal In The Arctic". American Heritage. Vol. 11, no. 4.
- Marszalek, John F. Jr. (August 1971). "A Black Cadet At West Point". American Heritage. 22 (5).
- "Monuments At Albany" (PDF). The New York Times. January 7, 1894.
- Perry, Warren (January 8, 2023). "Chester Arthur: A Birthplace Controversy, 1880". National Portrait Gallery Smithsonian. Archived from the original on January 8, 2023.
- Reeves, Thomas C. (Summer 1972). "The Search for the Chester Alan Arthur Papers". The Wisconsin Magazine of History. 55 (4): 310–319. JSTOR 4634741.
- Reeves, Thomas C. (Autumn 1970). "The Mystery of Chester Alan Arthur's Birthplace". Vermont History. 38 (4): 300.
- Stuart, Paul (September 1977). "United States Indian Policy: From the Dawes Act to the American Indian Policy Review Commission". Social Service Review. 51 (3): 451–463. doi:10.1086/643524. JSTOR 30015511. S2CID 143506388.
- Theriault, Sean M. (February 2003). "Patronage, the Pendleton Act, and the Power of the People". The Journal of Politics. 65 (1): 50–68. doi:10.1111/1468-2508.t01-1-00003. JSTOR 3449855. S2CID 153890814.
- Jampoler, Andrew C.A. (August 2010). "Disaster at Lady Franklin Bay". Naval History Magazine. Vol. 24, no. 4. U.S. Naval Institute.
- Arrington, Benjamin T. (October 5, 2016). "President Chester A. Arthur". We're History.
- "Chester A. Arthur Fourth Annual Message". The American Presidency Project. December 1, 1884.
