= 145th New York Infantry Regiment =

Union Army infantry unit during the American Civil War

- Active: September 11, 1862 (mustered in)–December 9, 1863 (disbanded and members transferred)
- Disbanded: December 9, 1863
- Country: United States
- Allegiance: Union
- Branch: Infantry
- Size: Regiment
- Engagements: American Civil War: Mud March; Battle of Chancellorsville; Battle of Gettysburg; Battle of Williamsport; Battle of Robertson's Ford

Insignia
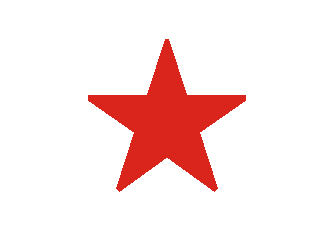
- 1st Division, XII Corps

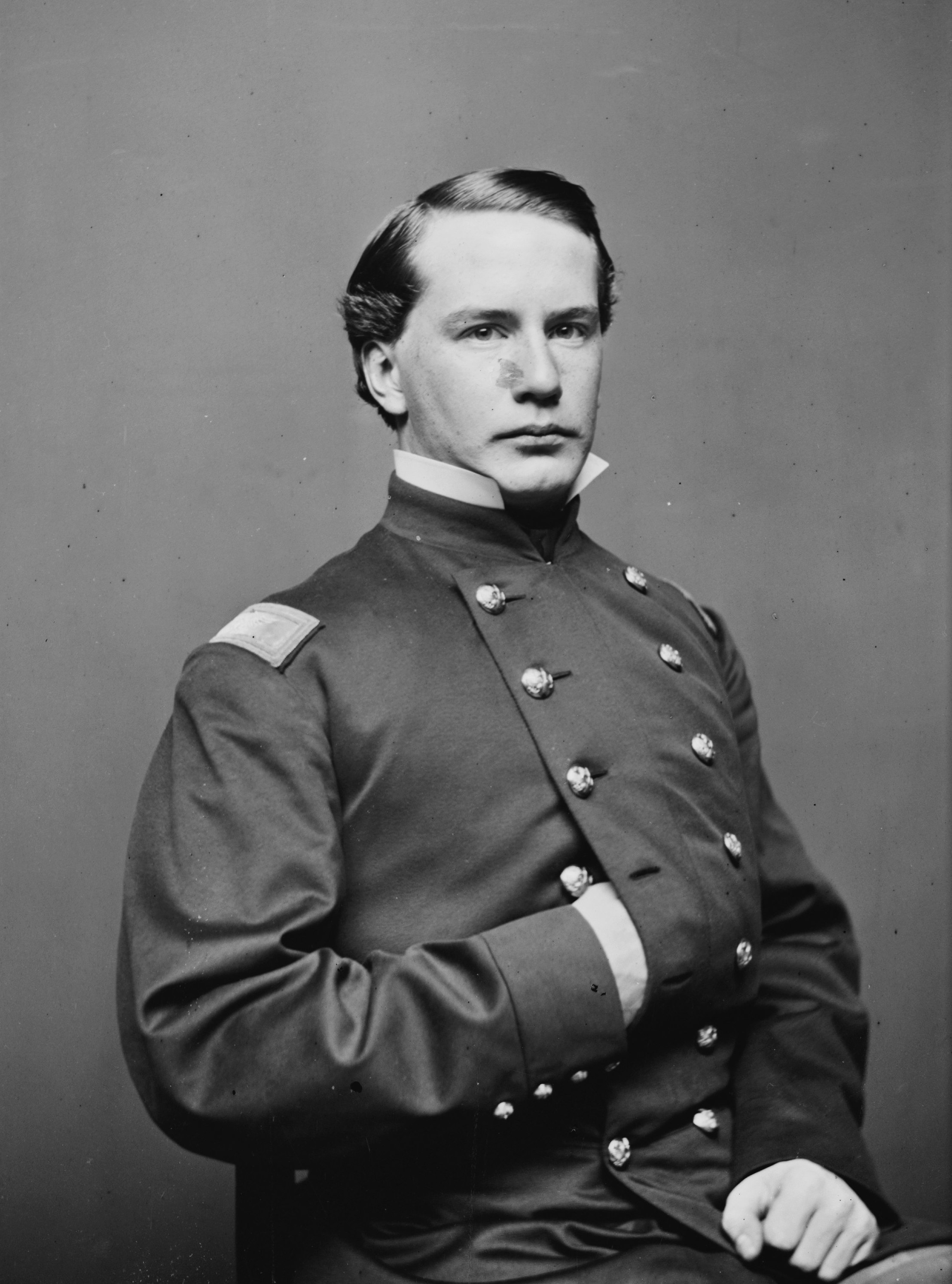
Col. Edward L. Price, 145th New York Volunteer Infantry

The 145th New York Infantry Regiment, the "Stanton Legion", was an infantry regiment of the Union Army during the American Civil War.

== Service ==
It was organized at Staten Island, and there mustered in the service of the United States for three years September 11, 1862. The companies were recruited principally:

- A, B, C, D, E, F, H and I at New York City;
- G at Patchogue, Staten Island and New York City, and
- K at Hempstead, Oyster Bay, Staten Island and New York City.

The regiment left the State September 27, 1862; it served in the 2d Brigade, 2d Division, 12th Corps, Army of the Potomac, from September 30, 1862; in the 2d Brigade, 1st Division, 12th Corps, from April, 1863; in the 1st Brigade, 1st Division, 12th Corps, from May, 1863; and, December 9, 1863, the enlisted men were transferred to the 107th, 123rd and 150th Infantry, and the regiment discontinued.

== Total strength and casualties ==
During its service the regiment lost by death, killed in action, 1 officer, 6 enlisted men; of wounds received in action, 8 enlisted men; of disease and other causes, 35 enlisted men; total, 1 officer, 49 enlisted men; aggregate, 50; of whom 1 enlisted man died in the hands of the enemy.

== Commanders ==
- Colonel William H. Allen
- Colonel Edward Livingston Price
- Lieutenant Colonel Ole Peter Hansen Balling
- Lieutenant Colonel Roswell L. Van Wagenen
- Major R. L. Van Wagenen
- Major George W. Reid

== See also ==
- List of New York Civil War regiments
