= Angel G. Luévano =

American labor leader and activist (born 1949)

- Angel G. Luévano
- Born: October 1, 1949; Santa Paula, California, USA
- Education: Hastings College of the Law
- Political party: Democrat
- Spouse: Argentina Dávila-Luévano

Ángel Godinez Luévano (/luˈeɪvənoʊ/; born October 1, 1949) is an American labor leader and activist who was the principal litigant in the class action suit Luévano v. Campbell. He is also a graduate of the Hastings College of the Law.

== Background ==
Luévano, who is of Mexican-American ethnicity, went on to work as a career civil servant with OFCCP. He eventually served as the deputy director of the Division of Program Operations in its national office. After serving three terms as State Director for California of LULAC, He also served as National Vice President for the Far-West Region of LULAC.
