= Luévano v. Campbell =

1981 US civil rights court case

- Court: United States District Court for the District of Columbia
- Full case name: Angel G. Luévano, et al., Plaintiffs v. Alan Campbell, Director, Office of Personnel Management, et al.
- Decided: November 19, 1981
- Defendant: Alan K. Campbell
- Plaintiff: Angel G. Luévano
- Citation: 93 F.R.D. 68 (D.D.C. 1981)

Court membership
- Judge sitting: Joyce Hens Green

Luévano v. Campbell, 93 F.R.D. 68 (D.D.C. 1981), was a class action lawsuit brought by Angel G. Luévano and a group of civil rights attorneys on behalf of African Americans and Hispanics who had failed the Professional and Administrative Career Examination (PACE), a written test used by the Civil Service Commission to screen candidates for federal employment. The plaintiffs alleged that the exam had a disparate impact on minority applicants, in violation of Title VII of the Civil Rights Act of 1964.

== Background ==
The class-action suit was filed against Alan Campbell, director of the Office of Personnel Management (then known as the Civil Service Commission), in the U.S. District Court for the District of Columbia. Though Campbell was the named defendant in the case, approximately 45 other federal departments and agencies, all agencies that had ever used the PACE, were listed as representatives of the defendant class.

PACE was the principal entry-level test administered to candidates for positions in the federal government's executive branch. The suit asked the judge to declare that OPM, by using the test, had deprived the plaintiffs of rights secured by Title VII.

== Luévano consent decree ==
The Luévano consent decree is the 1981 agreement that settled the lawsuit and called for the elimination of PACE and required replacing it with alternative examinations. It had been criticized by the late constitutional scholar Walter Berns as creating a system of backdoor racial quotas for hiring in the federal government. In response to the consent decree, OPM developed the Administrative Careers with America examination, which is used in some cases. The consent decree also established two special hiring programs, Outstanding Scholar and Bilingual/Bicultural, for limited use in filling former PACE positions.

== Termination ==
In August 2025, the Trump administration repudiated the Luévano consent decree. Assistant Attorney General Harmeet K. Dhillon stated: "For over four decades, this decree has hampered the federal government from hiring the top talent of our nation. Today, the Justice Department removed that barrier."

== See also ==
- List of class-action lawsuits
