= Leroy D. Thoman =

American lawyer

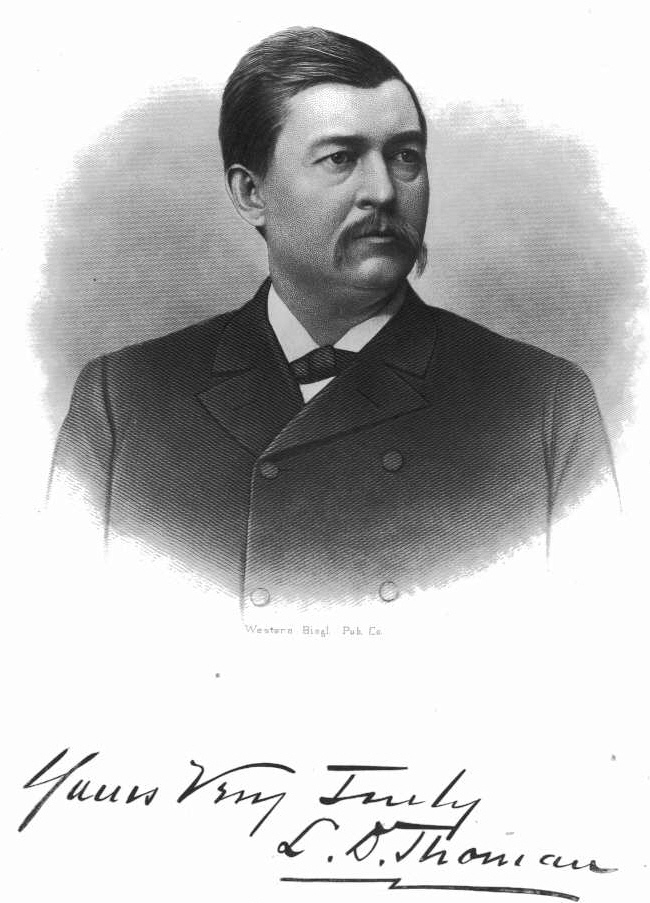
Leroy D. Thoman

Leroy Delano Thoman (July 31, 1851 – April 19, 1909) was an American judge and civil service commissioner.

== Biography ==
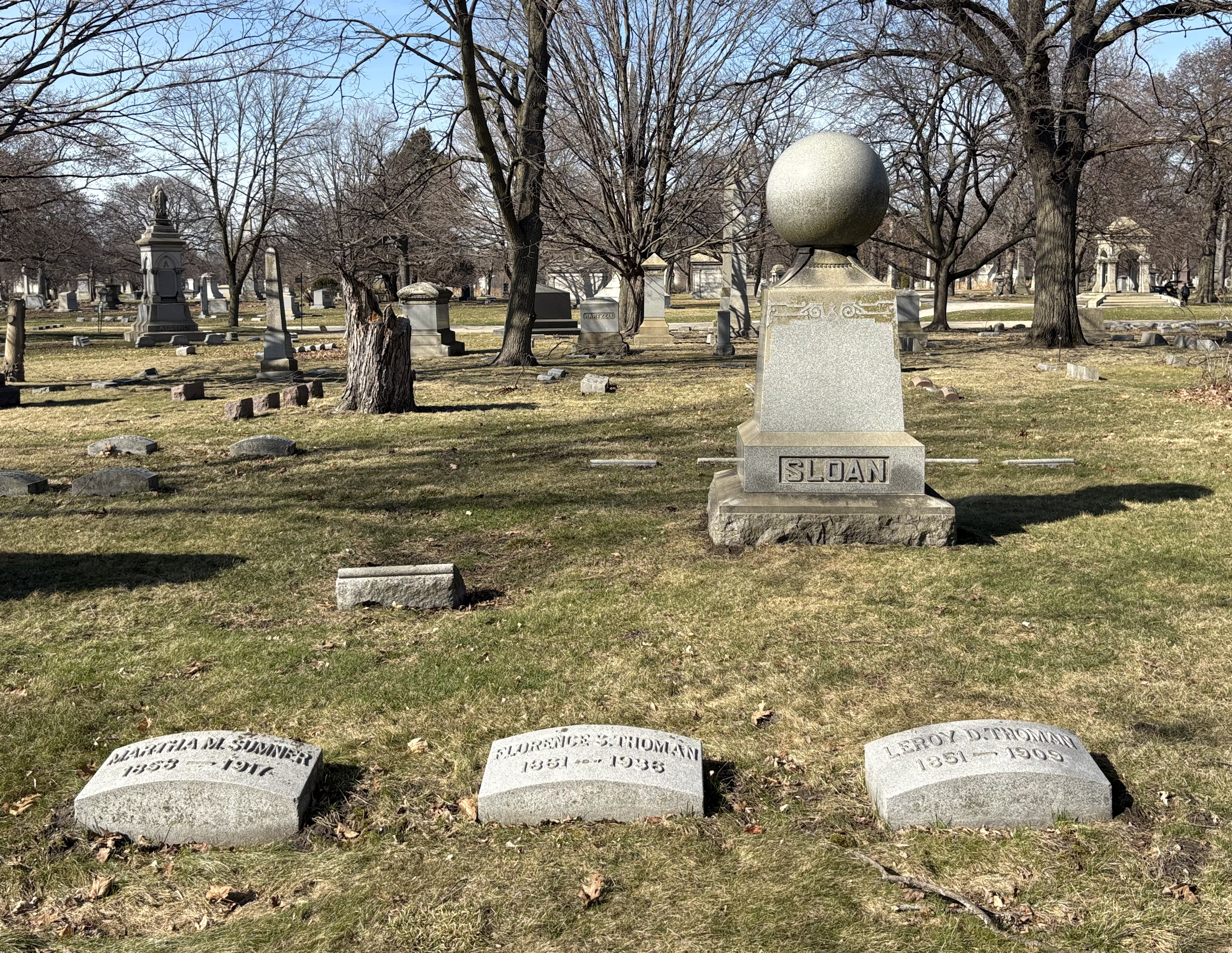
Thoman's grave at Rosehill Cemetery

Thoman was born in Salem, Ohio, July 31, 1851. He was educated in the common schools and became a teacher at the age of sixteen. After five years of teaching, he studied the law and was admitted to the bar. Shortly thereafter, Thoman was appointed Deputy Prosecuting Attorney for the Ninth Judicial District of Indiana. In January 1873, he resigned his position and moved to Youngstown, Ohio to practice law there, forming a partnership with Isaac A. Justice. In 1875, he was elected county judge of Mahoning County, and remained on the bench for six years. In 1876, he married Mary E. Cripps, but she died that same year.

Thoman became involved with Democratic politics in Ohio and, in 1880, presided over the party's state convention. That same year, he ran for Congress in Ohio's 17th congressional district against William McKinley, but was unsuccessful. He retired from the bench in 1882 and resumed his law practice, representing the Pittsburgh & Lake Erie Railroad. The next year, after the passage of the Pendleton Civil Service Reform Act, President Chester A. Arthur nominated Thoman to be one of three members of the United States Civil Service Commission. He served in that office until 1885. In 1887, he moved to Chicago and worked to bring the World's Fair there. Thoman married again to Florence B. Smith in 1892. They had one daughter, Dorothy, born in 1893.

Thoman died at his home in Evanston, Illinois, in 1909, and was buried at Rosehill Cemetery in Chicago.
