= Ole Peter Hansen Balling =

Norwegian painter (1823–1906)

Ole Peter Hansen Balling (13 April 1823 – 1 May 1906) was a Norwegian artist. Balling is most commonly associated with his portraits, several of which are featured in the National Portrait Gallery in Washington, D.C.

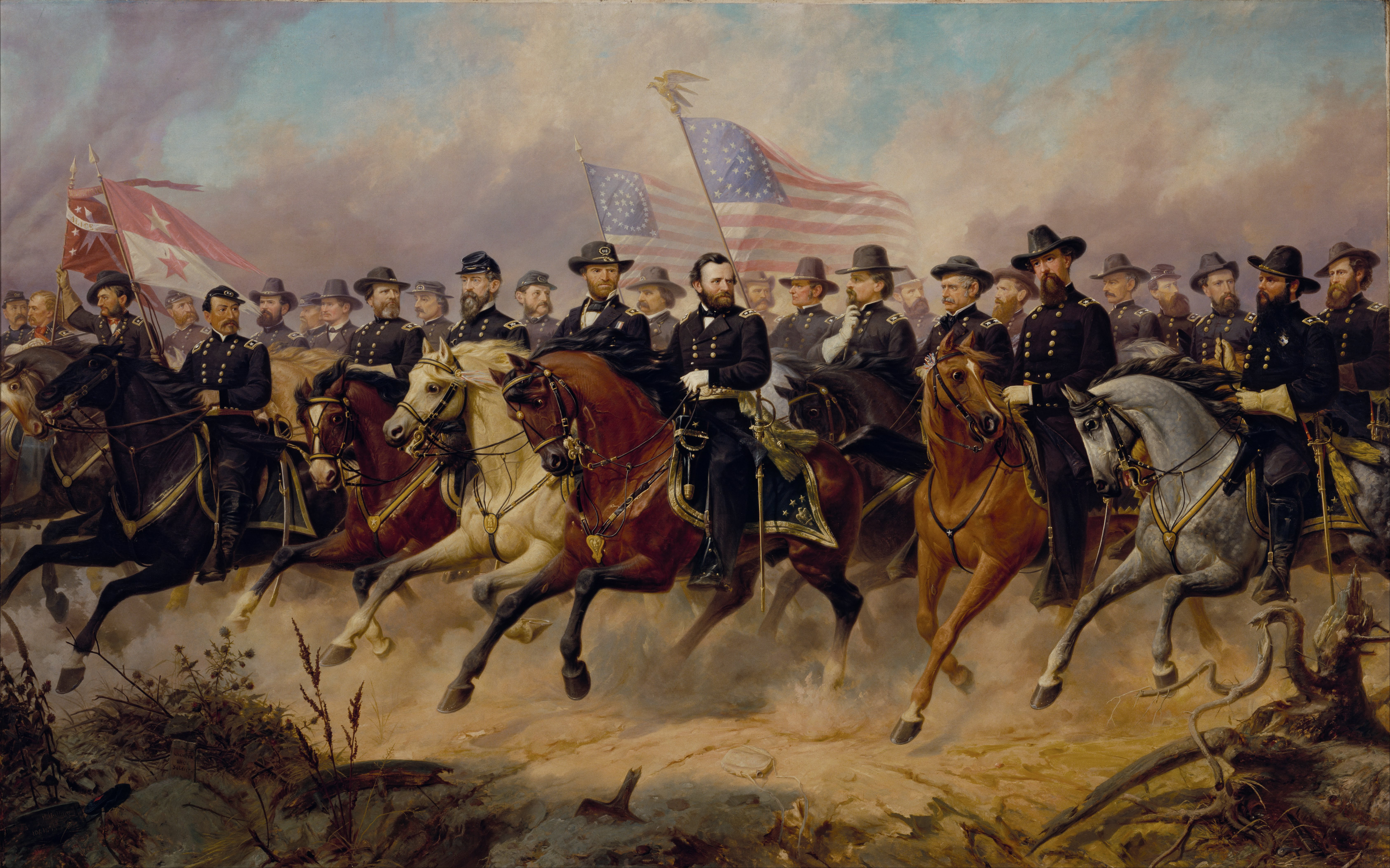
Grant and his Generals (1865) by Ole Peter Hansen Balling. National Portrait Gallery

== Biography ==
Born in Kristiania (now Oslo), Balling was a student of Norwegian artist Ferdinand Jonas Gjøs (1790–1852) and trained under Danish decorative painter Jacob Emilius Wunderlich (1809–1892). He was a student at art academies both at the Academy of Arts, Berlin (1843–1845) and the Royal Danish Academy of Fine Arts in Copenhagen (1846–1848) and in 1854 studied with Thomas Couture in Paris. He made his debut at the Charlottenborg Spring Exhibition in 1852.

Balling volunteered in the First Schleswig-Holstein War and became a Danish officer in 1848. He emigrated to the United States in 1856, where he lived until 1874. He commanded the 145th New York Volunteer Infantry Regiment during the American Civil War. Balling depicted several Union army generals, including a portrait of Ulysses S. Grant and another painting of Grant and his generals, and portraits of Philip Sheridan, John Sedgwick, and James S. Wadsworth. In addition, he created portraits of prominent American statesmen, including presidents Chester Arthur and James Garfield, as well as the abolitionist John Brown.

In 1874, Balling returned to Norway to operate a painter workshop in Horten, at the time the site of Karljohansvern, the main base for the Royal Norwegian Navy. Here he painted portraits of several Norwegian naval officers. In addition, he completed portraits of members of the Royal Bernadotte family including Kings Charles XIV John of Sweden, Oscar I of Sweden, Charles XV of Sweden and Oscar II of Sweden.

Between 1881 and 1890, Balling lived and worked in Mexico City. After returning to Norway in 1890, he became Mexican consul in Kristiania. His last visit to New York City was in 1895–96. He died on 1 May 1906 in Kristiania.

Balling is also represented in the National Portrait Gallery in Washington, D.C., West Point Military Academy in New York and the United States Naval Academy in Annapolis, Maryland, the Royal Norwegian Navy Museum in Horten and the National Museum of Art, Architecture and Design in Oslo.

== Awards ==
- Order of the Dannebrog – Denmark

== Gallery ==
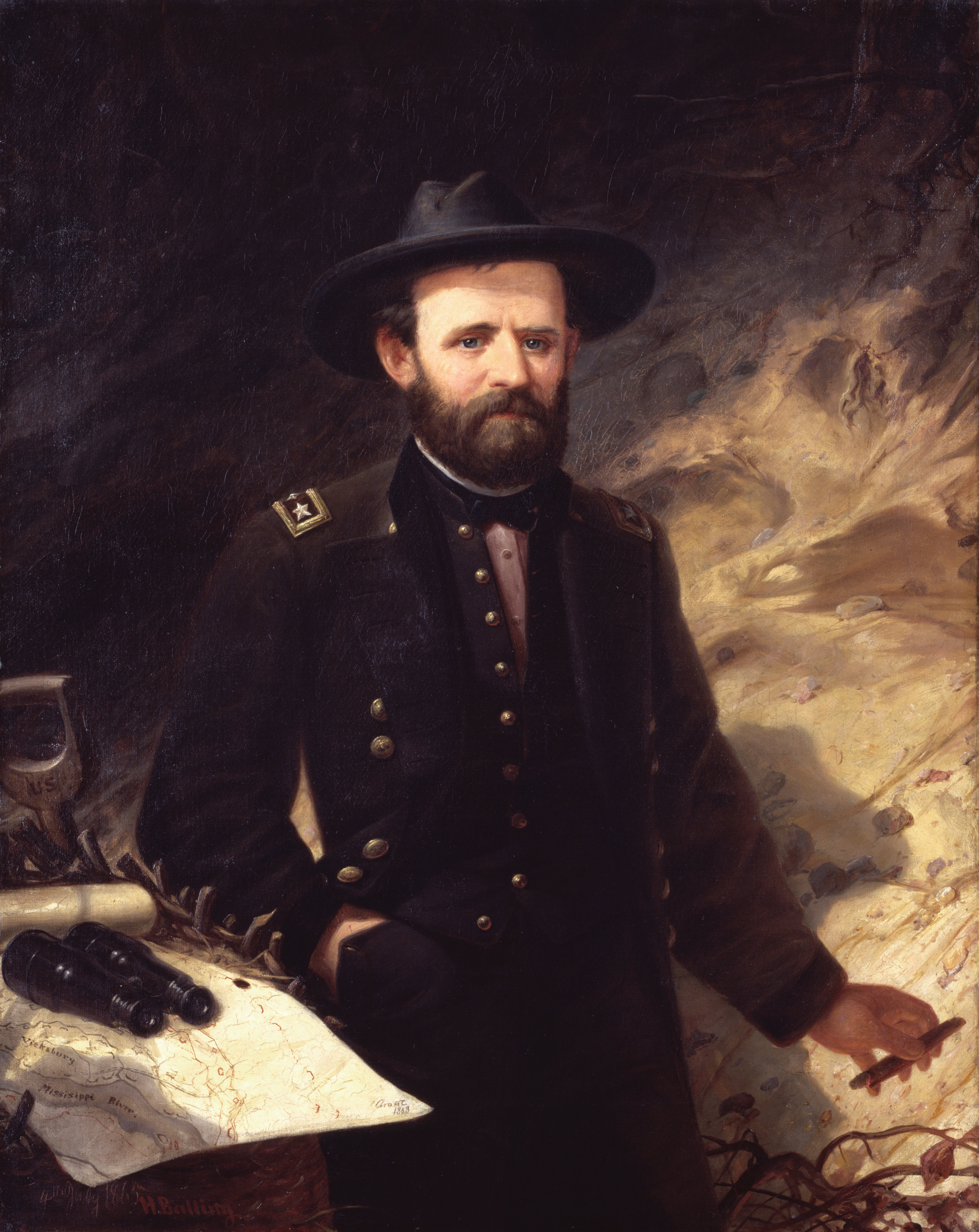
Portrait of Ulysses S. Grant

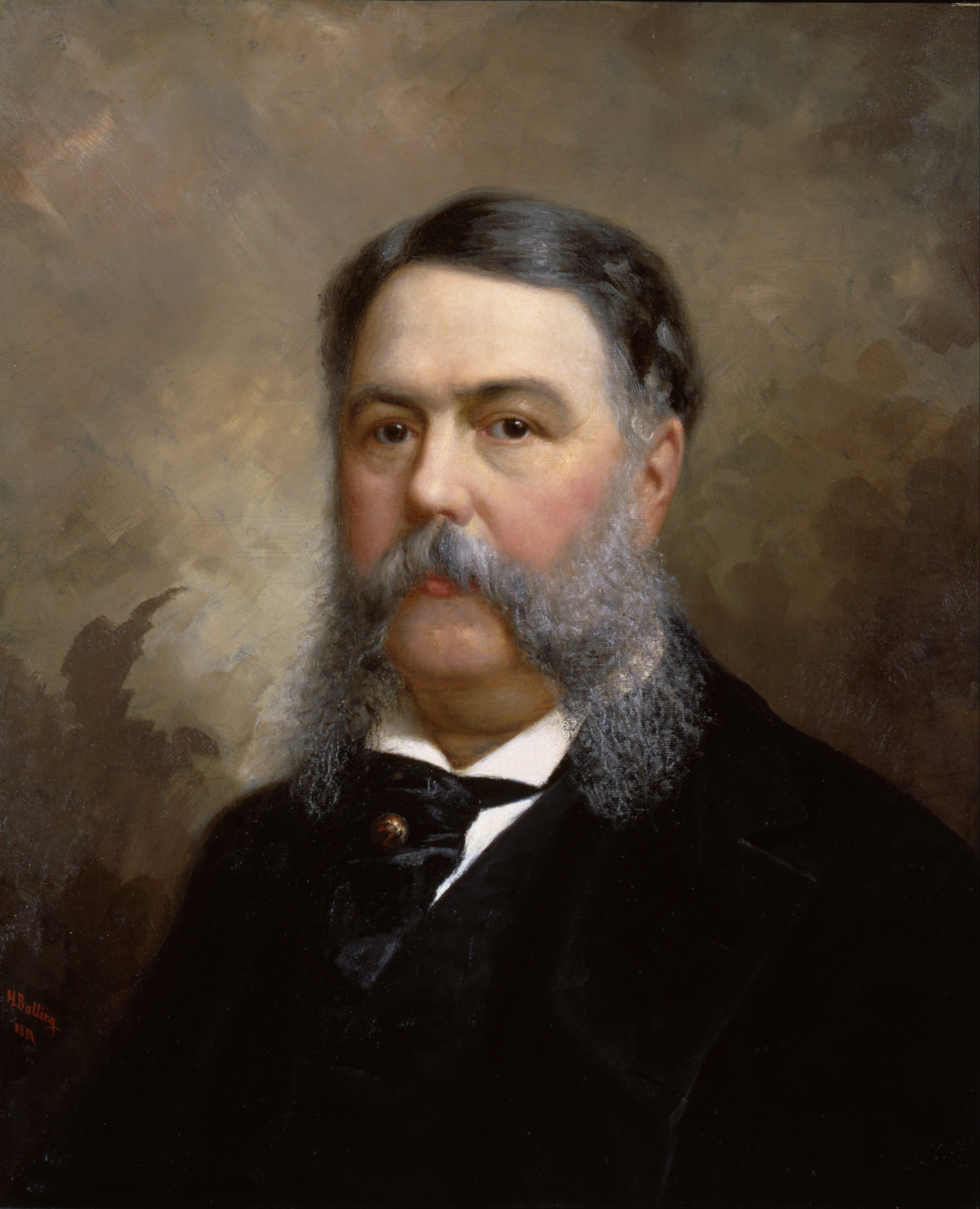
Portrait of Chester A. Arthur

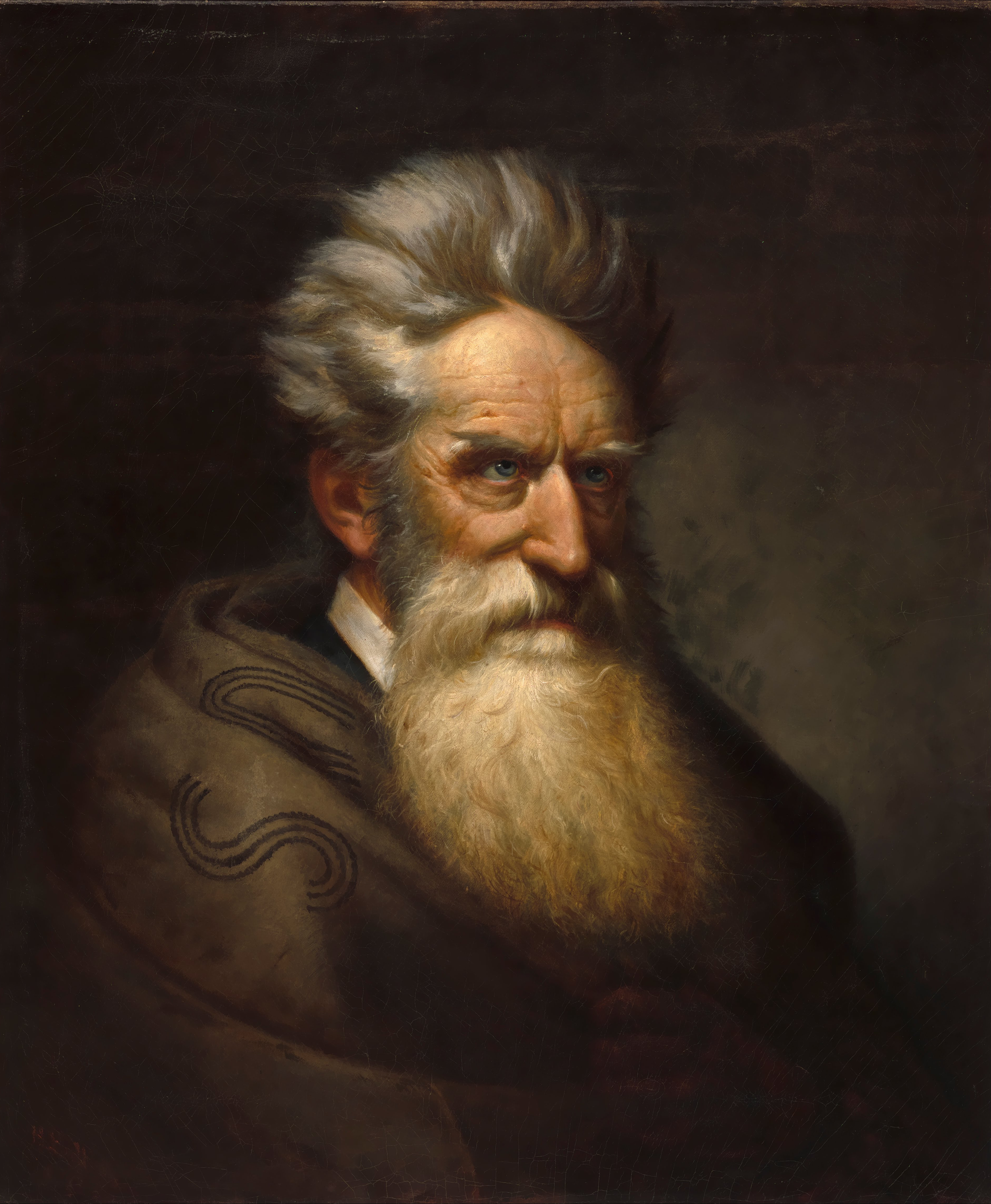
Portrait of John Brown

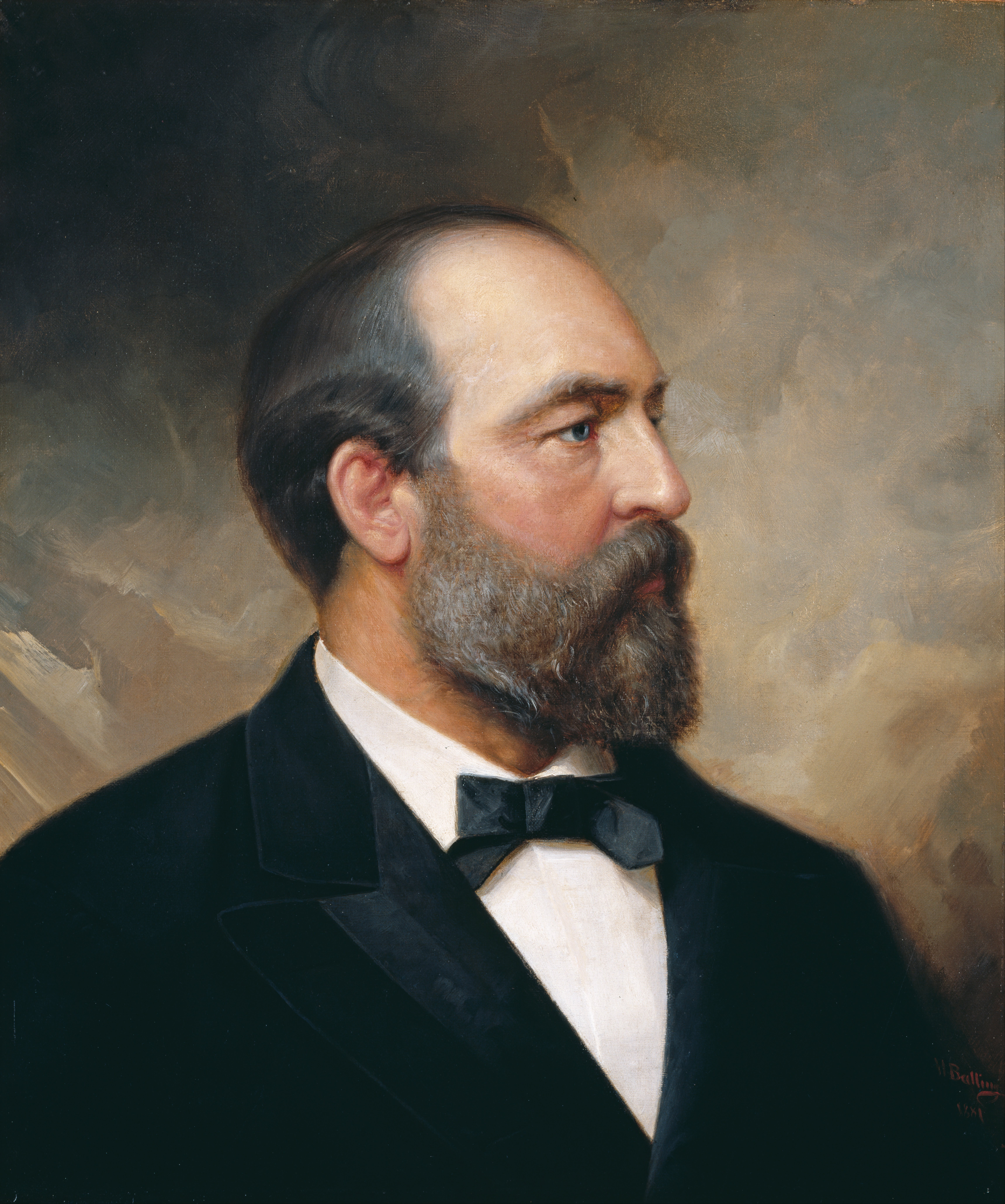
Portrait of James A. Garfield

== Other sources ==
- Carr, Carolyn Kinder; Ellen G. Miles (2001) A Brush with History : Paintings from the National Portrait Gallery (National Portrait Gallery, Smithsonian Institution) ISBN 978-1584650805
- Holzer, Harold; Mark E. Neely Jr, (2000) The Union Image: Popular Prints of the Civil War North (The University of North Carolina Press.) ISBN 978-0807825105
- Lewis, R. W. B.; Nancy Lewis (2001) American Characters: Selections from the National Portrait Gallery (Yale University Press, 1999) ISBN 978-0300078954

== Related Reading ==
- Bricka, Carl Frederik (2001) Dansk biografisk lexikon, tillige omfattende Norge for tidsrummet 1537 – 1814: Bind 7 (Adamant Media Corporation) ISBN 978-0543730701 (In Danish)
