= Fire officer =

Fire officer can refer to:

- A senior firefighter
- Fire safety officer, an individual employed by an organisation, including a fire service, to advise on fire safety
