= Bath fire station =

Fire station in Bath, England

Coordinates: 51°23′20″N 2°21′17″W

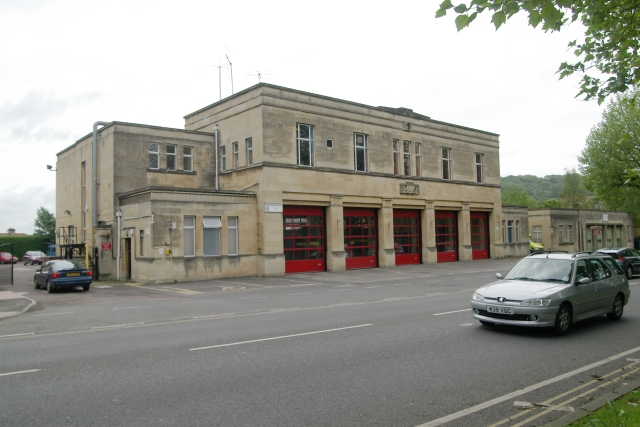
Principal south-west elevation of the main building

Bath fire station was located in Bathwick Street in Bath, Somerset, and operated by the Avon Fire and Rescue Service. Design work commenced in 1937 by architect Alfred J. Taylor, but following his death in 1938, the bulk of the design was carried out by his daughter, Molly Taylor, in the Art Deco style. The fire station, which opened in July 1939, has been cited as a rare surviving example of a building designed by a woman in that era.

The station has been expanded since with an adjoining ambulance station and additional workshops, offices and training spaces installed. In 2016 the fire service earmarked the site for redevelopment due to structural and functional issues. They have proposed to demolish the existing structures and construct a modern replacement. The proposal has been opposed by the Twentieth Century Society.

The fire station was demolished in June 2026.

== History ==
The local government of Bath had operated a fire brigade since at least 1915 when a fire station was established near to the Guildhall. Following the expansion of the brigade with new motorised vehicles the need for a larger fire station was identified in 1920. Plans did not proceed until the late 1930s when a site on Bathwick Street, formerly used as a landfill, was identified. Alfred J. Taylor was appointed architect in 1937 but died the following year and his daughter, Molly Taylor, was responsible for completing the majority of the design. The station was opened by Lieutenant-Colonel Sir Vivian Henderson in July 1939. Henderson remarked at the opening that the local authority had "I am glad that you have had the wisdom to employ as your architect a lady to design this building. As a married man I know full well the meaning of a woman’s touch, and for those who will have to work here it will be a comfort to have that same touch here".

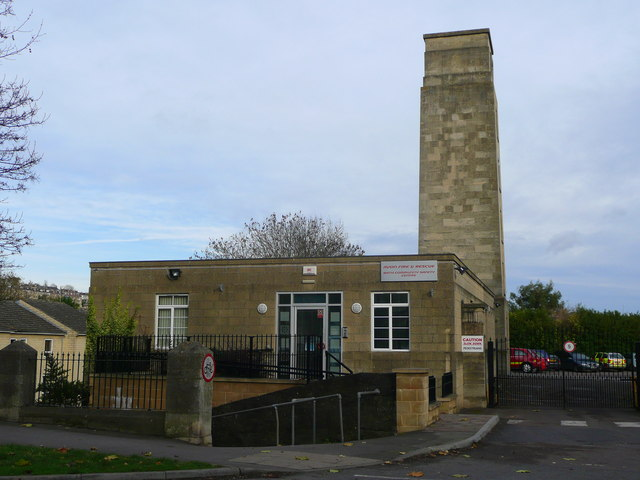
Ancillary building with training tower

Firefighters from the station were called into action during the Second World War, including during the 1942 Baedeker Blitz raids intended to target culturally significant British cities. That same year saw the station expanded with an extension to the rear of the first floor. In 1960 an ambulance station was added to the south of the site, adjoining the fire station which was also expanded with a floor added to its southern wing and new vehicle workshops erected. Between 1968 and 1971 a single storey office building was erected to the north of the site alongside a hose store, workshop and fire practice area. Following reorganisation the station is now operated by Avon Fire and Rescue Service (AFRS) and houses full-time and retained firefighters as well as fire safety officers and support staff. It is one of the oldest stations operated by the service.

=== Proposed replacement ===
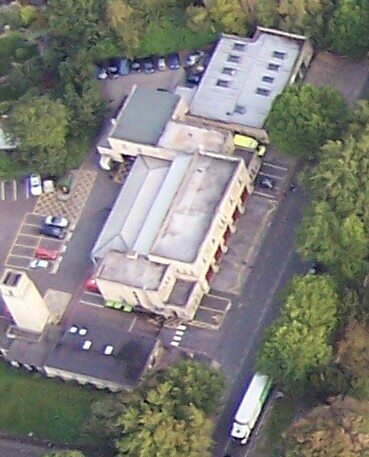
Aerial view, the adjoining structure at the top of this photograph is the ambulance station

The station was identified by AFRS as in need of redevelopment in 2016 because of poor functionality, high running costs and potential ground stability issues. They also wish to improve energy efficiency of the station, increase the amount of outdoor and office space on the site and implement modern decontamination processes. The current station has only five vehicle bays to accommodate the six appliances based there and these bays are too narrow to suit modern equipment, leading to collisions. AFRS has proposed demolishing the existing buildings and erecting a new three-storey fire station in buff brick and Bath stone, with six appliance bays, a rooftop terrace and an additional 320 square metres (3,400 sq ft) of office space. They estimate that the new facility will reduce energy consumption by 30%. The plan is to commence works by 2026 and Willmott Dixon has been appointed contractor. During the works the firefighters and appliances based at the site would operate from a temporary location elsewhere in the city. The only part of the existing structure that is proposed to be retained is the crest, currently above the appliance bays, which would be taken down and reused near the entrance to the new building.

The proposed demolition is opposed by the Twentieth Century Society who have submitted an application to Historic England for the fire station to be granted statutory protection as a listed building. The Society say that the station is of considerable historic interest as a rare example of a work from the pre-war period by a female architect. AFRS opposes the listing on the basis that it would make it more difficult to upgrade the structure. The site is also located in the Bathwick Character Area of the Bath Conservation Area and within the UNESCO Bath World Heritage Site.

== Description ==
The site encompasses 0.39 hectares (0.96 acres). The main fire station building is of two storeys and constructed in a classicised Art Deco style; it is clad in Bath stone. The vehicle bays are separated by Doric pilasters with fluted capitals. Above the bays is a stepped architrave, above which the crest is mounted, and there is a cornice running at first floor level. The building's original flag pole has been removed and lettering above the appliance bays reading "City of Bath Fire Station" has also been obliterated. The original appliance bay doors have been replaced but it is believed by the 20th Century Society to retain original tiles, parquet flooring and architraves. The training tower is also clad in Bath stone and is six storeys high.

== See also ==
- Women in architecture
