= Energy Efficiency and Conservation Block Grants =

The Energy Efficiency and Conservation Block Grant (EECBG) is a program in the United States, which provides federal grants to units of local government, Indian tribes, states, and territories to reduce energy use and fossil fuel emissions, and for improvements in energy efficiency.

== Administration ==
The EECBG Program is administered by the Office of Weatherization and Intergovernmental Programs in the Office of Energy Efficiency and Renewable Energy—EERE of the United States Department of Energy—DOE.

== Purpose ==
The Energy Efficiency and Conservation Block Grants funding will support energy audits and energy efficiency retrofits in residential and commercial buildings, the development and implementation of advanced building codes and inspections, and the creation of financial incentive programs for energy efficiency improvements.

The grant funds could also go towards transportation programs that conserve energy, projects to reduce and capture methane emissions from landfills, renewable energy installations on government buildings, energy efficient traffic signals and street lights, combined heat and power systems, district heating and cooling systems, and other projects.

== Legislation ==
The Program was authorized in Title V, Subtitle E of the Energy Independence and Security Act of 2007 (EISA), and signed into Public Law (PL 110-140) on December 19, 2007. The American Recovery and Reinvestment Act of 2009 appropriated $3.2 billion for the Energy Efficiency and Conservation Block Grant (EECBG) Program.

== See also ==
- General Services Administration
- Index—Energy conservation
