= Section 1603 grants =

Section 1603 of the American Recovery and Reinvestment Tax Act (ARRTA) was a green energy subsidy program created by Congress and signed into law as a part of the 2009 stimulus package. The program was a system of cash grants that was implemented by the U.S. Treasury Department's "Payments for Specified Energy Projects in Lieu of Tax Credits."

== Purpose ==
Electricity Generation from Solar
Year	Energy (TWh)	% of total
2004	2.6	0.01%
2005	3.7	0.02%
2006	5.0	0.03%
2007	6.8	0.03%
2008	11.4	0.06%
2009	19.3	0.10%
2010	31.4	0.15%
2011	60.6	0.27%
2012	96.7	0.43%
2013	134.5	0.58%
2014	185.9	0.79%
2015	253.0	1.05%
Source: BP-Statistical Review of World Energy, 2016

The purpose of payments made from the Section 1603 program were to reimburse grant recipients for a portion of the cost they incurred to install certain types of energy systems at business locations. Payments were made after the energy systems were installed.

== Qualifying energy systems ==
The types of energy systems that qualified for the program were biomass, combined heat and power, fuel cells, geothermal, incremental hydropower, landfill gas, marine hydrokinetic, microturbine, municipal solid waste, solar and wind.

== Funding and status ==
As of April 2016, the program funded 104,733 projects. Total cumulative funding for the program stood at $24.9 billion. (Note: To view a table of showing funding, number of projects, and capacity in megawatts state-by-state, visit page 4 of Treasury Department's Overview and Status Update of the §1603 Program.)

The Treasury Department no longer accepts applications. The program started in 2009 and ended in 2012. However, Congress has continued to investigate the program as recently as June 2016.

== Congressional oversight and issues ==
Primary oversight activity over the program has occurred at the Senate Finance Committee. On June 9, 2016, Chairman Senator Orrin Hatch requested from Department of Treasury, the Internal Revenue Service (IRS) and the Treasury Inspector General for Tax Administration (TIGTA) details about how companies use Section 1603 grants and tax credits. In March 2016, Hatch asked the IRS and Treasury Department to demonstrate that the agencies use safeguards and coordinate with each other when reviewing applications for Section 1603 grants.

In 2013, an investigation by TIGTA found that the IRS did not have a system to track the accounts of taxpayers receiving Section 1603 grants. As a consequence, grant recipients could amend back tax returns to claim a tax credit in addition to receiving the grant.
