= 2009 energy efficiency and renewable energy research investment =

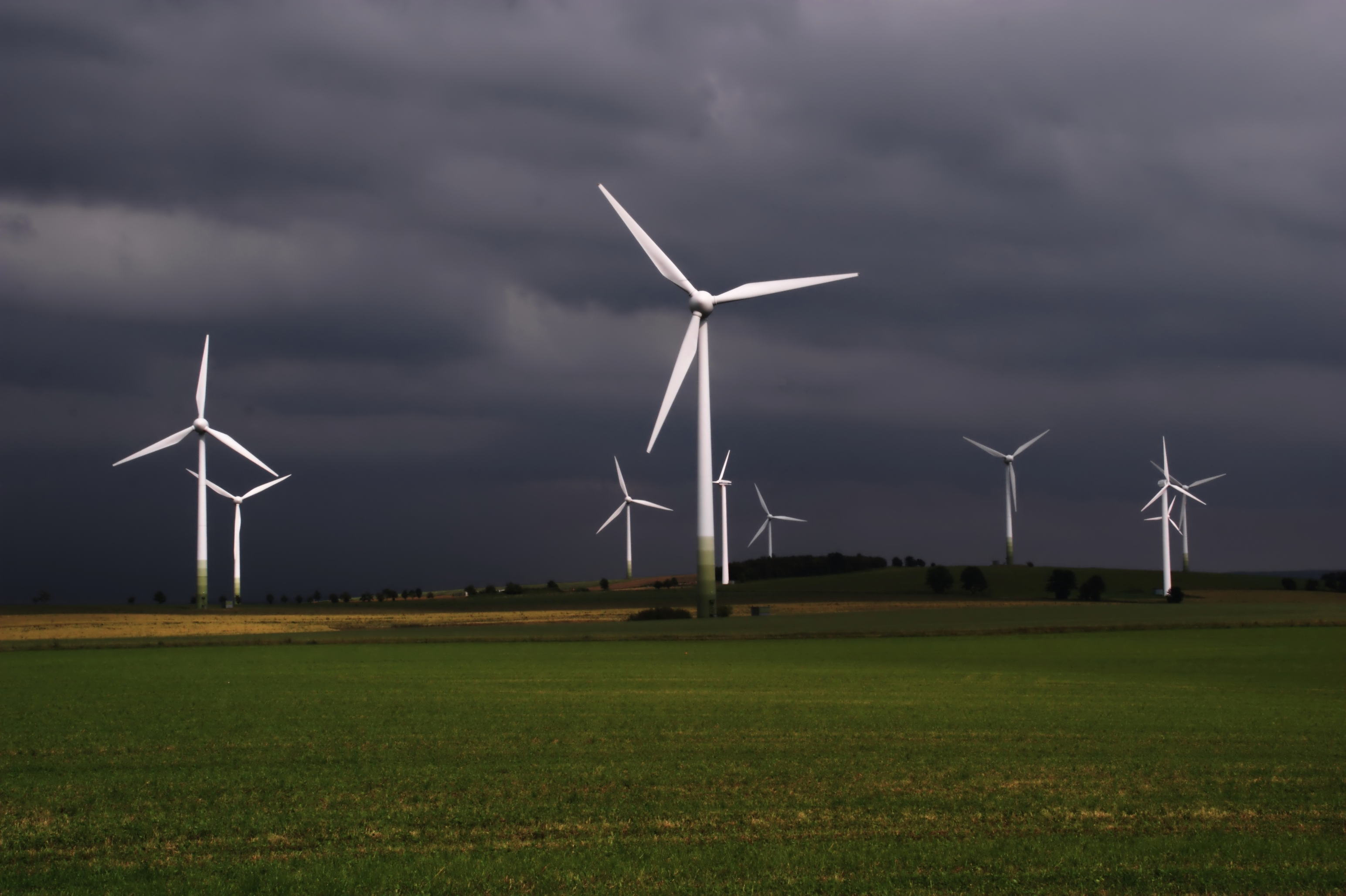
Wind energy received a large increase from federal funding.

The 2009 energy efficiency and renewable energy research investment was a part of the American Recovery and Reinvestment Act of 2009 and it increased federal funds in renewable energy. The package included $50 billion in spending and $20 billion in tax provisions. The research within the investment also increased; as a result $8.8 billion went into renewable energy research. The investment also included a boost for "green buildings". Federal buildings received $4.5 billion in renovations; public housing was also granted $4 billion in renovations. An additional $250 million was made out to energy-efficient affordable housing, in part by installing insulation. Environment America, an organization of state-based, environmental advocacy organizations, reviewed the final bill and stated there was $32.80 billion in funding for clean energy projects, $26.86 billion for energy efficiency initiatives and $18.95 billion for green transportation, totaling $78.61 billion just for "green" projects.

== Background ==
During his 2008 presidential campaign President Barack Obama stated to help and invest federal money into the green energy industry in the United States. President Obama stated that the plan would put 460,000 Americans to work on renewable energy projects and double the amount of renewable energy produced over the next three years. The plan provided funds to 2 million homes by improving things such as insulation problems. The government pledged to use federal funds to improve the efficiency of 75 percent of federal buildings.

== New green job market ==
President Obama made a plan that put 460,000 Americans to work on energy projects and doubled the amount of alternative energy produced over the next three years. The number of green energy jobs increased. In the short term, the plan would provide funds to improve 2 million homes by improving things such as insulation and leaky windows. The government also hired additional workers to improve the efficiency of 75 percent of federal buildings. $500 million was distributed as grants for training workers in their respected jobs markets. That sum includes $50 million for communities battered by job losses and restructuring the auto industry after the 2008 financial crisis. The energy, education and labor departments also started a partnership to help link the unemployed with jobs, training and education opportunities together.

== Capital requirements ==
The United States government’s need to have the capital market back up their initiatives was studied by University of Massachusetts Amherst economist Robert Pollin and was written in Nation magazine in February 2009. Bank, as he research stated, would be required to devote a percentage of loan portfolios to green investments in the next decade, he wrote, while larger tax credits could be provided to homes and businesses for installation of solar energy and other renewable energy. Funds from a cap-and-trade emissions program or a carbon tax could also be recycled back.

== Improvements to renewable energy programs ==
=== Wind energy ===
Wind farm developers had extended tax credits for every kilowatt hour of electricity they produce. Until now, the credit expired every year and investors were hesitant to put money into projects that could lose their favored tax status in a matter of months. The wind industry called for many of the swaps to the tax credits that the stimulus bill includes. That credit was extended for up to three years. The United States wind industry in 2008 installed about 42% of all the new electric generating space added that year and created 35,000 jobs, in construction and manufacturing. The renewable energy measures in the stimulus bill proposed to aid and sustain green energy as well as encourage additional clean energy job creation.

=== Solar energy ===
Solar energy developers were also included in the bill. The bill backed proposed statements in the stimulus package that would change the current system of tax credits for investing in the alternative energy project.

Since the recession has begun to effect the economy, many banks didn't have enough revenue and tax bills and weren't very interested in partnering to get tax credit. So the money to invest in alternative energy decreased significantly. In the stimulus package it shifted federal money directly to developers, in addition to keeping the original tax breaks for the renewable energy programs in America.

== Green buildings ==
Green building developers have to now get permits and rights-of-way to build lines across private property. The stimulus package doesn't address one big obstacle for green energy building, the cheap cost of burning coal. To make electricity renewable energy advocates are trying to persuade Congress to put a carbon price on carbon-heavy fossil fuels that contribute to global warming.
