= Cash for appliances program =

Governmental program in the United States

The State Energy-Efficient Appliance Rebate Program, more commonly called the "cash for appliances" program was a United States federal program to encourage homeowners to trade inefficient appliances for Energy Star certified replacements. It is frequently compared to the Car Allowance Rebate System (CARS), colloquially known as "Cash for Clunkers," which was a 2009 federal program to encourage replacing cars with low fuel efficiency. Just as the (CARS) relied upon the Environmental Protection Agency's fuel economy ratings to determine which new automobiles should be eligible for a cash incentive, this program relied upon EPA's Energy Star standards to identify new home appliances that were eligible for a cash incentive.

Backed by an initial $300 million in funding from the American Recovery and Reinvestment Act, the state-run rebate program was intended to help make American homes more energy-efficient while further stimulating the economy. The states had until October 15, 2009 to submit their applications for funding and plans for recycling old appliances to the Department of Energy (DOE). The DOE then started to distribute funds to the individual states. The DOE recommended that states consider the following Energy Star qualified appliances:

- Boilers
- Central air conditioners
- Clothes washers
- Dishwashers
- Freezers
- Furnaces (oil and gas)
- Heat pumps (air source and geothermal)
- Refrigerators
- Room air conditioners
- Water heaters.

Two early states to implement the program were Illinois, which received $12.4 million, and Iowa, which received $2.8 million.

The program was officially closed in all US states and territories on Friday, February 17, 2012.

== See also ==
- Energy conservation in the United States
