= Federalreporting.gov =

Federalreporting.gov is a website and system designed by CGI that helps recipients of American Recovery and Reinvestment Act of 2009 (ARRA or "The Act") funds satisfy the reporting requirements as identified by section 1511 of The Act.

The solution www.FederalReporting.gov is the web site that recipients will access in order to fulfill their reporting obligations as defined by Section 1512 of the Recovery Act and by this Guidance. The www.FederalReporting.gov solution will provide recipients and federal agencies with the ability to:

- Register for the site and manage their account(s)
- Submit reports
- View and comment on reports if the user represents a Federal agency or prime recipient
- Update or correct reports when appropriate

Recipients of Recovery Act funding can enter information into the system through the use of an online interface, uploading XML, or uploading an Excel Spreadsheet.

== History ==
Federalreporting.gov started in use in October 2009. It remains active, as of July 27, 2010.

== See also ==
- American Recovery and Reinvestment Act of 2009
