= American Recovery and Reinvestment Act of 2009 =

Stimulus package

- Long title: An Act making supplemental appropriations for job preservation and creation, infrastructure investment, energy efficiency and science, assistance to the unemployed, State, and local fiscal stabilization, for the fiscal year ending September 30, 2009, and for other purposes.
- Acronyms (colloquial): ARRA
- Nicknames: Recovery Act
- Enacted by: the 111th United States Congress
- Effective: February 17, 2009

Citations
- Public law: 111-5
- Statutes at Large: 123 Stat. 115

Codification
- Acts amended: Energy Policy Act of 2005; Energy Policy Act of 1992; Public Utility Regulatory Policies Act of 1978; Public Utility Holding Company Act of 1935
- Titles amended: 16 U.S.C.: Conservation; 42 U.S.C.: Public Health and Social Welfare
- U.S.C. sections amended: 16 U.S.C. ch. 46 § 2601 et seq. 42 U.S.C. ch. 134 § 13201 et seq. 42 U.S.C. ch. 149 § 15801 et seq.

Legislative history
- Introduced in the House as H.R. 1 by Dave Obey (D-WI) on January 26, 2009; Committee consideration by Appropriations and Budget; Passed the House on January 28, 2009 (244–188); Passed the Senate on February 10, 2009 (61–37); Reported by the joint conference committee on February 12, 2009; agreed to by the House on February 13, 2009 (246–183) and by the Senate on February 13, 2009 (60–38); Signed into law by President Barack Obama on February 17, 2009

Major amendments
- Tax Relief, Unemployment Insurance Reauthorization, and Job Creation Act of 2010

The American Recovery and Reinvestment Act of 2009 (ARRA) (Pub. L. 111–5 (text) (PDF)), nicknamed the Recovery Act, was a stimulus package enacted by the 111th U.S. Congress and signed into law by President Barack Obama in February 2009. Developed in response to the Great Recession, the primary objective of this federal statute was to save existing jobs and create new ones as soon as possible. Other objectives were to provide temporary relief programs for those most affected by the recession and invest in infrastructure, education, health, and renewable energy.

The approximate cost of the economic stimulus package was estimated to be $787 billion at the time of passage, later revised to $831 billion between 2009 and 2019. The ARRA's rationale was based on the Keynesian economic theory that, during recessions, the government should offset the decrease in private spending with an increase in public spending in order to save jobs and stop further economic deterioration.

The politics around the stimulus were very contentious, with Republicans criticizing the size of the stimulus. On the right, it spurred the Tea Party movement and may have contributed to Republicans winning the House in the 2010 midterm elections. Not a single Republican member of the House voted for the stimulus, and only three Republican senators voted for it. Most economists agree that the stimulus was smaller than needed, though surveys of economists show overwhelming agreement that the stimulus reduced unemployment, and that the benefits of the stimulus outweigh the cost.

== Legislative history ==
Both the House and the Senate versions of the bills were primarily written by Democratic congressional committee leaders and their staffs. Because work on the bills started before President Obama officially took office on January 20, 2009, top aides to President-Elect Obama held multiple meetings with committee leaders and staffers. On January 10, 2009, President-Elect Obama's administration released a report that provided a preliminary analysis of the impact to jobs of some of the prototypical recovery packages that were being considered.

=== House of Representatives assembly ===
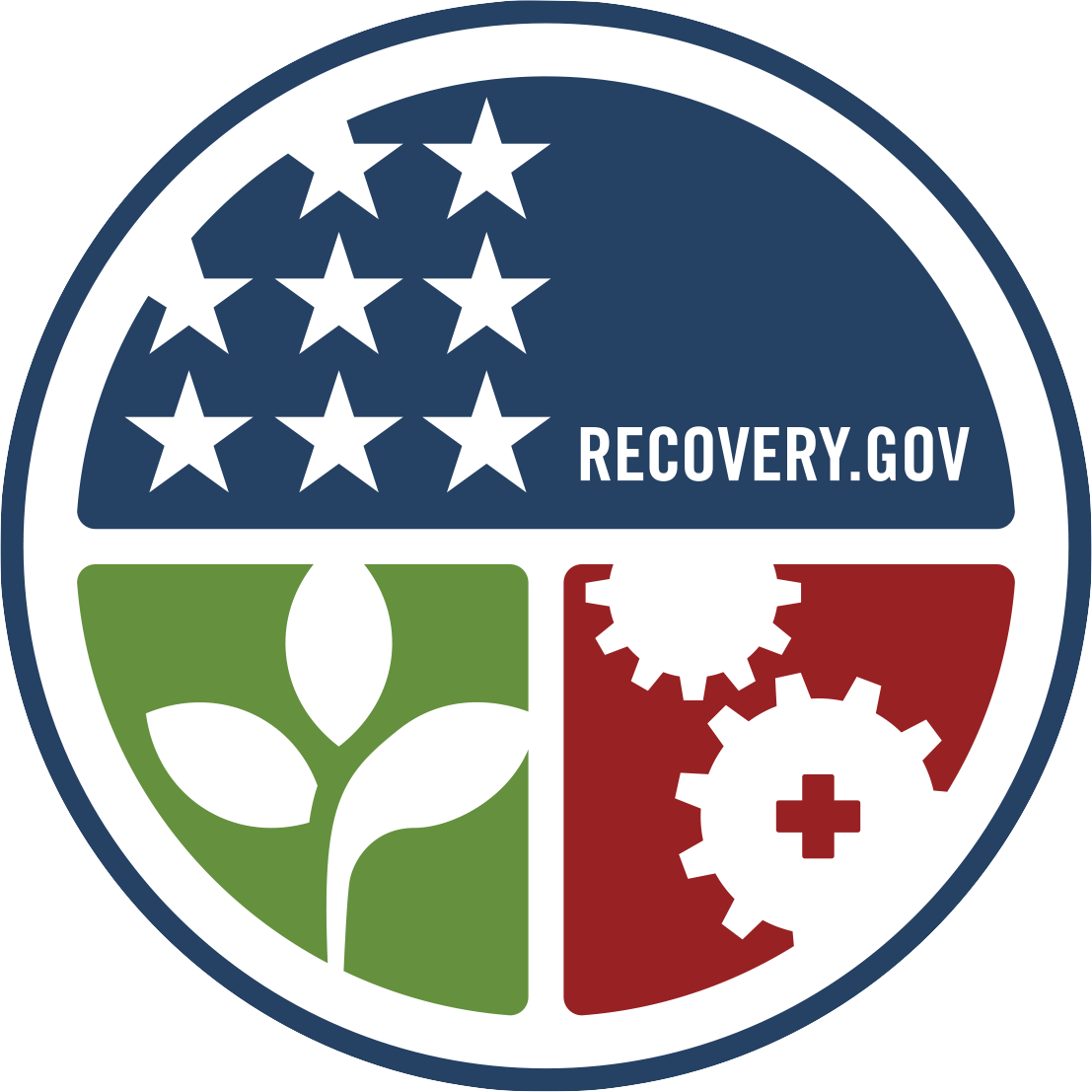
Official seal of Recovery.gov, the official site of the American Recovery and Reinvestment Act of 2009

The House version of the bill, H.R. 1, was introduced on January 26, 2009 by Dave Obey, the chairman of the House Committee on Appropriations, and was co-sponsored by nine other Democrats. On January 23, Speaker of the House Nancy Pelosi said that the bill was on track to be presented to President Obama for him to sign into law before February 16, 2009. Although 206 amendments were scheduled for floor votes, they were combined into only 11, which enabled quicker passage of the bill.

On January 28, 2009, the House passed the bill by a 244–188 vote. All but 11 Democrats voted for the bill, but not a single Republican voted in favor: 177 Republicans voted against it, while one Republican (Ginny Brown-Waite) did not vote.

=== Senate ===
The Senate version of the bill, S. 1, was introduced on January 6, 2009, and later substituted as an amendment to the House bill, SA 570. It was sponsored by Harry Reid, the Majority Leader, co-sponsored by 16 other Democrats and Joe Lieberman, an independent who caucused with the Democrats.

The Senate then began consideration of the bill starting with the $275 billion tax provisions in the week of February 2, 2009. A significant difference between the House version and the Senate version was the inclusion of a one-year extension of revisions to the alternative minimum tax, which added $70 billion to the bill's total.

Republicans proposed several amendments to the bill directed at increasing the share of tax cuts and downsizing spending as well as decreasing the overall price. President Obama and Senate Democrats hinted that they would be willing to compromise on Republican suggestions to increase infrastructure spending and to double the housing tax credit proposed from $7,500 to $15,000 and expand its application to all home buyers, not just first-time buyers. Other considered amendments included the Freedom Act of 2009, an amendment proposed by Senate Finance Committee members Maria Cantwell (D) and Orrin Hatch (R) to include tax incentives for plug-in electric vehicles.

The Senate called a special Saturday debate session for February 7 at the urging of President Obama. The Senate voted, 61–36 (with 2 not voting) on February 9 to end debate on the bill and advance it to the Senate floor to vote on the bill itself. On February 10, the Senate voted 61–37 (with one not voting) All the Democrats voted in favor, but only three Republicans voted in favor (Susan Collins, Olympia Snowe, and Arlen Specter). Specter switched to the Democratic Party later in the year. At one point, the Senate bill stood at $838 billion.

=== Comparison of the House, Senate and Conference versions ===
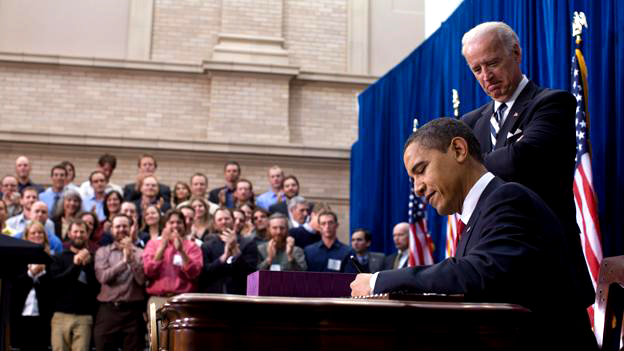
President Barack Obama signs the ARRA into law on February 17, 2009, in Denver, Colorado. Vice President Joe Biden stands behind him.

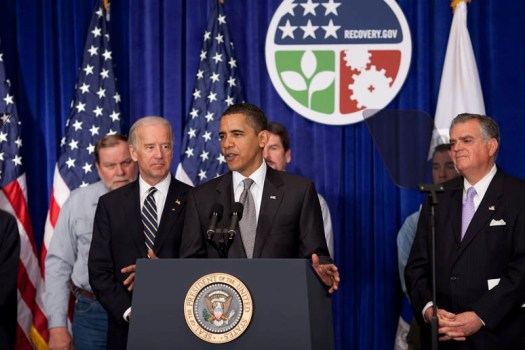
President Barack Obama speaks about the 2,000th project approved through the ARRA. The president is joined by Vice President Joe Biden and Secretary of Transportation Ray LaHood.

Senate Republicans forced a near unprecedented level of changes (near $150 billion) in the House bill, which had more closely followed the Obama plan. A comparison of the $827 billion economic recovery plan drafted by Senate Democrats with an $820 billion version passed by the House and the final $787 billion conference version shows huge shifts within these similar totals. Additional debt costs would add about $350 billion or more over 10 years. Many provisions were set to expire in two years.

The main funding differences between the Senate bill and the House bill were: More funds for health care in the Senate ($153.3 vs $140 billion), renewable energy programs ($74 vs. $39.4 billion), for home buyers tax credit ($35.5 vs. $2.6 billion), new payments to the elderly and a one-year increase in AMT limits. The House had more funds appropriated for education ($143 vs. $119.1 billion), infrastructure ($90.4 vs. $62 billion) and for aid to low income workers and the unemployed ($71.5 vs. $66.5 billion).

==== Spending (Senate – $552 billion, House – $545 billion) ====
Address Before a Joint Session of Congress (February 24, 2009) (52:20)
Barack Obama's February 24, 2009 Address Before a Joint Session of Congress. The American Recovery and Reinvestment Act of 2009 was a focal point of the speech.

Address Before a Joint Session of Congress (February 24, 2009) (audio)
Audio-only version

- Aid to low-income workers and the unemployed
  - Senate – $47 billion to provide extended unemployment benefits through December 31, increased by $25 a week, and provide job training; $16.5 billion to increase food stamp benefits by 12 percent through fiscal 2011 and issue a one-time bonus payment; $3 billion in temporary welfare payments.
  - House – Comparable extension of unemployment insurance; $20 billion to increase food stamp benefits by 14 percent; $2.5 billion in temporary welfare payments; $1 billion for home heating subsidies and $1 billion for community action agencies.
- Direct cash payments
  - Senate – $17 billion to give one-time $300 payments to recipients of Supplemental Security Income and Social Security, and veterans receiving disability and pensions.
  - House – $4 billion to provide a one-time additional Supplemental Security Income and Social Security Disability Insurance payment to the elderly, of $450 for individuals and $630 for married couples.
  - Conference – $250 one-time payment to each recipient of Supplemental Security Income, Social Security (Regular & Disability) Insurance, Veterans pension, Railroad Retirement, or State retirement system
- Infrastructure
  - Senate – $46 billion for transportation projects, including $27 billion for highway and bridge construction and repair and $11.5 billion for mass transit and rail projects; $4.6 billion for the Army Corps of Engineers; $5 billion for public housing improvements; $6.4 billion for clean and drinking water projects.
  - House – $47 billion for transportation projects, including $27 billion for highway and bridge construction and repair and $12 billion for mass transit, including $7.5 billion to buy transit equipment such as buses; and $31 billion to build and repair federal buildings and other public infrastructures.
- Health care
  - Senate – $21 billion to subsidize the cost of continuing health care insurance for the involuntarily unemployed under the COBRA program; $87 billion to help states with Medicaid; $22 billion to modernize health information technology systems; and $10 billion for health research and construction of National Institutes of Health facilities.
  - House – $40 billion to subsidize the cost of continuing health care insurance for the involuntarily unemployed under the COBRA program or provide health care through Medicaid; $87 billion to help states with Medicaid; $20 billion to modernize health information technology systems; $4 billion for preventive care; $1.5 billion for community health centers; $420 million to combat avian flu; $335 million for programs that combat AIDS, sexually transmitted diseases and tuberculosis.
  - Conference – A 65% COBRA subsidy for 9 months will apply to workers laid off between Sep 1, 2008 and Dec 31, 2009. Those already laid off have 60 days to apply for COBRA.
- Education
  - Senate – $55 billion in state fiscal relief to prevent cuts in education aid and provide block grants; $25 billion to school districts to fund special education and the No Child Left Behind K–12 law; $14 billion to boost the maximum Pell Grant by $400 to $5,250; $2 billion for Head Start.
  - House – Similar aid to states and school districts; $21 billion for school modernization; $16 billion to boost the maximum Pell Grant by $500 to $5,350; $2 billion for Head Start.
  - Conference – The Conference Report merged most education aid with the State Fiscal Stabilization fund (administered by the Department of Education) and gave power over the funds to each governor under voluminous restrictions. The Governor is "Required" to spend $45 billion of the money on education to restore funding to 2008 levels but the mechanisms to enforce state maintenance of effort at 2005–06 levels are complex and potentially impossible to implement. Hard hit states such as Nevada cannot possibly find enough funds to get to the 2005–06 state funding levels for education. Some states with no current budget cuts for education, such as Arkansas and North Carolina, may get nothing. This will result in a monumental 50 state legal and political fight over how to re-budget to best take advantage of the federal legislation. Many states will further reduce state funds for education to the 2005–06 minimum so these state resources can be used for other state priorities and the net gain for education will be far less than the total federal appropriation.
- Energy
  - Senate – $40 billion for energy efficiency and renewable energy programs, including $2.9 billion to weatherize modest-income homes; $4.6 billion for fossil fuel research and development; $6.4 billion to clean up nuclear weapons production sites; $11 billion toward a smart electricity grid to reduce waste; $8.5 billion to subsidize loans for renewable energy projects; and $2 billion for advanced battery systems.
  - House – $28.4 billion for energy efficiency and renewable energy programs, including $6.2 billion to weatherize homes; $11 billion to fund a smart electricity grid.
- Homeland security
  - Senate – $4.7 billion for homeland security programs, including $1 billion for airport screening equipment and $800 million for port security.
  - House – $1.1 billion, including $500 million for airport screening equipment.
- Law enforcement
  - Senate – $3.5 billion in grants to state and local law enforcement to hire officers and purchase equipment.
  - House – Comparable provision.

==== Tax changes ($275 billion) ====
  - House – About $145 billion for $500 per-worker, $1,000 per-couple tax credits in 2009 and 2010. For the last half of 2009, workers could expect to see about $20 a week less withheld from their paychecks starting around June. Millions of Americans who do not make enough money to pay federal income taxes could file returns next year and receive checks. Individuals making more than $75,000 and couples making more than $150,000 would receive reduced amounts.
  - Senate – The credit would phase out at incomes of $70,000 for individuals and couples making more than $140,000 and phase out more quickly, reducing the cost to $140 billion.
  - Conference – Tax Credit reduced to $400 per worker and $800 per couple in 2009 and 2010 and phaseout begins at $75,000 for individuals and $150,000 for joint filers. Note retirees with no wages get nothing.
- Alternative minimum tax
  - House – No provision.
  - Senate – About $70 billion to prevent 24 million taxpayers from paying the alternative minimum tax in 2009. The tax was designed to make sure wealthy taxpayers cannot use credits and deductions to avoid paying any taxes or paying at a far lower rate than would otherwise be possible. But it was never indexed to inflation, so critics now contend it taxes people it was not intended to. Congress addresses it each year, usually in the fall.
  - Conference – Includes a one-year increase in AMT floor to $70,950 for joint filers for 2009.
- Expanded child credit
  - House – $18.3 billion to give greater access to the $1,000 per-child tax credit for low income workers in 2009 and 2010. Under current law, workers must make at least $12,550 to receive any portion of the credit. The change eliminates the floor, meaning more workers who pay no federal income taxes could receive checks.
  - Senate – Sets a new income threshold of $8,100 to receive any portion of the credit, reducing the cost to $7.5 billion.
  - Conference – The income floor for refunds was set at $3,000 for 2009 & 2010.
- Expanded earned income tax credit
  - House – $4.7 billion to increase the earned income tax credit – which provides money to low income workers – for families with at least three children.
  - Senate – Same.
- Expanded college credit
  - House – $13.7 billion to provide a $2,500 expanded tax credit for college tuition and related expenses for 2009 and 2010. The credit is phased out for couples making more than $160,000.
  - Senate – Reduces the amount that can be refunded to low-income families that pay no income taxes, lowering the cost to $13 billion.
- Homebuyer credit
  - House – $2.6 billion to repeal a requirement that a $7,500 first-time homebuyer tax credit be paid back over time for homes purchased from Jan 1 to July 1, unless the home is sold within three years. The credit is phased out for couples making more than $150,000.
  - Senate – Doubles the credit to $15,000 for homes purchased for a year after the bill takes effect, increasing the cost to $35.5 billion.
  - Conference – $8,000 credit for all homes bought between 1/1/2009 and 12/1/2009 and repayment provision repealed for homes purchased in 2009 and held more than three years.
- Home energy credit
  - House – $4.3 billion to provide an expanded credit to homeowners who make their homes more energy-efficient in 2009 and 2010. Homeowners could recoup 30 percent of the cost up to $1,500 of numerous projects, such as installing energy-efficient windows, doors, furnaces and air conditioners.
  - Senate – Same.
  - Conference – Same.
- Unemployment
  - House – No similar provision.
  - Senate – $4.7 billion to exclude from taxation the first $2,400 a person receives in unemployment compensation benefits in 2009.
  - Conference – Same as Senate
- Bonus depreciation
  - House – $5 billion to extend a provision allowing businesses buying equipment such as computers to speed up its depreciation through 2009.
  - Senate – Similar.
- Money-losing companies
  - House – $15 billion to allow companies to use current losses to offset profits made in the previous five years, instead of two, making them eligible for tax refunds.
  - Senate – Allows companies to use more of their losses to offset previous profits, increasing the cost to $19.5 billion.
  - Conference – Limits the carry-back to small companies, revenue under $5 million
- Government contractors
  - House – Repeal a law that takes effect in 2011, requiring government agencies to withhold three percent of payments to contractors to help ensure they pay their tax bills. Repealing the law would cost $11 billion over 10 years, in part because the government could not earn interest by holding the money throughout the year.
  - Senate – Delays the law from taking effect until 2012, reducing the cost to $291 million.
- Energy production
  - House – $13 billion to extend tax credits for renewable energy production.
  - Senate – Same.
  - Conference – Extension is to 2014.
- Repeal bank credit
  - House – Repeal a Treasury provision that allowed firms that buy money-losing banks to use more of the losses as tax credits to offset the profits of the merged banks for tax purposes. The change would increase taxes on the merged banks by $7 billion over 10 years.
  - Senate – Same.
  - House – $36 billion to subsidize locally issued bonds for school construction, teacher training, economic development and infrastructure improvements.
  - Senate – $22.8 billion to subsidize locally issued bonds for school construction, industrial development and infrastructure improvements.
- Auto sales
  - House – No similar provision.
  - Senate – $11 billion to make interest payments on most auto loans and sales tax on cars deductible.
  - Conference – $2 billion for deduction of sales tax, not interest payments phased out for incomes above $250,000.

=== Conference report ===
Congressional negotiators said that they had completed the Conference Report on February 11. On February 12, House Majority Leader Steny Hoyer scheduled the vote on the bill for the next day, before wording on the bill's content had been completed and despite House Democrats having previously promised to allow a 48-hour public review period before any vote. The Report with final handwritten provisions was posted on a House website that evening. On February 13, the Report passed the House, 246–183, largely along party lines with all 246 Yes votes given by Democrats and the Nay vote split between 176 Republicans and 7 Democrats.

The Senate passed the bill, 60–38, with all Democrats and Independents voting for the bill along with three Republicans. On February 17, 2009, President Barack Obama signed the Recovery Act into law.

== Provisions of the act ==
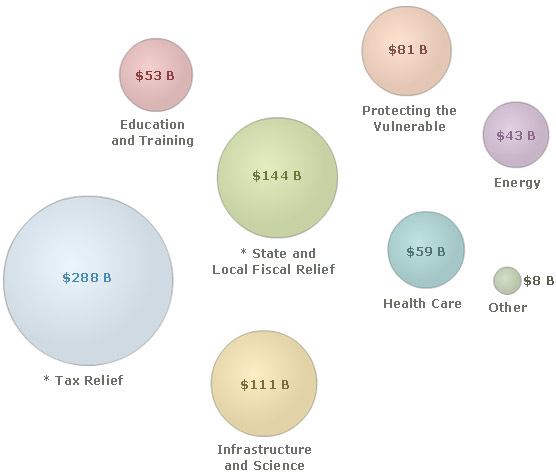
Composition of the act: Tax incentives – Includes $15 B for Infrastructure and Science, $61 B for Protecting the Vulnerable, $25 B for Education and Training and $22 B for Energy, so total funds are $126 B for Infrastructure and Science, $142 B for Protecting the Vulnerable, $78 B for Education and Training, and $65 B for Energy. State and Local Fiscal Relief – Prevents state and local cuts to health and education programs and state and local tax increases.

Section 3 of the ARRA listed the basic intent behind crafting the law. This Statement of Purpose included the following:

1. To preserve and create jobs and promote economic recovery.
2. To assist those most impacted by the recession.
3. To provide investments needed to increase economic efficiency by spurring technological advances in science and health.
4. To invest in transportation, environmental protection, and other infrastructure that will provide long-term economic benefits.
5. To stabilize State and local government budgets, in order to minimize and avoid reductions in essential services and counterproductive state and local tax increases.

The act specifies that 37% of the package is to be devoted to tax incentives equaling $288 billion and $144 billion, or 18%, is allocated to state and local fiscal relief (more than 90% of the state aid is going to Medicaid and education). The remaining 45%, or $357 billion, is allocated to federal spending programs such as transportation, communication, wastewater, and sewer infrastructure improvements; energy efficiency upgrades in private and federal buildings; extension of federal unemployment benefits; and scientific research programs. The following are details to the different parts of the final bill and the selected citizen to receive this Government Grants have to come up with $350 for the activation and they must clear the state tax according to the state percentage that will be refund it back along with the Grants.:

=== Tax incentives for individuals ===
Total: $237 billion

- $116 billion: New payroll tax credit of $400 per worker and $800 per couple in 2009 and 2010. Phaseout begins at $75,000 for individuals and $150,000 for joint filers.
- $70 billion: Alternative minimum tax: a one-year increase in AMT floor to $70,950 for joint filers for 2009.
- $15 billion: Expansion of child tax credit: A $1,000 credit to more families (even those that do not make enough money to pay income taxes).
- $14 billion: Expanded college credit to provide a $2,500 expanded tax credit for college tuition and related expenses for 2009 and 2010. The credit is phased out for couples making more than $160,000.
- $6.6 billion: Homebuyer credit: $8,000 refundable credit for all homes bought between January 1, 2009, and December 1, 2009, and repayment provision repealed for homes purchased in 2009 and held more than three years. This only applies to first-time homebuyers.
- $4.7 billion: Excluding from taxation the first $2,400 a person receives in unemployment compensation benefits in 2009.
- $4.7 billion: Expanded earned income tax credit to increase the earned income tax credit – which provides money to low income workers – for families with at least three children.
- $4.3 billion: Home energy credit to provide an expanded credit to homeowners who make their homes more energy-efficient in 2009 and 2010. Homeowners could recoup 30 percent of the cost up to $1,500 of numerous projects, such as installing energy-efficient windows, doors, furnaces and air conditioners.
- $1.7 billion: for deduction of sales tax from car purchases, not interest payments phased out for incomes above $250,000.

=== Tax incentives for companies ===
Total: $51 billion

- $15 billion: Allowing companies to use current losses to offset profits made in the previous five years, instead of two, making them eligible for tax refunds.
- $13 billion: to extend tax credits for renewable energy production (until 2014).
- $11 billion: Government contractors: Repeal a law that takes effect in 2012, requiring government agencies to withhold three percent of payments to contractors to help ensure they pay their tax bills. Repealing the law would cost $11 billion over 10 years, in part because the government could not earn interest by holding the money throughout the year.
- $7 billion: Repeal bank credit: Repeal a Treasury provision that allowed firms that buy money-losing banks to use more of the losses as tax credits to offset the profits of the merged banks for tax purposes. The change would increase taxes on the merged banks by $7 billion over 10 years.
- $5 billion: Bonus depreciation, which extends a provision allowing businesses buying equipment such as computers to speed up its depreciation through 2009.

=== Healthcare ===
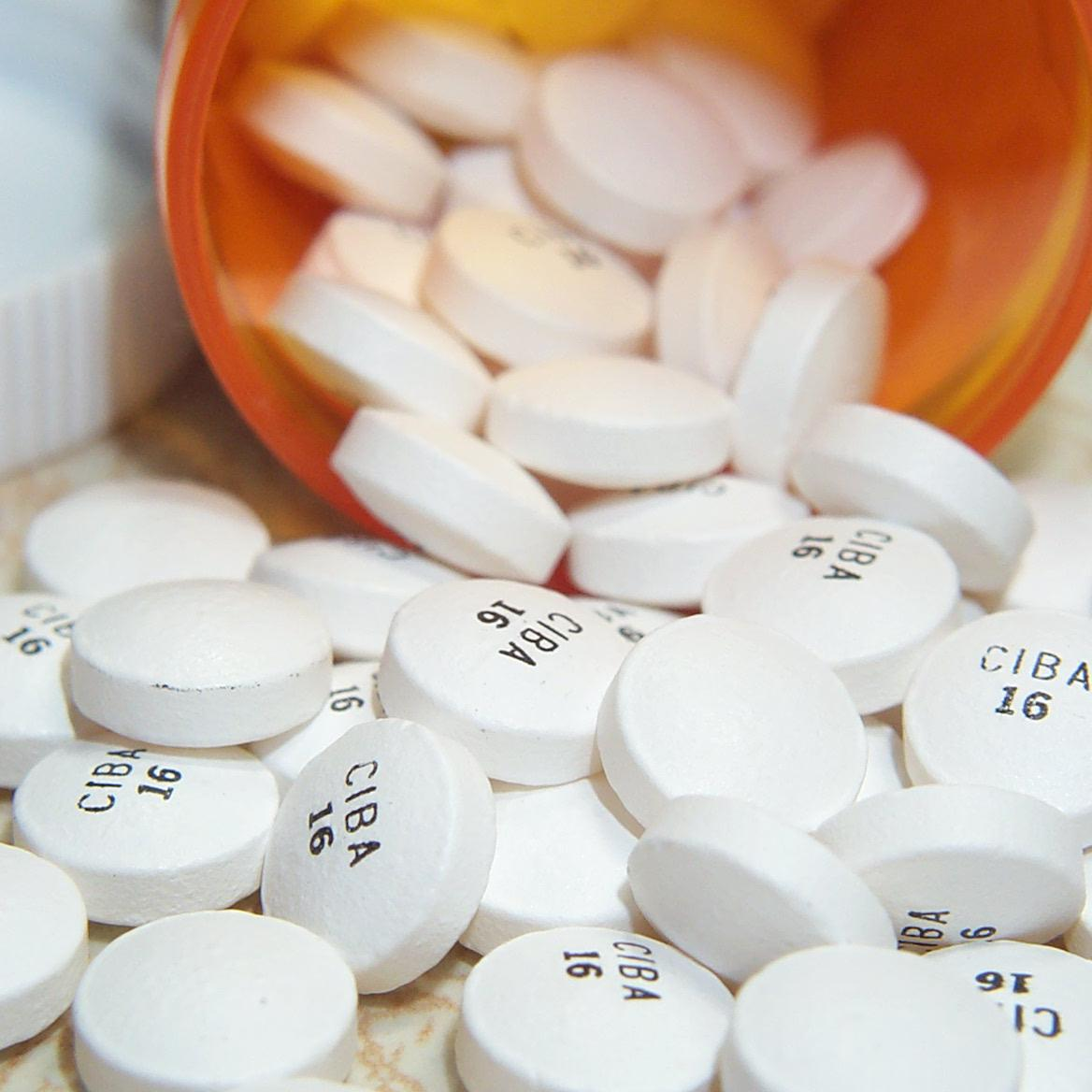
More than 11% of the total bill is allocated to help states with Medicaid.

ARRA included the enactment of the Health Information Technology for Economic and Clinical Health Act, also known as the HITECH Act.

Total health care spending: $155.1 billion

- $86.8 billion for Medicaid
- $25.8 billion for health information technology investments and incentive payments
- $25.1 billion to provide a 65% subsidy of health care insurance premiums for the unemployed under the COBRA program
- $10 billion for health research and construction of National Institutes of Health facilities
- $2 billion for Community Health Centers
- $1.3 billion for construction of military hospitals
- $1.1 billion to study the comparative effectiveness of healthcare treatments
- $1 billion for prevention and wellness
- $1 billion for the Veterans Health Administration
- $500 million for healthcare services on Indian reservations
- $300 million to train healthcare workers in the National Health Service Corps
- $202 million for a temporary moratorium for certain Medicare regulations

=== Education ===
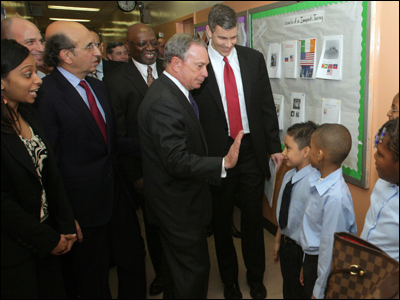
Secretary of Education Arne Duncan and New York City Mayor Michael Bloomberg visit with students at Explore Charter School

Total: $100 billion

- $53.6 billion in aid to local school districts to prevent layoffs and cutbacks, with flexibility to use the funds for school modernization and repair (State Fiscal Stabilization Fund)
- $15.6 billion to increase Pell Grants from $4,731 to $5,350
- $13 billion for low-income public schoolchildren
- $12.2 billion for IDEA special education
- $2.1 billion for Head Start
- $2 billion for childcare services
- $650 million for educational technology
- $300 million for increased teacher salaries
- $250 million for states to analyze student performance
- $200 million to support working college students
- $70 million for the education of homeless children

=== Aid to low income workers, unemployed and retirees (including job training) ===
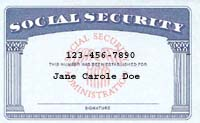
Payments to Social Security recipients and people on Supplemental Security Income were parts of the ARRA.

Total: $82.2 billion

- $40 billion to provide extended unemployment benefits through December 31, and increase them by $25 a week
- $19.9 billion for the Food Stamp Program
- $14.2 billion to give one-time $250 payments to Social Security recipients, people on Supplemental Security Income, and veterans receiving disability and pensions.
- $3.45 billion for job training
- $3.2 billion in temporary welfare payments (TANF and WIC)
- $500 million for vocational training for the disabled
- $400 million for employment services
- $120 million for subsidized community service jobs for older Americans
- $150 million to help refill food banks
- $100 million for meals programs for seniors, such as Meals on Wheels
- $100 million for free school lunch programs

=== Infrastructure investment ===
Total: $105.3 billion

==== Transportation ====
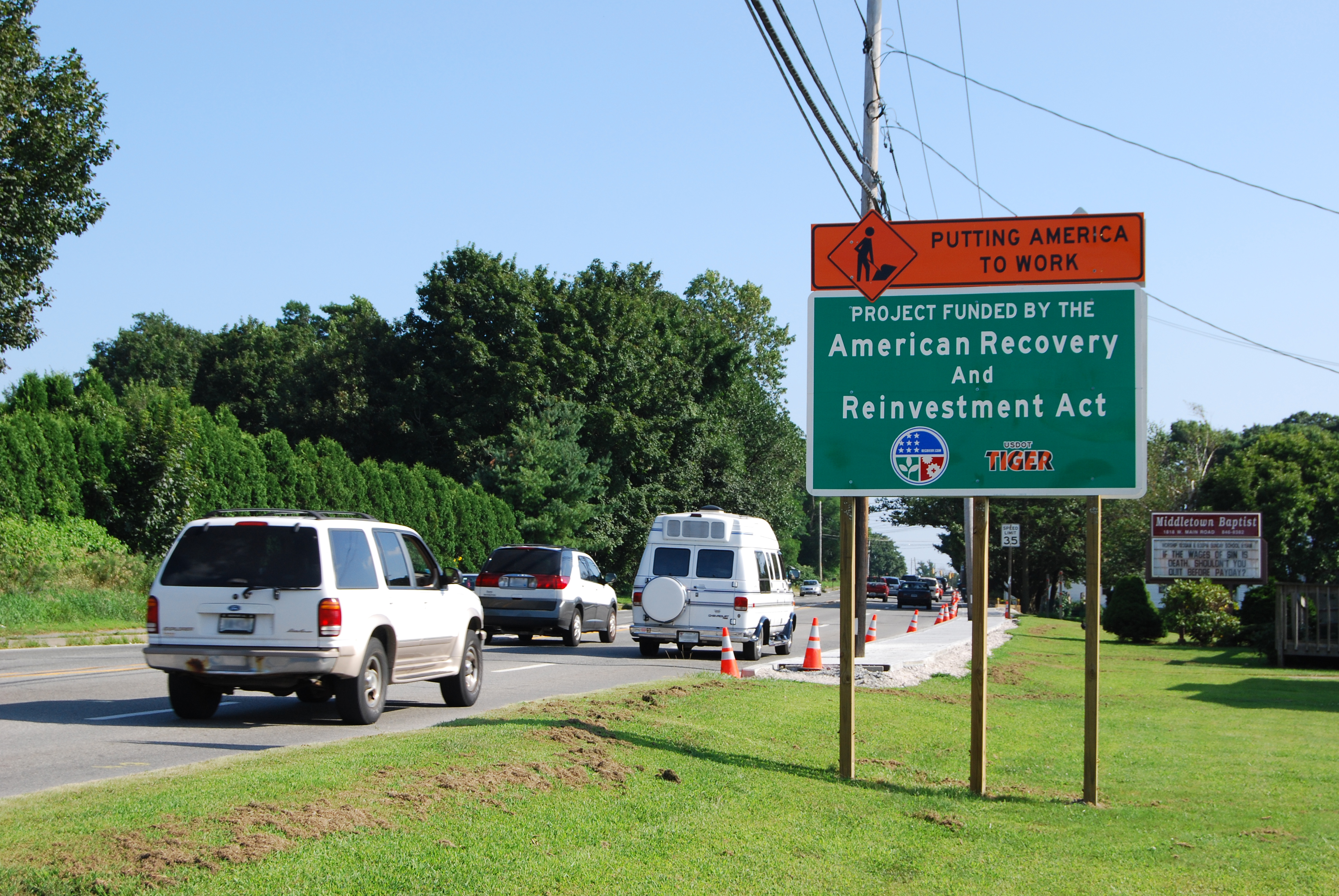
Road and highway construction is the biggest single line infrastructure item in the final bill. Projects funded by the ARRA have a sign marking them, like this one in Middletown, Rhode Island.

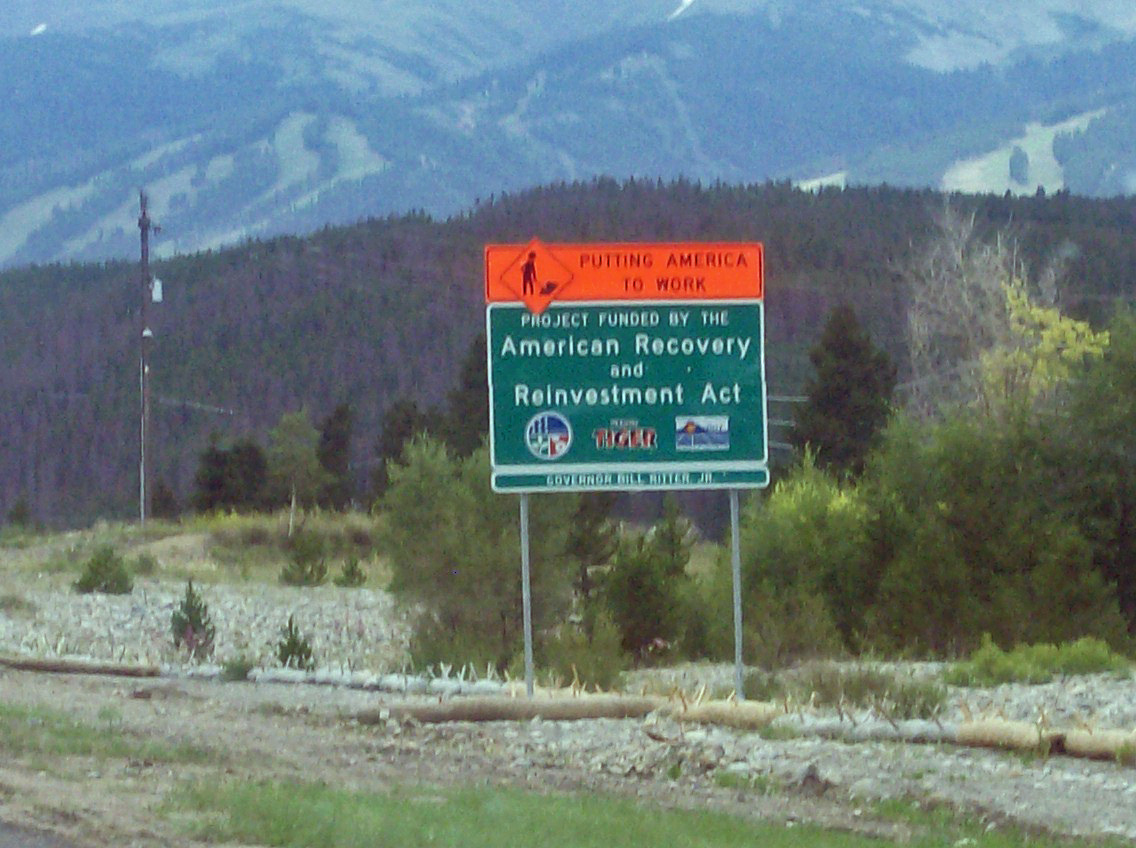
Sign for an ARRA funded road-widening project on State Highway 9 north of Breckenridge, Colorado

Total: $48.1 billion, some in the form of Transportation Investment Generating Economic Recovery (TIGER) Grants

- $27.5 billion for highway and bridge construction projects
- $8 billion for intercity passenger rail projects and rail congestion grants, with priority for high-speed rail
- $6.9 billion for new equipment for public transportation projects (Federal Transit Administration)
- $1.5 billion for national surface transportation discretionary grants
- $1.3 billion for Amtrak
- $1.1 billion in grants for airport improvements
- $750 million for the construction of new public rail transportation systems and other fixed guideway systems.
- $750 million for the maintenance of existing public transportation systems
- $200 million for FAA upgrades to air traffic control centers and towers, facilities, and equipment
- $100 million in grants for improvements to domestic shipyards

==== Water, sewage, environment, and public lands ====
Total: $18 billion

- $4.6 billion for the Army Corps of Engineers for environmental restoration, flood protection, hydropower, and navigation infrastructure projects
- $4 billion for the Clean Water State Revolving Fund wastewater treatment infrastructure improvements (EPA)
- $2 billion for the Drinking Water State Revolving Fund drinking water infrastructure improvements (EPA)
- $1.38 billion for rural drinking water and waste disposal projects
- $1 billion to the Bureau of Reclamation for drinking water projects for rural or drought-likely areas
- $750 million to the National Park Service
- $650 million to the Forest Service
- $600 million for hazardous waste cleanup at Superfund sites (EPA)
- $515 million for wildfire prevention projects
- $500 million for Bureau of Indian Affairs infrastructure projects
- $340 million to the Natural Resources Conservation Service for watershed infrastructure projects
- $320 million to the Bureau of Land Management
- $300 million for reductions in emissions from diesel engines (EPA)
- $300 million to improve Land Ports of Entry (GSA)
- $280 million for National Wildlife Refuges and the National Fish Hatchery System
- $220 million to the International Boundary and Water Commission to repair flood control systems along the Rio Grande
- $200 million for cleanup of leaking underground storage tanks (EPA)
- $100 million for cleaning former industrial and commercial sites (Brownfields) (EPA)

==== Government buildings and facilities ====
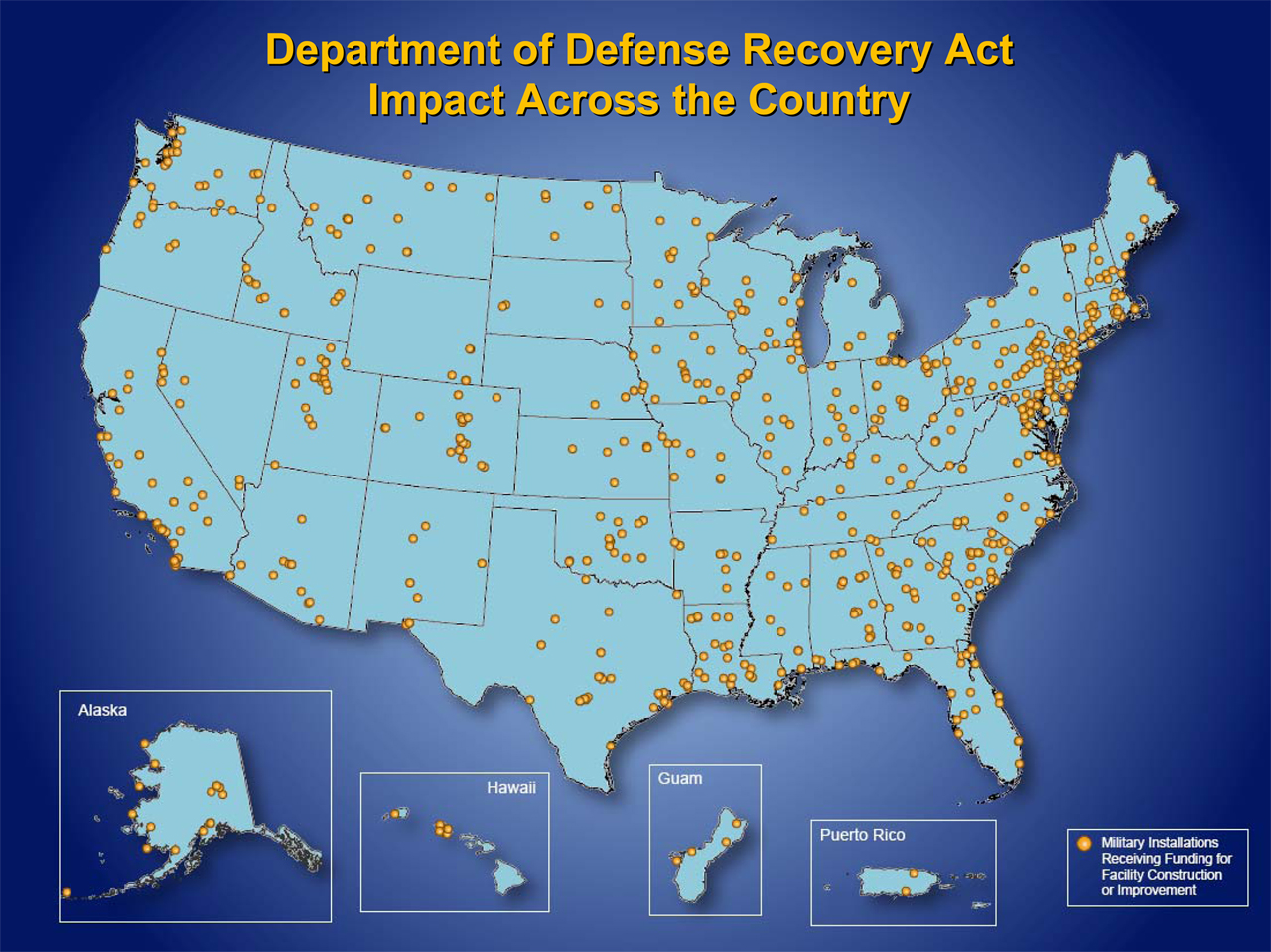
Impact of the ARRA on Department of Defense facilities across the nation

Total: $7.2 billion

- $4.2 billion to repair and modernize Defense Department facilities.
- $890 million to improve housing for service members
- $750 million for federal buildings and U.S. Courthouses (GSA)
- $250 million to improve Job Corps training facilities
- $240 million for new child development centers
- $240 million for the maintenance of United States Coast Guard facilities
- $200 million for Department of Homeland Security headquarters
- $176 million for Agriculture Research Service repairs and improvements
- $150 million for the construction of state extended-care facilities
- $100 million to improve facilities of the National Guard

==== Communications, information, and security technologies ====
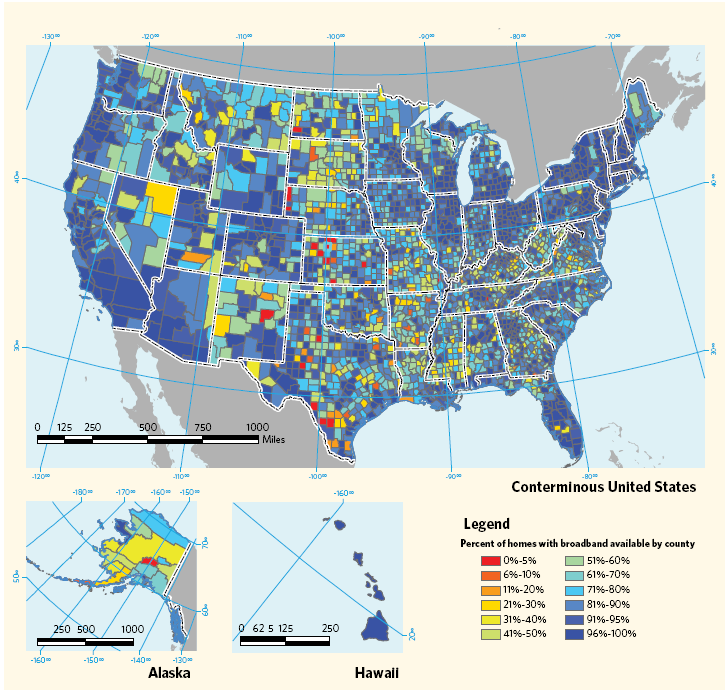
Federal Communications Commission (FCC) map showing the availability of broadband internet access in the U.S.

Total: $10.5 billion

- $7.2 billion for complete broadband and wireless Internet access
- $1 billion for explosive detection systems for airports
- $500 million to update the computer center at the Social Security Administration
- $420 million for construction and repairs at ports of entry
- $290 million to upgrade IT platforms at the State Department
- $280 million to upgrade border security technologies
- $210 million to build and upgrade fire stations
- $200 million for IT and claims processing improvements for Veterans Benefits Administration
- $150 million to upgrade port security
- $150 million for the security of transit systems
- $50 million for IT improvements at the Farm Service Agency
- $26 million to improve security systems at the Department of Agriculture headquarters

==== Energy infrastructure ====
Total: $21.5 billion

- $6 billion for the cleanup of radioactive waste (mostly nuclear weapons production sites)
- $4.5 billion for the Office of Electricity and Energy Reliability to modernize the nation's electrical grid and smart grid.
- $4.5 billion to increase energy efficiency in federal buildings (GSA)
- $3.25 billion for the Western Area Power Administration for power transmission system upgrades.
- $3.25 billion for the Bonneville Power Administration for power transmission system upgrades.

=== Energy efficiency and renewable energy research and investment ===
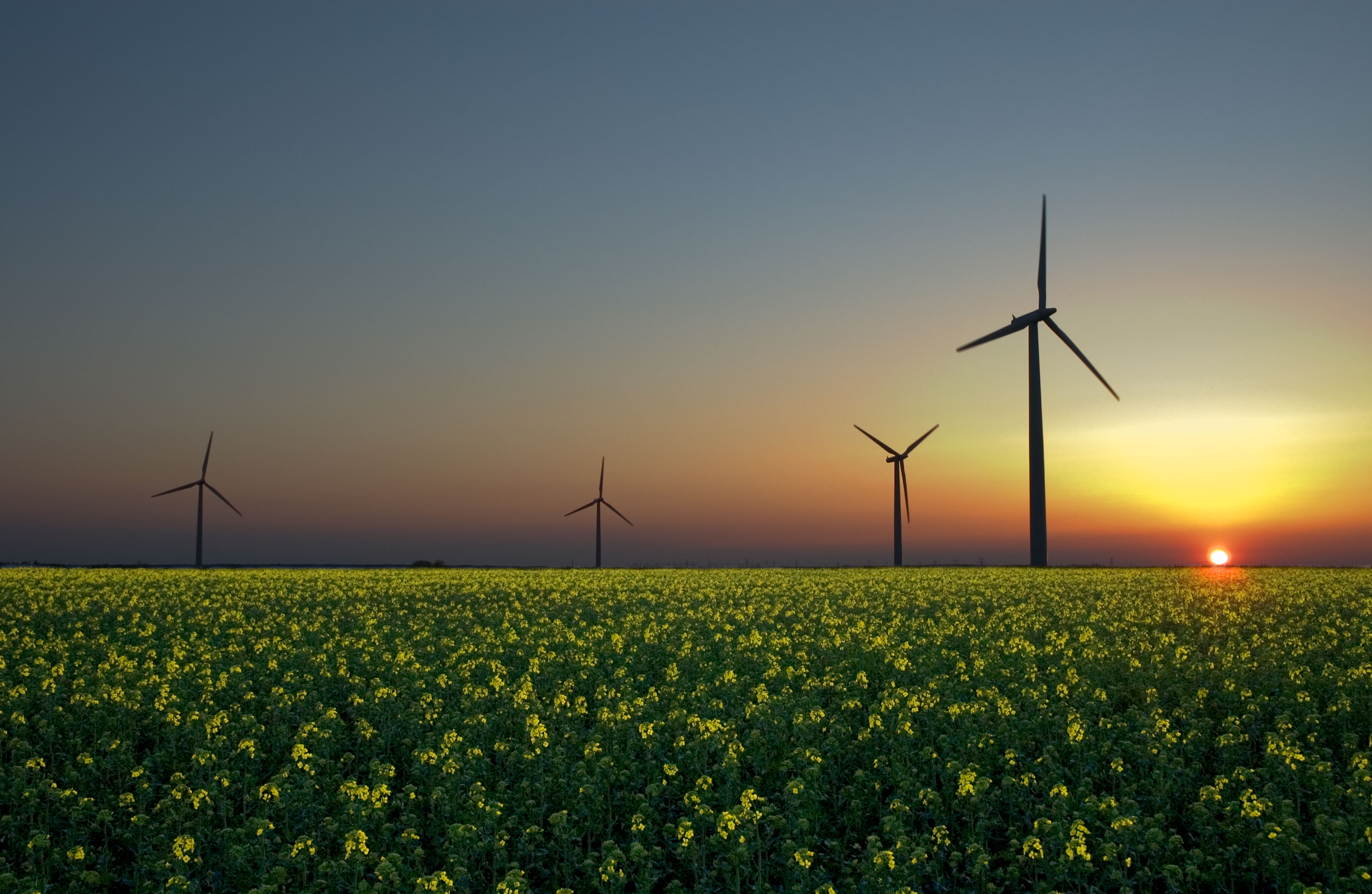
Loans and investments into green energy technology are a significant part of the final bill.

Total: $27.2 billion

- $6 billion for renewable energy and electric transmission technologies loan guarantees
- $5 billion for weatherizing modest-income homes
- $3.4 billion for carbon capture and low emission coal research
- $3.2 billion toward Energy Efficiency and Conservation Block Grants.
- $3.1 billion for the State Energy Program to help states invest in energy efficiency and renewable energy
- $2 billion for manufacturing of advanced car battery (traction) systems and components.
- $800 million for biofuel research, development, and demonstration projects.
- $602 million to support the use of energy efficient technologies in building and in industry
- $500 million for training of green-collar workers (by the Department of Labor)
- $400 million for the Geothermal Technologies Program
- $400 million for electric vehicle technologies
- $300 million for energy efficient appliance rebates
- $300 million for state and local governments to purchase energy efficient vehicles
- $300 million to acquire electric vehicles for the federal vehicle fleet (GSA)
- $250 million to increase energy efficiency in low-income housing
- $204 million in funding for research and testing facilities at national laboratories
- $190 million in funding for wind, hydro, and other renewable energy projects
- $115 million to develop and deploy solar power technologies
- $110 million for the development of high efficiency vehicles
- $42 million in support of new deployments of fuel cell technologies

=== Housing ===
Total: $14.7 billion

- $4 billion to the Department of Housing and Urban Development (HUD) for repairing and modernizing public housing, including increasing the energy efficiency of units.
- $2.25 billion in tax credits for financing low-income housing construction
- $2 billion for Section 8 housing rental assistance
- $2 billion for the Neighborhood Stabilization Program to purchase and repair foreclosed vacant housing
- $1.5 billion for rental assistance to prevent homelessness
- $1 billion in community development block grants for state and local governments
- $555 million in mortgage assistance for wounded service members (Army Corps of Engineers)
- $510 million for the rehabilitation of Native American housing
- $250 million for energy efficient modernization of low-income housing
- $200 million for helping rural Americans buy homes (Department of Agriculture)
- $140 million in grants for independent living centers for elderly blind persons (Dept. of Education)
- $130 million for rural community facilities (Department of Agriculture)
- $100 million to help remove lead paint from public housing
- $100 million emergency food and shelter for homeless (Department of Homeland Security)

=== Scientific research ===
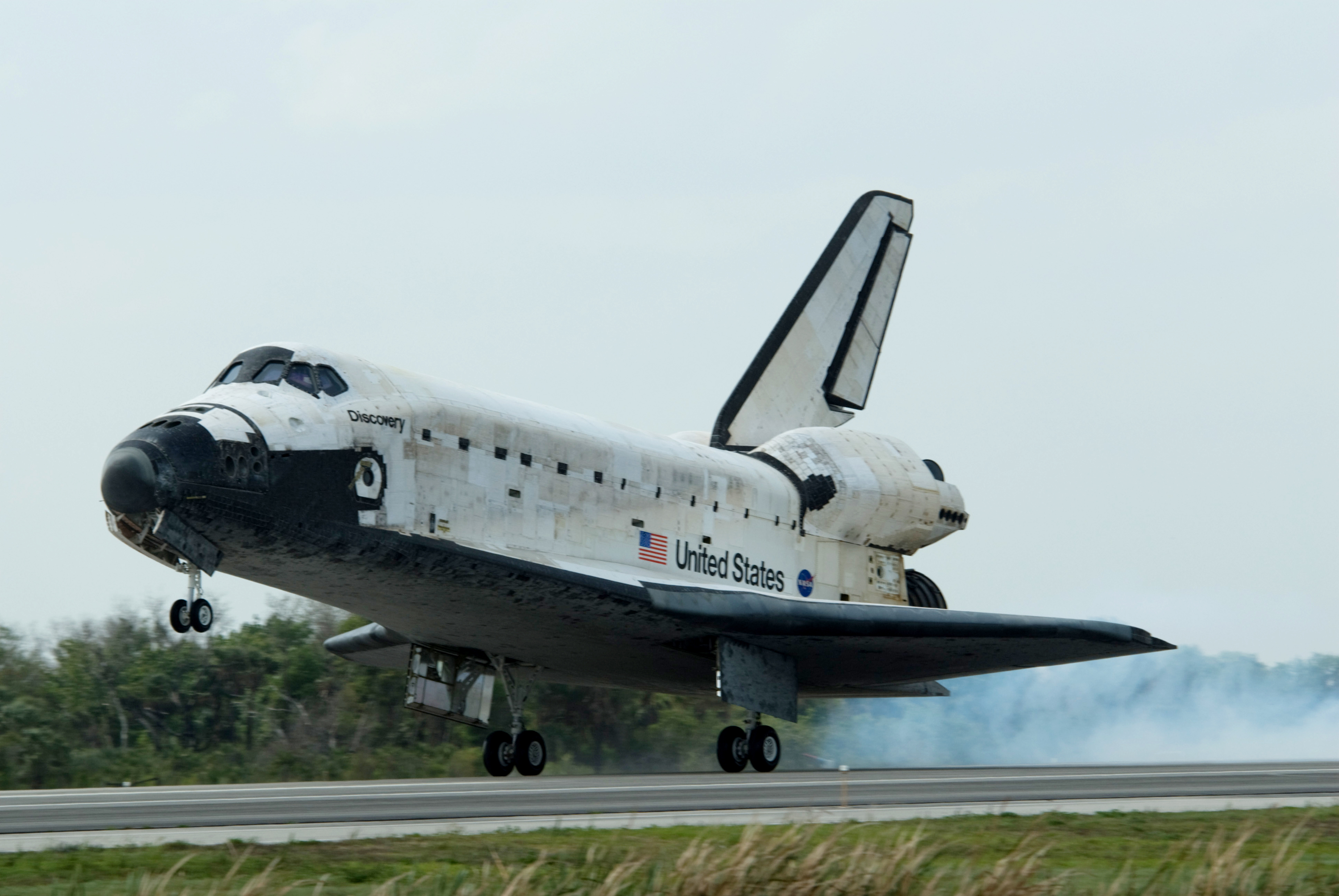
NASA is among the government agencies receiving additional funds under the act.

Total: $7.6 billion

- $3 billion to the National Science Foundation
- $2 billion to the United States Department of Energy
- $1 billion to NASA, including "$400 million for space exploration related activities. Of this amount, $50 million [was] to be used for the development of commercial crew space transportation concepts and enabling capabilities."
- $600 million to the National Oceanic and Atmospheric Administration (NOAA)
- $580 million to the National Institute of Standards and Technology, of which $68 million was spent on new major (+$1M) scientific instruments, $200M went to fund major scientific building construction at research universities, and $110M was spent on new buildings and major upgrades to existing facilities, including energy efficiency and solar panel arrays, at the Gaithersburg MD and Boulder CO campuses.
- $230 million for NOAA operations, research and facilities
- $140 million to the United States Geological Survey

=== Other ===
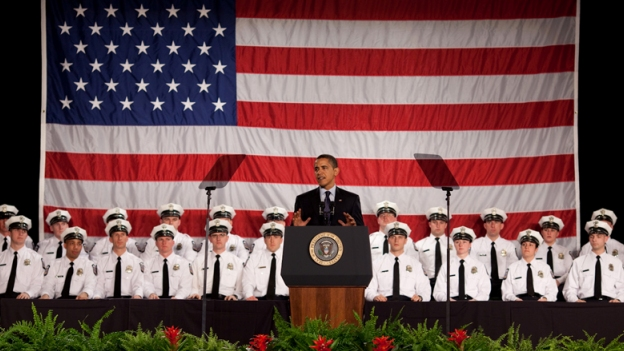
President Obama in Ohio on March 6, 2009, for the graduation of the Columbus Police Division's 114th Class

Total: $10.6 billion

- $4 billion for state and local law enforcement agencies
- $1.1 billion in waivers on interest payments for state unemployment trust funds
- $1 billion in preparation for the 2010 census
- $1 billion in added funding for child support enforcement
- $750 million for DTV conversion coupons and DTV transition education
- $749 million in crop insurance reinstatement, and emergency loans for farmers
- $730 million in SBA loans for small businesses
- $500 million for the Social Security Administration to process disability and retirement backlogs
- $201 million in additional funding for AmeriCorps and other community service organizations
- $150 million for Urban and Rural economic recovery programs
- $150 million for an increase of claims processing military staff
- $150 million in loans for rural businesses
- $50 million for the National Endowment for the Arts to support artists
- $50 million for the National Cemetery Administration

== Buy American provision ==
ARRA included a protectionist 'Buy American' provision, which imposed a general requirement that any public building or public works project funded by the new stimulus package must use only iron, steel and other manufactured goods produced in the United States.

A May 15, 2009, Washington Post article reported that the 'Buy American' provision of the stimulus package caused outrage in the Canadian business community, and that the government in Canada "retaliated" by enacting its own restrictions on trade with the U.S. On June 6, 2009, delegates at the Federation of Canadian Municipalities conference passed a resolution that would potentially shut out U.S. bidders from Canadian city contracts, in order to help show support for Prime Minister Stephen Harper's opposition to the "Buy American" provision. Sherbrooke Mayor Jean Perrault, president of the federation, stated, "This U.S. protectionist policy is hurting Canadian firms, costing Canadian jobs and damaging Canadian efforts to grow in the world-wide recession." On February 16, 2010, the United States and Canada agreed on exempting Canadian companies from Buy American provisions, which would have hurt the Canadian economy.

== Recommendations by economists ==
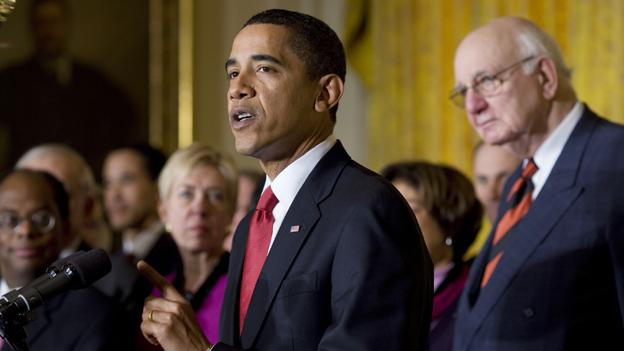
President Barack Obama announces the creation of the Economic Recovery Advisory Board on February 6, 2009.

Economists such as Martin Feldstein, Daron Acemoğlu, National Economic Council director Larry Summers, and Nobel Memorial Prize in Economic Sciences winners Joseph Stiglitz and Paul Krugman favored a larger economic stimulus to counter the economic downturn. While in favor of a stimulus package, Feldstein expressed concern over the act as written, saying it needed revision to address consumer spending and unemployment more directly. Just after the bill was enacted, Krugman wrote that the stimulus was too small to deal with the problem, adding, "And it's widely believed that political considerations led to a plan that was weaker and contains more tax cuts than it should have – that Mr. Obama compromised in advance in the hope of gaining broad bipartisan support." Conservative economist John Lott was more critical of the government spending.

On January 28, 2009, a full-page advertisement with the names of approximately 200 economists who were against Obama's plan appeared in The New York Times and The Wall Street Journal. This included Nobel Memorial Prize in Economic Sciences laureates Edward C. Prescott, Vernon L. Smith, and James M. Buchanan. The economists denied the quoted statement by President Obama that there was "no disagreement that we need action by our government, a recovery plan that will help to jumpstart the economy". Instead, the signers believed that "to improve the economy, policymakers should focus on reforms that remove impediments to work, saving, investment and production. Lower tax rates and a reduction in the burden of government are the best ways of using fiscal policy to boost growth." The funding for this advertisement came from the Cato Institute.

On February 8, 2009, a letter to Congress signed by about 200 economists in favor of the stimulus, written by the Center for American Progress Action Fund, said that Obama's plan "proposes important investments that can start to overcome the nation's damaging loss of jobs", and would "put the United States back onto a sustainable long-term-growth path". This letter was signed by Nobel Memorial laureates Kenneth Arrow, Lawrence R. Klein, Eric Maskin, Daniel McFadden, Paul Samuelson and Robert Solow. The New York Times published projections from IHS Global Insight, Moodys.com, Economy.com and Macroeconomic Advisers that indicated that the economy may have been worse without the ARRA.

A 2019 study in the American Economic Journal found that the stimulus had a positive impact on the US economy, but that the positive impact would have been greater if the stimulus had been more frontloaded.

== Congressional Budget Office reports ==
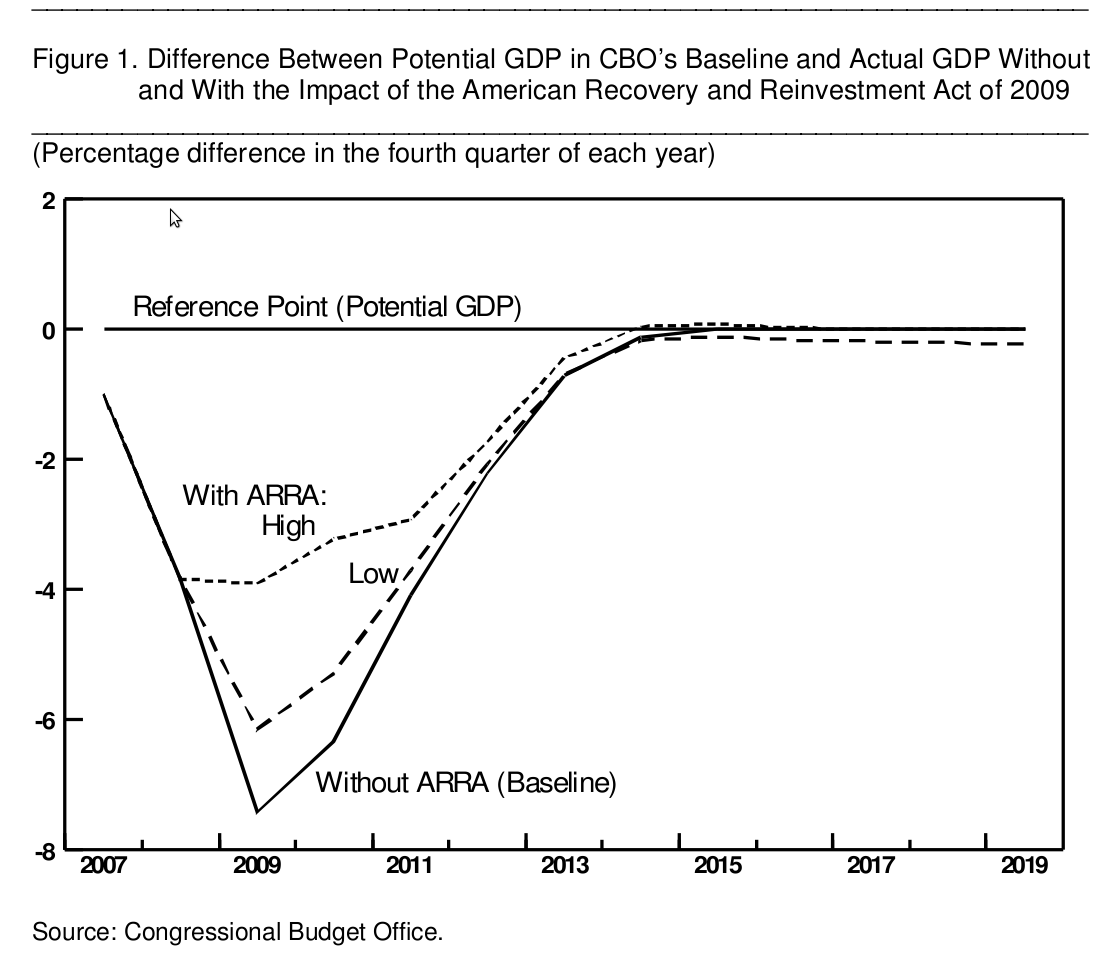
CBO estimates of the impact of the stimulus on GDP

The CBO estimated ARRA would positively impact GDP and employment. It projected an increase in the GDP of between 1.4 percent and 3.8 percent by the end of 2009, between 1.1 percent and 3.3 percent by the end of 2010, between 0.4 percent and 1.3 percent by the end of 2011, and a decrease of between zero and 0.2 percent beyond 2014. The impact to employment would be an increase of 0.8 million to 2.3 million by the end of 2009, an increase of 1.2 million to 3.6 million by the end of 2010, an increase of 0.6 million to 1.9 million by the end of 2011, and declining increases in subsequent years as the U.S. labor market reaches nearly full employment, but never negative. Decreases in GDP in 2014 and beyond are accounted for by crowding out, where government debt absorbs finances that would otherwise go toward investment. A 2013 study by economists Stephen Marglin and Peter Spiegler found the stimulus had boosted GDP in line with CBO estimates.

A February 4, 2009, report by the Congressional Budget Office (CBO) said that while the stimulus would increase economic output and employment in the short run, the GDP would, by 2019, have an estimated net decrease between 0.1% and 0.3% (as compared to the CBO estimated baseline).

The CBO estimated that enacting the bill would increase federal budget deficits by $185 billion over the remaining months of fiscal year 2009, by $399 billion in 2010, and by $134 billion in 2011, or $787 billion over the 2009–2019 period.

In a February 11 letter, CBO Director Douglas Elmendorf noted that there was disagreement among economists about the effectiveness of the stimulus, with some skeptical of any significant effects while others expecting very large effects. Elmendorf said the CBO expected short term increases in GDP and employment. In the long term, the CBO expects the legislation to reduce output slightly by increasing the nation's debt and crowding out private investment, but noted that other factors, such as improvements to roads and highways and increased spending for basic research and education may offset the decrease in output and that crowding out was not an issue in the short term because private investment was already decreasing in response to decreased demand.

In February 2015, the CBO released its final analysis of the results of the law, which found that during six years:

- Real GDP was boosted by an average ranging from a low of 1.7% to a high of 9.2%
- The unemployment rate was reduced by an average ranging from a low of 1.1 percentage points to a high of 4.8 percentage points
- Full-time equivalent employment-years was boosted by an average ranging from 2.1 million to 11.6 million
- Total outlays were $663 billion, of which $97 billion were refundable tax credits

== Recovery.gov ==
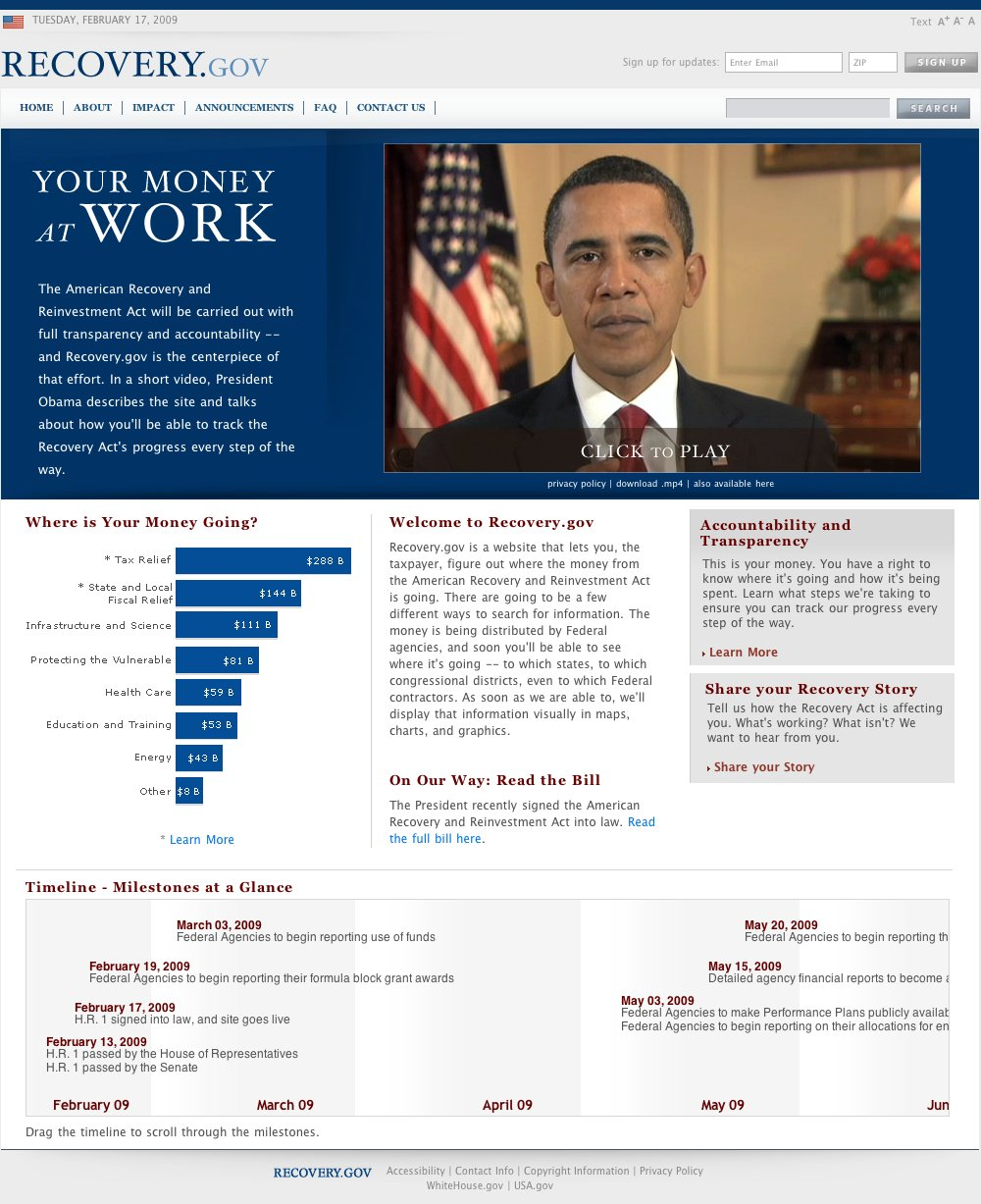
Recovery.gov, the website created for this Act

A May 21, 2009, article in The Washington Post stated, "To build support for the stimulus package, President Obama vowed unprecedented transparency, a big part of which, he said, would be allowing taxpayers to track money to the street level on Recovery.gov..." But three months after the bill was signed, Recovery.gov offers little beyond news releases, general breakdowns of spending, and acronym-laden spreadsheets and timelines." The same article also stated, "Unlike the government site, the privately run Recovery.org is actually providing detailed information about how the $787 billion in stimulus money is being spent."

Reports regarding errors in reporting on the Web site made national news. News stories circulated about Recovery.gov reporting fund distribution to congressional districts that did not exist.

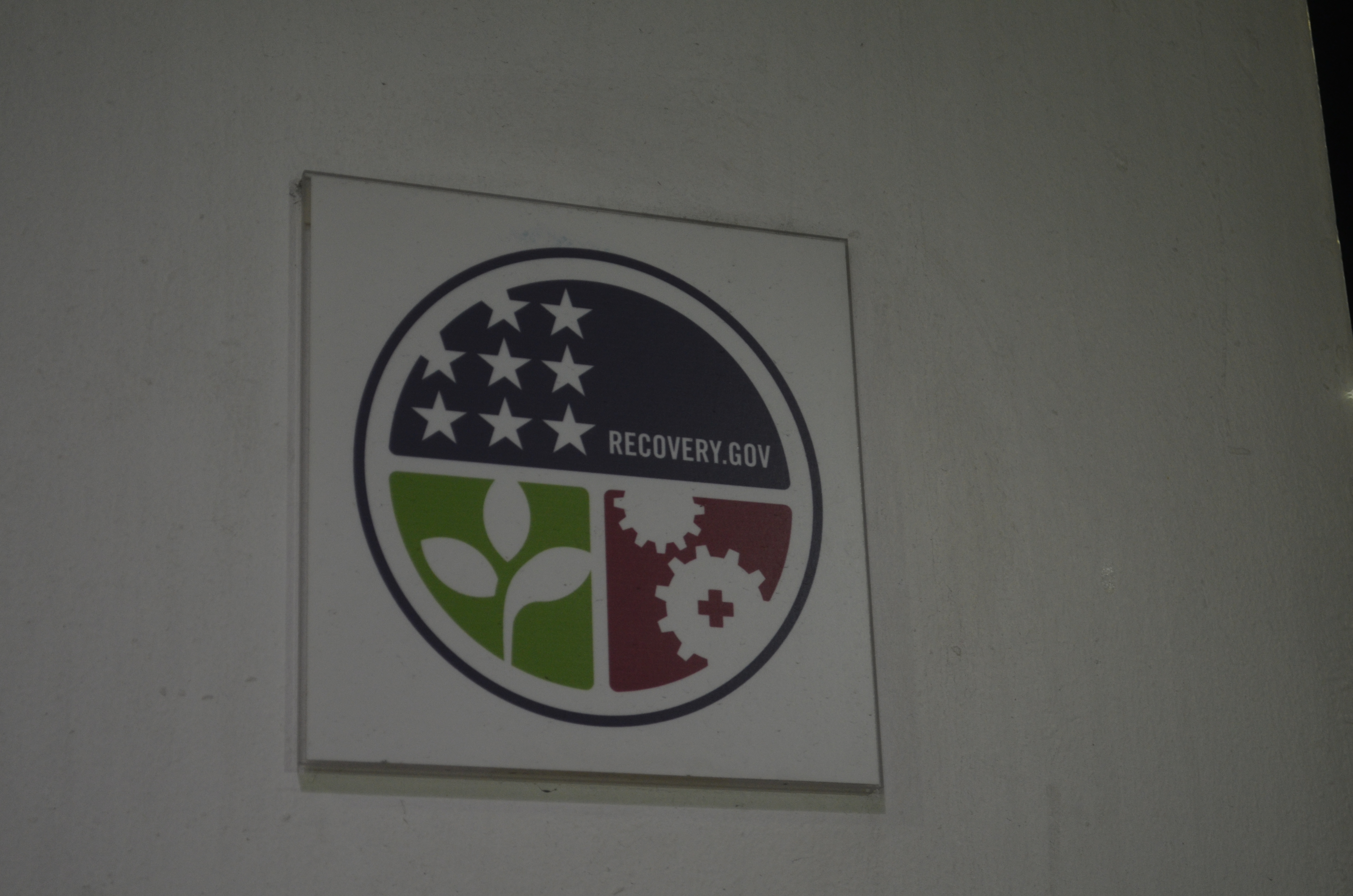
A recovery.gov plaque on public transport in Miami

A new Recovery.gov website was redesigned at a cost estimated to be $9.5 million (~$13.3 million in 2024) through January 2010.

On July 20, 2009, the Drudge Report published links to pages on Recovery.gov that Drudge alleged were detailing expensive contracts awarded by the U.S. Department of Agriculture for items such as individual portions of mozzarella cheese, frozen ham and canned pork, costing hundreds of thousands to over a million dollars. A statement released by the USDA the same day corrected the allegation, stating that "references to '2 pound frozen ham sliced' are to the sizes of the packaging. Press reports suggesting that the Recovery Act spent $1.191 million to buy "2 pounds of ham" are wrong. In fact, the contract in question purchased 760,000 pounds of ham for $1.191 million, at a cost of approximately $1.50 per pound."

As of 2016, the servers for recovery.gov have been shut down and the site is unavailable.

== Developments under the act and estimates of the act's effects ==
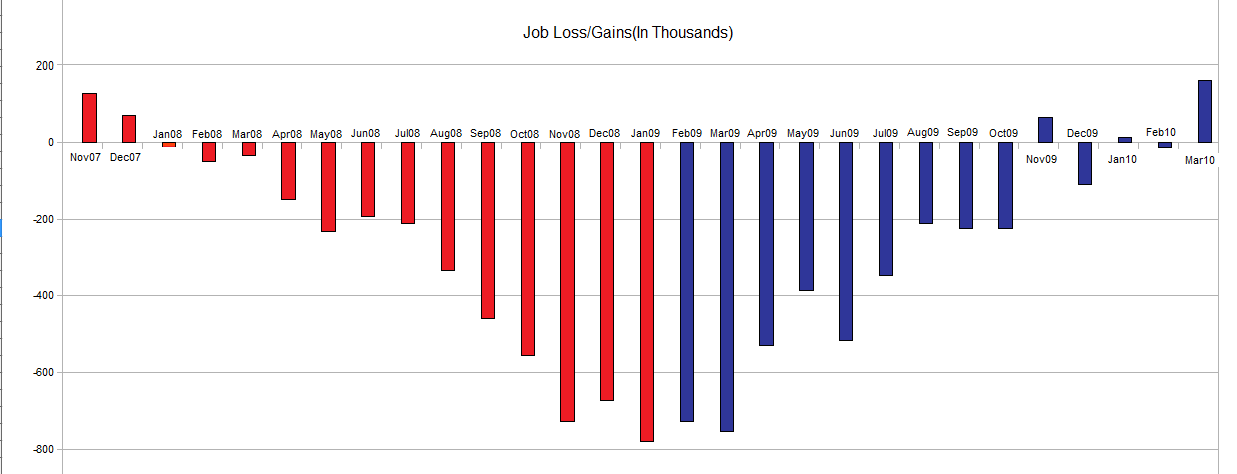
Chart of BLS job-loss data based on OFA's chart

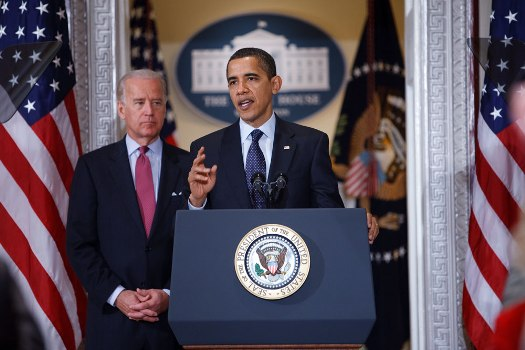
President Barack Obama and Vice President Joe Biden speak to state legislators about the implementation of the Recovery Act on March 20, 2009.

The Congressional Budget Office reported in October 2009 the reasons for the changes in the 2008 and 2009 deficits, which were approximately $460 billion and $1.41 trillion, respectively. The CBO estimated that ARRA increased the deficit by $200 billion (~$283 billion in 2024) for 2009, split evenly between tax cuts and additional spending, excluding any feedback effects on the economy.

On February 12, 2010, the Bureau of Labor Statistics, which regularly issues economic reports, published job-loss data on a month-by-month basis since 2000. Organizing for America, a community organizing project of the Democratic National Committee, prepared a chart presenting the BLS data for the period beginning in December 2007. OFA used the chart to argue, "As a result [of the Recovery Act], job losses are a fraction of what they were a year ago, before the Recovery Act began." Others argue that job losses always grow early in a recession and naturally slow down with or without government stimulus spending, and that the OFA chart was misleading.

In the primary justification for the stimulus package, the Obama administration and Democratic proponents presented a graph in January 2009 showing the projected unemployment rate with and without the ARRA. The graph showed that if ARRA was not enacted the unemployment rate would exceed 9%; but if ARRA was enacted it would never exceed 8%. After ARRA became law, the actual unemployment rate exceeded 8% in February 2009, exceeded 9% in May 2009, and exceeded 10% in October 2009. The actual unemployment rate was 9.2% in June 2011 when it was projected to be below 7% with the ARRA. However, supporters of the ARRA claim that this can be accounted for by noting that the actual recession was subsequently revealed to be much worse than any projections at the time when the ARRA was drawn up.

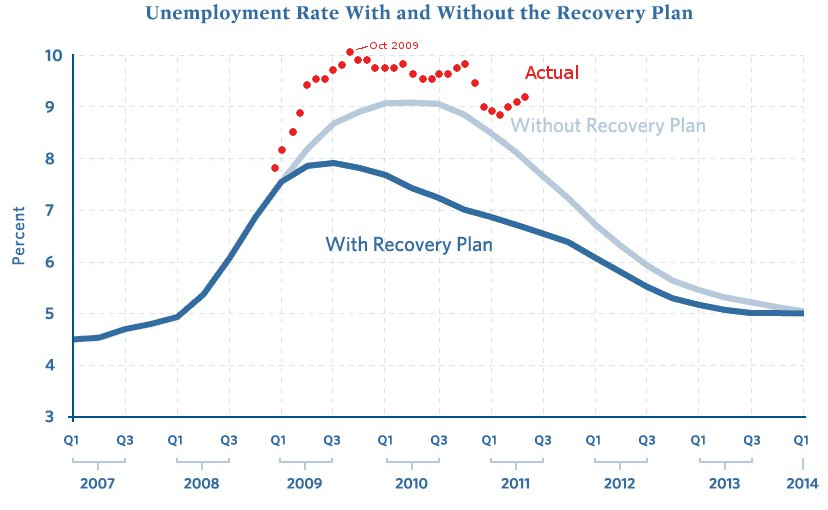
Projected Unemployment Rate

According to a March 2009 Industry Survey of and by the National Association of Business Economists, 60.3% of their economists who had reviewed the fiscal stimulus enacted in February 2009 projected it would have a modest impact in shortening the recession, with 29.4% anticipating little or no impact as well as 10.3% predicting a strong impact. The aspects of the stimulus expected by the NABE to have the greatest effectiveness were physical infrastructure, unemployment benefits expansion, and personal tax-rate cuts.

One year after the stimulus, several independent macroeconomic firms, including Moody's and IHS Global Insight, estimated that the stimulus saved or created 1.6 to 1.8 million jobs and forecast a total impact of 2.5 million jobs saved by the time the stimulus is completed. The Congressional Budget Office considered these estimates conservative. The CBO estimated according to its model 2.1 million jobs saved in the last quarter of 2009, boosting the economy by up to 3.5 percent and lowering the unemployment rate by up to 2.1 percent. The CBO projected that the package would have an even greater impact in 2010. The CBO also said, "It is impossible to determine how many of the reported jobs would have existed in the absence of the stimulus package." The CBO's report on the first quarter of 2010 showed a continued positive effect, with an employment gain in that quarter of up to 2.8 million and a GDP boost of up to 4.2 percent. Economists Timothy Conley of the University of Western Ontario and Bill Dupor of the Ohio State University found that while the stimulus' effects on public sector job creation were unambiguously positive, the effects on private sector job creation were ambiguous. Economist Dan Wilson of the Federal Reserve, who used similar methodology, without the same identified errors, estimates that "ARRA spending created or saved about 2 million jobs in its first year and over 3 million by March 2011."

The CBO also revised its assessment of the long-term impact of the bill. After 2014, the stimulus is estimated to decrease output by zero to 0.2%. The stimulus is not expected to have a negative impact on employment in any period of time.

In 2011, the Department of Commerce revised some of its previous estimates. Economist Dean Baker commented:

[T]he revised data ... showed that the economy was plunging even more rapidly than we had previously recognised in the two quarters following the collapse of Lehman. Yet, the plunge stopped in the second quarter of 2009 – just as the stimulus came on line. This was followed by respectable growth over the next four quarters. Growth then weakened again as the impact of the stimulus began to fade at the end of 2010 and the start of this year. In other words, the growth pattern shown by the revised data sure makes it appear that the stimulus worked. The main problem would seem to be that the stimulus was not big enough and it wasn't left in place long enough to lift the economy to anywhere near potential output.

The Democratic Congressional Campaign Committee (DCCC) established a "Hypocrisy Hall of Fame" to list Republican Representatives who had voted against ARRA but who then sought or took credit for ARRA programs in their districts. As of September 2011, the DCCC was listing 128 House Republicans in this category. Newsweek reported that many of the Republican legislators who publicly argued that the stimulus would not create jobs were writing letters seeking stimulus programs for their districts on the grounds that the spending would create jobs.

The stimulus has been criticized as being too small. In July 2010, a group of 40 prominent economists issued a statement calling for expanded stimulus programs to reduce unemployment. They also challenged the view that the priority should be reducing the deficit: "Making deficit reduction the first target, without addressing the chronic underlying deficiency of demand, is exactly the error of the 1930s."

In July 2010, the White House Council of Economic Advisers (CEA) estimated that the stimulus had "saved or created between 2.5 and 3.6 million jobs as of the second quarter of 2010". At that point, spending outlays under the stimulus totaled $257 billion and tax cuts totaled $223 billion. In July 2011, the CEA estimated that as of the first quarter of 2011, the ARRA raised employment relative to what it otherwise would have been by between 2.4 and 3.6 million. The sum of outlays and tax cuts up to this point was $666 billion. Using a straight mathematical calculation, critics reported that the ARRA cost taxpayers between $185,000 to $278,000 per job that was created, though this computation does not include the permanent infrastructure that resulted.

In August 2010, Republican Senators Tom Coburn and John McCain released a report listing 100 projects it described as the "most wasteful projects" funded by the act. In total, the projects questioned by the two senators amounted to about $15 billion, or less than 2% of the $862 billion. The two senators did concede that the stimulus has had a positive effect on the economy, though they criticized it for failing to give "the biggest bang for our buck" on the issue of job creation. CNN noted that the two senators' stated objections were brief summaries presenting selective accounts that were unclear, and the journalists pointed out several instances where they created erroneous impressions.

One of the primary purposes and promises of the act was to launch a large number of "shovel ready" projects that would generate jobs. However, a sizable number of these projects, most of which pertained to infrastructure, took longer to implement than they had expected by most. By 2010, Obama said he had come to realize 'there's no such thing as shovel-ready projects.'

Some of the tax incentives in the act, including those related to the American opportunity tax credit and Earned Income Tax Credit, were extended for a further two years by the Tax Relief, Unemployment Insurance Reauthorization, and Job Creation Act of 2010.

In November 2011, the Congressional Budget Office (CBO) updated its earlier reports concerning the act. The CBO stated that "the employment effects began to wane at the end of 2010 and have continued to do so throughout 2011." Nevertheless, in the third quarter of 2011, the CBO estimated that the act had increased the number of full-time equivalent jobs by 0.5 million to 3.3 million. Section 1513 of the Recovery Act stated that reports on the impact of the act were to be submitted quarterly, however the last report issued occurred for the second quarter of 2011. As of December 2012, 58.6% of Americans are employed.

In 2013, the Reason Foundation, an American libertarian group, conducted a study of the results of the ARRA. Only 23% of the 8,381 sampled companies hired new workers and kept all of them when the project was completed. Also, just 41% of sampled companies hired workers at all, while 30% of sampled companies did hire but laid off all workers once the government money stopped funding. These results cast doubt on previously stated estimates of job creation numbers, which do not factor those companies that did not retain their workers or hire any at all.

In February 2014, the White House stated in a release that the stimulus measure saved or created an average of 1.6 million jobs a year between 2009 and 2012, thus averting having the recession descend into another Great Depression. Republicans, such as House speaker John Boehner of Ohio, criticized the report since, in their views, the act cost too much for too little result.

== Oversight and administration ==
In addition to the Vice President Biden's oversight role, a high-level advisory body, the President's Economic Recovery Advisory Board (later renamed and reconstituted as the "President's Council on Jobs and Competitiveness"), was named concurrent to the passage of the act.

As well, the president named Inspector General of the United States Department of the Interior Earl Devaney and the Recovery Accountability and Transparency Board (RATB) to monitor administration of the act, and prevent low levels of fraud, waste and loss in fund allocation. Eleven other inspectors general served on the RATB, and the board also had a Recovery Independent Advisory Panel.

In late 2011, Devaney and his fellow inspectors general on RATB, and more who were not, were credited with avoiding any major scandals in the administration of the act, in the eyes of one Washington observer.

In May 2016, the chairman of the U.S. Senate Finance Committee, Senator Orrin Hatch (R-UT), launched the first steps of an investigation into a part of the stimulus law that gave grants to solar and green energy companies. Hatch sent a letter to the IRS and Treasury Department with a list of questions about the program. According to the Wall Street Journal, letters from senior senators who chair committees can lead to formal investigations by Congress.

One part of the stimulus law, Section 1603, gave cash grants to solar companies to encourage investment in solar technology. Because many companies did not yet make a profit in 2009 in that industry, they were offered cash instead of tax credits. In September 2015, the U.S. government asked that a Spanish company return $1 million (~$1.29 million in 2024) it had received from the program. The company issued a statement saying it fully complied with the request.

== See also ==
- Internal Revenue Service Restructuring and Reform Act of 1998
- 2008 financial crisis
- Economic Stimulus Act of 2008
- 2009 energy efficiency and renewable energy research investment
- 2010 United States federal budget
- Build America Bonds
- Economic Recovery and Middle-Class Tax Relief Act of 2009
- Energy law of the United States
- 2008 European Union stimulus plan
- Federalreporting.gov
- Pathways out of Poverty (POP)
- Race to the Top
- School Improvement Grant
- Tax Credit Assistance Program
- American Rescue Plan Act of 2021
