= Avon Fire and Rescue Service =

Fire and rescue service in South West England

Operational area
- Country: United Kingdom
- Unitary Authorities: Bath and North East Somerset, Bristol, North Somerset, and South Gloucestershire
- Address: Police & Fire Headquarters, PO Box 37, Valley Road, Portishead, Bristol, BS20 8JJ

Agency overview
- Established: 1 April 1974; 52 years ago
- Annual calls: 20,009 (2019–2020)
- Employees: ~900
- Annual budget: £43 million (2019–2020)
- Chief Fire Officer: Matt Cook

Facilities and equipment
- Stations: 21
- Engines: 34

Website
- www.avonfire.gov.uk

Avon Fire & Rescue Service (AF&RS) is the fire and rescue service covering the unitary authorities of Bath and North East Somerset, Bristol, North Somerset, and South Gloucestershire in South West England.

The headquarters of the service is co-located with Avon and Somerset Police in Portishead. It has 21 fire stations and 34 fire engines across its area, which covers 515 square miles (1,330 km^{2}) with a population of 1.9 million.

== History ==
Avon Fire Brigade was created in 1974, when the county of Avon was created. In 1996, the county was abolished and four separate unitary authorities were created. Administration of the service was taken over by a joint fire authority made up of councillors from the four unitary authorities. In 2004, the Fire and Rescue Services Act was passed. To better reflect the changing roles and responsibilities of the fire service, Avon Fire Brigade changed its name to Avon Fire & Rescue Service.

Fleur Lombard (1974 – 4 February 1996) was the first female firefighter to die on duty in peacetime Britain, while Avon Fire and Rescue Service were fighting a supermarket fire in Staple Hill. The Fleur Lombard Bursary Fund provides travel grants so that a junior member of any UK fire and rescue service may visit the fire service of another country.

In September 2017, the service's headquarters was moved from Temple Back, Bristol to the Avon and Somerset Police headquarters in Portishead. Following the move, an unexpected number of support staff left the service, resulting in recruitment delays in finding replacement staff.

== Community safety ==
The role of a modern fire and rescue service has increased from fighting fires to cover the core functions of 'Protecting, Preventing and Responding'. AF&RS now has a wider remit promoting community safety through events and education work, alongside attending a range of incidents and emergencies from road traffic collisions and fires, to flooding and chemical spills. The fire service aims to cut the risk of fire developing in the first place by promoting safety messages to local residents and encouraging people to have working smoke alarms.

AF&RS runs community safety campaigns.

The Car Clear scheme was launched in 2001, with the intention of promptly removing abandoned vehicles from streets. This eliminates the possibility of arson attacks.

== Operations ==
Avon Fire & Rescue Service utilises a range of emergency equipment. These include 81 appliances, 51 pumping appliances, four turntable ladders and 16 special appliances. Adding to the available emergency response can also be their boats, pods, fork lift trucks, a Control Emergency Evacuation Vehicle and a telescopic handler. In 2009 and 2011 the service added two PolyBilt-bodied Combined Aerial Rescue Platforms (CARP). The first began service at Patchway fire station and was subsequently moved to Speedwell fire station. The second was assigned to Bedminster fire station. However, both of these appliances have been withdrawn from service by July 2016 and the bodywork has been removed from the chassis to allow for the chassis to be used for new specialist appliances.

Also, in 2009, Yate fire station was upgraded to "whole-time/retained status". Firefighters would now be ready to respond from the fire station 24/7. This was a preparedness upgrade from the previously "day-crewed" status of 08:00–17:00 hours daily and firefighters responding from their homes and work places.

As part of the "Investing for the Future" programme, which began in 2014, Kingswood fire station was closed for refurbishment. The Kingswood fire station project was completed and subsequently Speedwell fire station closed permanently all in 2015. In 2016, the Chairman of Avon Fire Authority, Councillor Peter Abraham, stated "The regeneration of Keynsham town centre meant we needed to move the existing Keynsham fire station. This has provided us with an opportunity to amalgamate the part-time station at Keynsham and Brislington fire station, which will both close, into a new Wholetime fire station at Hicks Gate" which is situated by the Bristol ring road and opened on 19 April 2016.

== Performance ==
Every fire and rescue service in England and Wales is subjected to a periodic statutory inspection by His Majesty's Inspectorate of Constabulary and Fire & Rescue Services (HMICFRS).

As of January 2023, the HMICFRS have discontinued the three key categories and now grade on 11 key areas instead. Each is rated on a five-point scale of outstanding, good, adequate, requires improvement and inadequate.

HMICFRS Inspection Ratings
Assessment	Rating 2018/19	Rating 2021/22	Rating 2023/25
Understanding the risk of fire and other emergencies	Requires improvement	Requires improvement	Inadequate
Preventing fires and other risks	Requires improvement	Requires improvement	Inadequate
Protecting the public through fire regulation	Requires improvement	Requires improvement	Adequate
Responding to fires and other emergencies	Requires improvement	Requires improvement	Inadequate
Responding to major and multi-agency incidents	Requires improvement	Requires improvement	Adequate
Making best use of resources	Requires improvement	Requires improvement	Requires improvement
Making the FRS affordable now and in the future	Requires improvement	Requires improvement	Requires improvement
Promoting the right values and culture	Inadequate	Requires improvement	Inadequate
Getting the right people with the right skills	Inadequate	Requires improvement	Requires improvement
Ensuring fairness and promoting diversity	Inadequate	Requires improvement	Requires improvement
Managing performance and developing leaders	Inadequate	Requires improvement	Requires improvement

== Criticisms ==
=== Discrimination in recruitment ===
In 2009, it emerged that the service had banned white males from four out of five of its recruitment workshops, with two only open to ethnic minorities and two for females only. The practice was criticised as illegal and divisive, with MP Philip Davies noting "the only way we are ever going to have complete equality in the job market is to give people jobs based on merit, regardless of their race, religion, or sexual orientation". He questioned "how would people react if women and black people were banned from an open day?". The Bristol charity Support Against Racist Incidents similarly criticised the practice, arguing that there "has to be a level playing field; that's the law".

=== 2017 governance changes ===
On 28 July 2017, Chief Fire Officer Kevin Pearson was suspended following the publication of a report from the Home Office on an investigation into how the service is run, citing that it was being run as an "old boys' club", with endemic bullying, and that Pearson had been "unchallenged and not held properly to account for too long". Deputy Chief Fire Officer Lorraine Houghton was also suspended.

The service is governed by the Avon Fire Authority, which has a total of 25 councillors from the four councils within the region. Following the suspension of Pearson, the board met on 2 August 2017 to discuss what changes needed to be made and how the authority should be governed in the future, but no conclusion was reached. The authority released a statement afterwards announcing that it could not "fix itself" and that the police and crime commissioner, Sue Mountstevens is to be appointed to the board in September. Mountstevens has said following the release of the report that she was considering a takeover of the area's fire service.

On 11 August 2017, it was announced that Mick Crennell had been appointed as the interim chief fire officer on a six-month contract, whilst the investigation of Pearson is taking place. Crennell previously served as deputy chief fire officer of Mid and West Wales Fire and Rescue Service. In April 2018, Crennell was appointed chief fire officer.

Following the 2017 report, AFRS commissioned a consultancy firm to conduct an independent review of the themes raised by staff. The review, which had a response rate of 70% from AFRS staff, found that staff were afraid for their mental health and that bullying was ingrained within the service. Staff across all areas of AFRS complained of a lack of feedback, high workloads and the tone of internal communications within the service. There were also complaints from women staff, who felt they had to work harder than their male counterparts; and on-call firefighters who felt inferior to their wholetime colleagues. In March 2019 AFRS published a response to the initial report and subsequent independent review. The report promised a zero-tolerance approach, retraining for middle management, and training for all employees in equality, diversity and inclusion.

=== High-risk sites ===
In December 2018, Her Majesty's Inspectorate of Constabulary and Fire & Rescue Services found that Avon was not "doing enough to keep the public safe through regulation of fire safety", after it found that only 115 of 9,317 high-risk locations had up-to-date fire safety information that had been audited within the most recent 12-month period.

== Stations and appliances ==
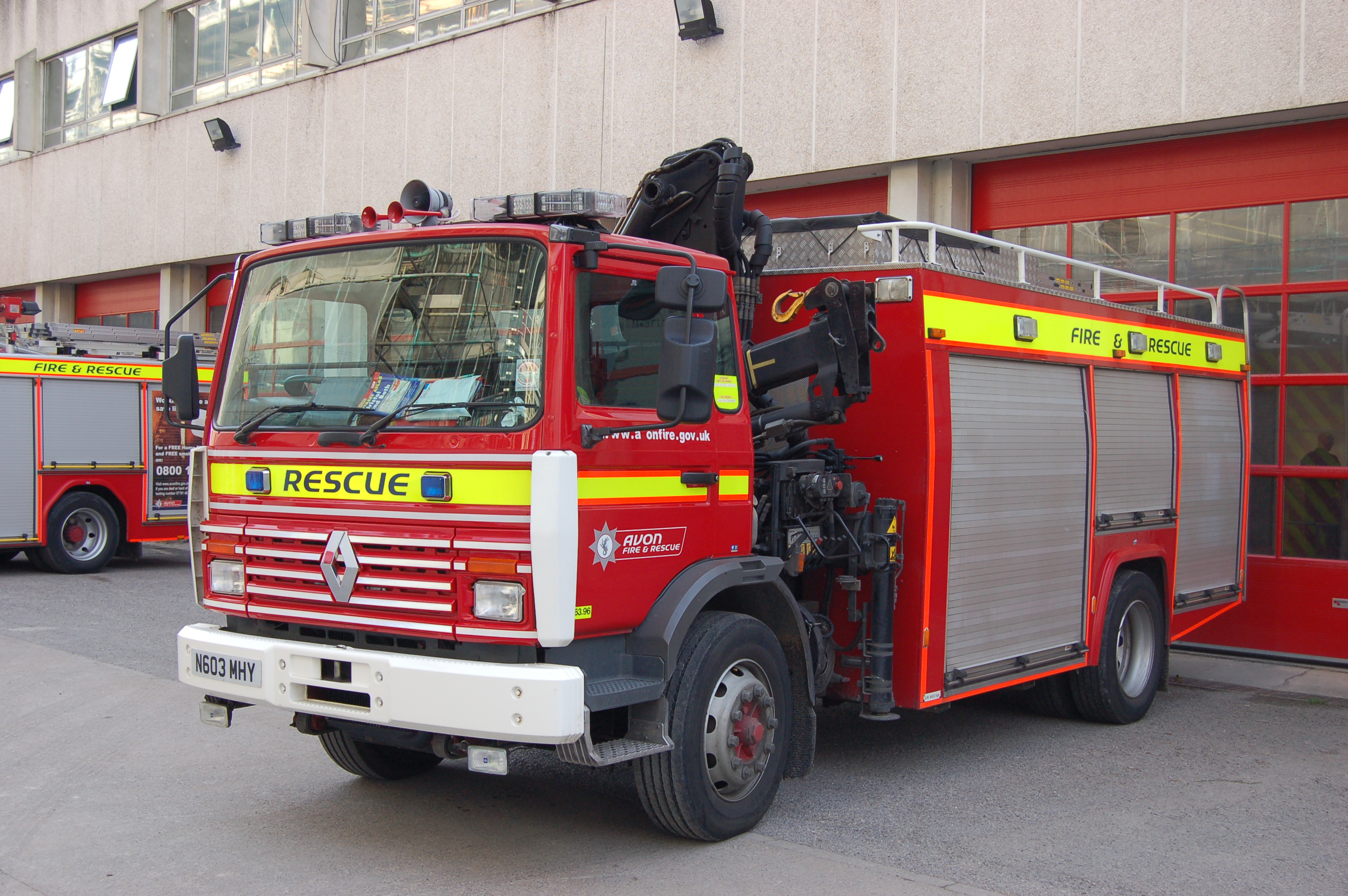
Rescue vehicle outside Temple fire station in 2008

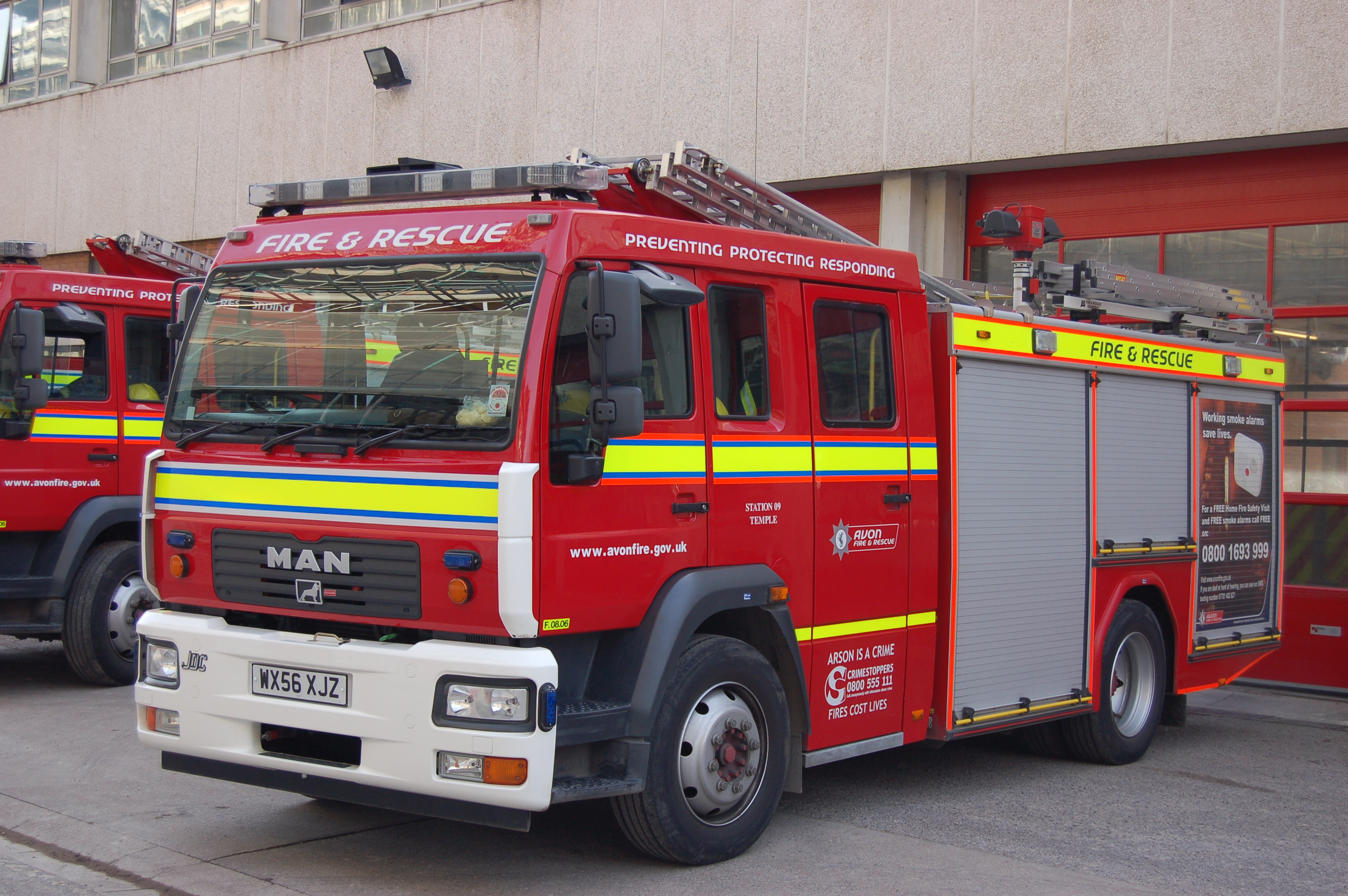
Fire engine outside Temple fire station in 2008

As of 2021, AF&RS has 21 fire stations, employing 425 wholetime firefighters and 174 on-call firefighters. Its Emergency Control Room employs 44 control staff.

AF&RS fire stations use 34 frontline fire engines, which includes four rescue pumps.

It also operates a number of specialist appliances that are used for response, resilience, or urban search and rescue (USAR) purposes.

== See also ==
- Fire service in the United Kingdom
- List of British firefighters killed in the line of duty
- Bath fire station
