= Fire safety officer =

Rank of firefighter in the United Kingdom

In the United Kingdom fire and rescue services a fire safety officer (sometimes referred to as a fire officer) is a firefighter who has attained the rank of sub-officer (also known as a watch commander) or above, and transferred from front line operational service into the Fire Safety Department.

The term "fire officer" may also refer to a fire safety inspector who is of equivalent rank in the fire safety section of the fire service.

== Career structure ==
Most fire officers choose to transfer into the department because it offers the opportunity of working normal office hours as opposed to the shift system operational firefighters have to work. Others transfer because it is an alternative way to climb the promotional ladder or because it is an opportunity to experience another aspect of the fire service's role.

In some fire services a fire officer may be a civilian.

== Duties and powers ==
Fire officers inspect all manner of commercial premises to ensure that they comply with current fire safety legislation. A fire safety officer can work anywhere local. If premises are found to be unsafe a fire officer may prosecute the offending organization or even issue a prohibition notice closing the premises until such time that they are made safe.

Fire officers also have the power to place anyone committing an offence under police caution. While a fire officer is employed by a fire service, any action they undertake is done under the auspices of the local fire and rescue authority.

== Fire and Safety Forum ==
FSF is an independent awarding body founded in 2009. India-based independent examination board delivering vocational qualifications in health, safety and environmental practice and management. FSF qualifications are highly regarded throughout the world, setting the standards for those working in or looking to work in the Health & Safety Industry

== See also ==
- Women in firefighting
