= Fire safety inspector =

Law enforcement officer

In the United Kingdom a fire safety inspector (also known as fire officer, fire safety inspecting officer or fire safety officer) is a public law enforcement officer responsible for the enforcement fire safety legislation in the United Kingdom.

As public law enforcement officers, fire inspectors are duty bound, by law, to enforce fire safety legislation in the name of the Chief Fire Officer and the Chair of the Fire Rescue Authority of the Fire & Rescue Authority they are employed by, for the protection of members of the general public.

In turn the Chief Fire Officer discharges power of authority by order of a Secretary of State (In England and Wales) or their equivalent in Scotland and Northern Ireland.

Fire inspectors, like any other major enforcing officers from other enforcing authorities, have the same powers of authority of that of a police constable except that they cannot arrest persons. They can not, except in the event of fire or emergency, make forceable entry, unless first obtaining a warrant.

There are three distinct sets of legislation covering all four countries within the United Kingdom. They are:

- The Regulatory Reform (Fire Safety) Order 2005 & Fire & Rescue Services Act 2004 (England & Wales)
- The Fire (Scotland) Act 2005 and the Fire Safety (Scotland) Regulations 2006 (Scotland)
- The Fire and Rescue Services (NI) Order 2006 (Northern Ireland)

== Powers ==
=== Background ===
Fire authorities' powers are derived from several pieces of legislation. Fire authorities are also 'approved inspectors' under the Health and Safety at Work etc. Act 1974 as "Inspectors of Health and Safety".

The primary pieces of legislation are:

- Fire and Rescue Services Act 2004
- Regulatory Reform (Fire Safety) Order 2005

Fire authorities also receive official authority from the Licensing Act 2003 and the Fireworks Act 2003.

=== Enforcement ===
Inspectors have powers to enter premises for the purposes of undertaking routine fire safety inspections. They can also close (prohibit) or restrict the use of unsafe buildings, issue other legal notices which enforce compliance with current fire safety legislation. Failure to comply with a notice is ordinarily a criminal offence.

Most routine inspections result in minor failings being found and this is normally dealt with by a report which asks for the deficiencies to addressed within a certain timescale. More serious cases however may warrant that immediate action is taken to reduce the risk to building occupants. In some cases the buildings may be closed or the use of the building restricted because of a deemed risk to public and building occupant's safety.

Inspectors also have powers investigate the commission of an offence, and where a person or organisation is suspected of committing an offence which has specifically put persons at imminent risk of injury or death those persons or organisations are usually prosecuted.

All suspects are cautioned and invited to attend a "PACE Interview". A PACE interview is a taped interview, under the provisions of Code E issued under the Police and Criminal Evidence Act 1984, where suspects are placed under caution and asked questions pertinent to the investigation. Transcripts of the interview can then be used in court.

==== Enforcing authorities ====
Different organisations enforce fire safety legislation depending on the nature of the premises. They are defined as "Enforcing Authorities", and are:

1. A fire and rescue authority. They enforce all premises within their area, with the exception of any premises that fall within the scope of the following enforcing authorities.
2. The Health and Safety Executive (HSE) are the enforcing authority for the following premises:
- premises licensed under section 1 of the Nuclear Installations Act 1965 (except for Crown premises)
- a Royal Navy ship under repair, construction, or conversion by any person other than the master or crew of that ship.
- a construction site or building under reconstruction as a whole (note; if the premises is partly occupied, the enforcing authority will default to another applicable enforcing authority).
1. The fire service maintained by the Secretary of Defence (the MOD Fire Service) for all armed forces premises except Royal Navy ships as mentioned above.
2. A local authority for sports stadia/stands
3. A fire inspector, for any premises which are owned or occupied by the Crown.

Note: There is a distinct difference between an "inspector" and a "fire inspector".

1. "Inspector" is a person appointed by one of the first four authorities listed above, and are appointed to enable that authority (as an entity) to discharge its duties under the order. Therefore, any 'notice' issued by an inspector on a premises, is done so in the name of that authority.

2. Although in law a "fire inspector" is a person appointed directly by the secretary of state to enforce fire safety standards in Crown premises and is as such a person appointed as an 'enforcing authority' in their own right, the term fire inspector refers more widely to any inspector who enforces fire safety legislation.

== Role ==
=== Background ===
Most fire safety inspectors are uniformed officers and are professional firefighters who have transferred from front line service into the Fire Safety Department of the Fire & Rescue Service in which they work. Most Inspectors are of Watch Commander / Watch Manager rank or above.

Some Fire & Rescue Services employ inspectors who have not had firefighting experience, but instead have experience in Fire Safety related fields in employment outside of the Fire Service. For example, in the Western Australian fire authorities' Built Environment Branch (AKA Fire Safety Branch), none of their Fire Safety Officers have transferred from that agency's operational fire fighter ranks. They are career specialist operatives with extensive fire technology skills and qualifications.

=== Confusion over the role with fire investigators ===
Fire safety inspectors undertake criminal investigations. They do not however investigate how a fire may have started. Whilst the cause of a fire may be pivotal to any criminal proceedings taken by Inspectors the actual job of establishing the cause of the fire is often very technical and requires the expert knowledge of a fire investigator.

A fire investigator however has no powers to enforce legislation, so their role is to provide evidence for Fire Inspectors to take forward.
