= Greenhouse gas emissions by the United States =

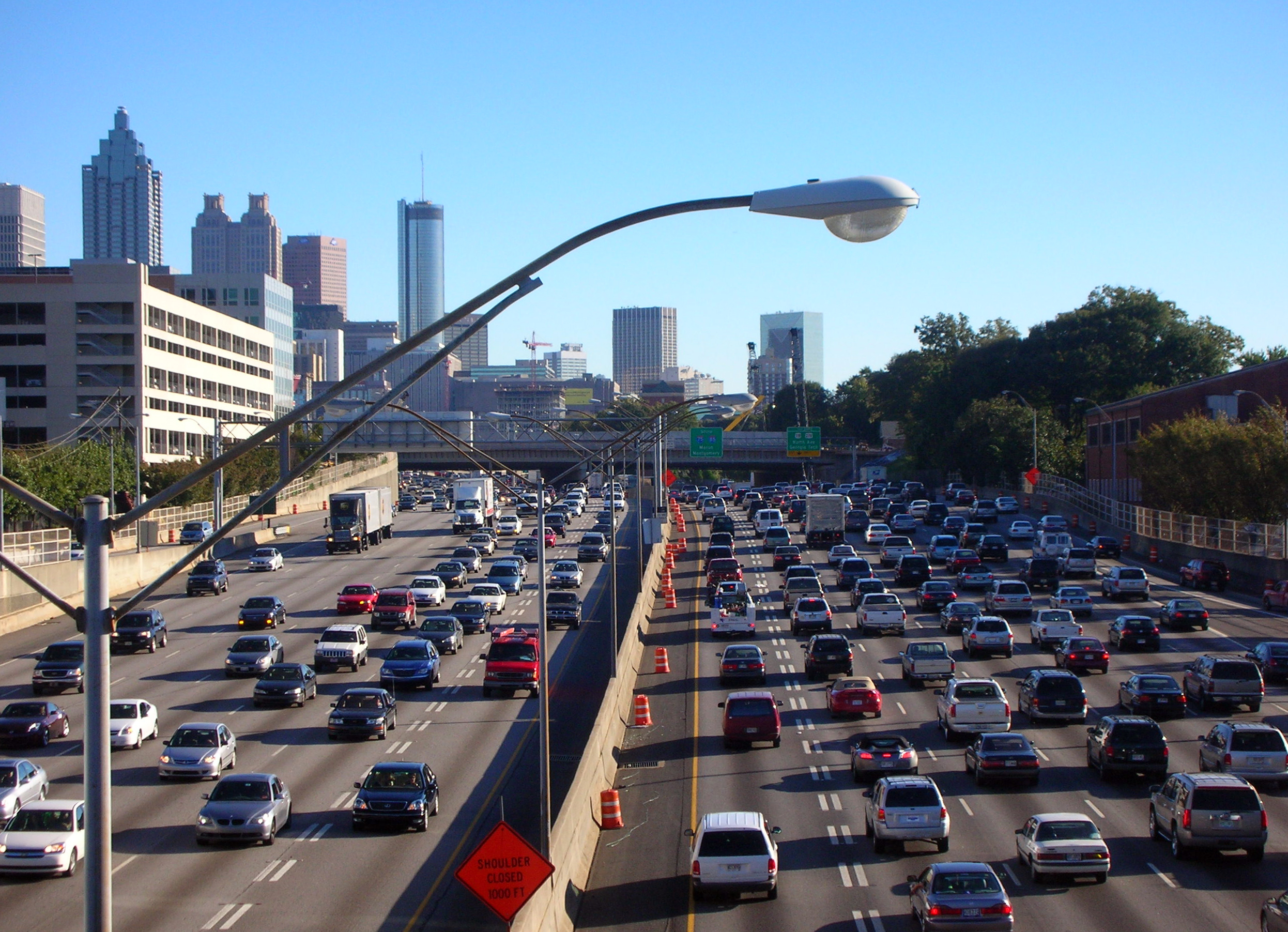
Transportation is the largest source of greenhouse gas emissions in the U.S.

Though the U.S.'s per capita and per GDP emissions have declined significantly, the raw numerical decline in emissions is much less substantial.

The U.S. has among the highest per person emissions, of the countries that emit the most greenhouse gases.

The U.S. has been the predominant producer of natural gas, whose primary component is the greenhouse gas methane.

Greenhouse gas emissions in the U.S., arranged by economic sector

Annual US CO_{2} emissions are about a third that of China, which has about four times the population.

The United States produced 7 billion metric tons of carbon dioxide equivalent greenhouse gas (GHG) emissions in 2025, the second largest in the world after greenhouse gas emissions by China and among the countries with the highest greenhouse gas emissions per person. In 2025 China is estimated to have emitted 29% of world GHG, followed by the United States with 12%, then India with 7%. In total the United States has emitted a quarter of world GHG, more than any other country. Annual emissions are over 15 tons per person and, amongst the top eight emitters, it is the highest country by greenhouse gas emissions per person.

The IEA estimates that the richest decile in the US emits over 55 tonnes of CO_{2} per capita each year. Because coal-fired power stations are gradually shutting down, in the 2010s emissions from electricity generation fell to second place behind transportation which is now the largest single source. In 2020, 27% of the GHG emissions of the United States were from transportation, 25% from electricity, 24% from industry, 13% from commercial and residential buildings and 11% from agriculture.

U.S. energy-related CO_{2} emissions decreased by 3% in 2023, amounting to a reduction of approximately 134 million metric tons (MMmt). This reduction primarily occurred in the electric power sector, with a significant shift from coal-fired power to less carbon-intense fossil fuels such as natural gas, as well as sustainable energy sources like solar.

In 2021, the electric power sector was the second largest source of U.S. greenhouse gas emissions, accounting for 25% of the U.S. total. U.S. greenhouse gas emissions are contributing to climate change in the United States, as well as worldwide.

== Background ==
=== In context of climate change ===
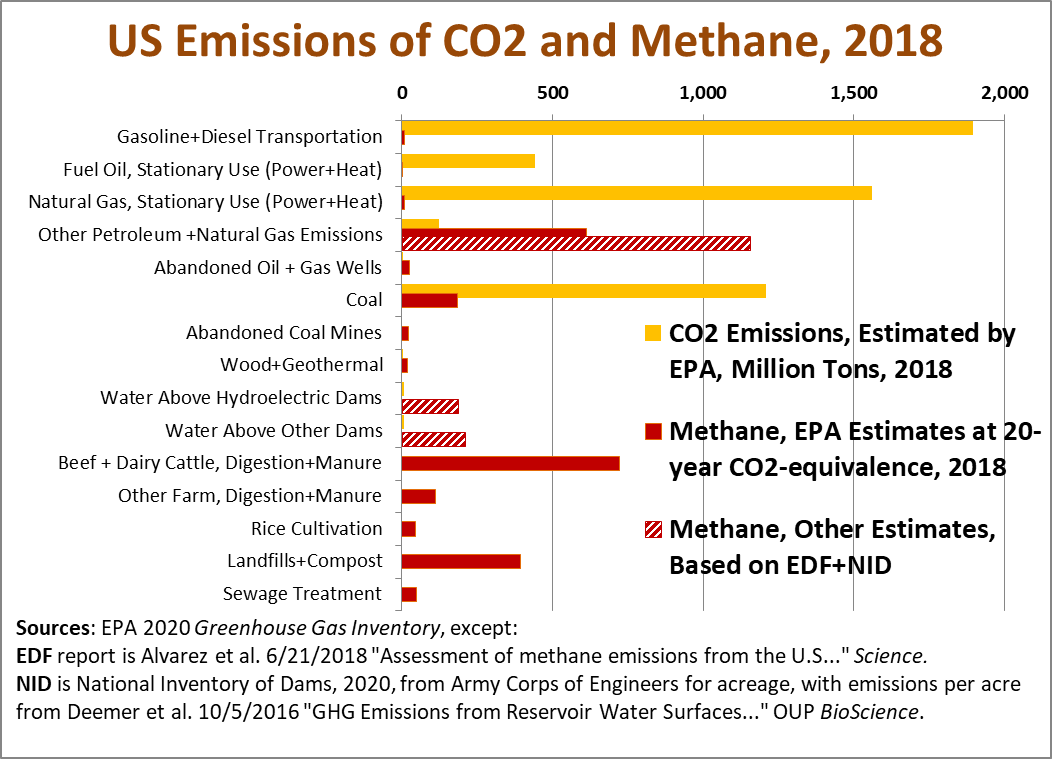
US emissions of CO_{2} and methane, 2018

Since 1850, the United States has cumulatively contributed the greatest amount of greenhouse gases of any nation or region.

Since 1850, the United States has cumulatively contributed the greatest amount of CO_{2} of any nation.

Greenhouse gases absorb radiant energy from the Earth after the surface is warmed by sunlight. US emissions in 2022 involved carbon dioxide (CO_{2}, 79.7%), methane (CH_{4}, 11.1%), nitrous oxide (N_{2}O, 6.1%) and other gases (e.g., fluorinated gases, 3.1%).

Greenhouse gases vary in how long they remain in the atmosphere. Though methane and nitrous oxide are more potent greenhouse gasses than CO_{2}, CO_{2} is longer-lived, remaining in the atmosphere for centuries. The average CO_{2} concentration in 2024 was over 424 parts per million (ppm), and exceeded 427 ppm in February 2025—each more than 50% higher than its pre-industrial level. Annual US national CO_{2} emissions were exceeded only by those of China, which has four times the US population. Regardless of where emissions occur, the emitted gases spread around the world. This anthropogenic (human-caused) increase in greenhouses gases has impacts on weather patterns, droughts, heat waves, wildfires, ocean acidification, sea level rise, glacial melting, average global temperatures, extinction of species, and so forth.

=== Sources of greenhouse gases ===
Carbon dioxide enters the atmosphere through the mass burning of fossil fuels such as coal, natural gas, and oil along with trees, solid waste, and biological materials. In 2018, carbon dioxide was estimated to approximately be 81% of all USA greenhouse gases emitted in 2018. Natural sinks and reservoirs absorb carbon dioxide emissions through a process called the carbon cycle. Sinks and reservoirs can include the ocean, forests and vegetation, and the ground.

Methane is mainly produced by livestock and agricultural practices. Methane was estimated to make up 10% of emitted greenhouse gases. From the decrease in non-agricultural GHG emissions during COVID-19, the percent of the USA's GHG emissions from livestock increased from 2.6% to about 5%, which is a smaller percentage than many other countries likely because the USA has more greenhouse gas emissions from vehicles, machines, and factories. Nitrous oxide is a greenhouse gas produced mainly by agriculture. Fluorinated gases are synthetically produced and used as substitutes for stratospheric ozone-depleting substances.

Greenhouse gases are produced from a wide variety of human activities, though some of the greatest impacts come from burning fossil fuels, deforestation, agriculture and industrial manufacturing. In the United States, power generation was the largest source of emissions for many years, but in 2017, the transportation sector overtook it as the leading emissions source. As of that year, the breakdown was transportation at 29%, followed by electricity generation at 28% and industry at 22%.

After carbon dioxide, the next most abundant compound is methane, though there have been methodological differences in how to measure its effects. According to a 2016 study, US methane emissions were underestimated by the EPA for at least a decade, by some 30 to 50 percent.

Another area of concern is that of ozone-depleting substances such as chlorofluorocarbons (CFCs) and hydrofluorocarbons (HFCs), which are often potent greenhouse gases with serious global warming potential (GWP). However, significant progress has been made in reducing the usage of these gases as a result of the Montreal Protocol, the international treaty that took effect in 1989.

=== Major emissions-creating events ===
In February 2018, an explosion and blowout in a natural gas well in Belmont County, Ohio was detected by the Copernicus Sentinel-5P satellite's Tropospheric Monitoring Instrument. The well was owned by XTO Energy. About 30 homes were evacuated, and brine and produced water were discharged into streams flowing into the Ohio River. The blowout lasted 20 days, releasing more than 50,000 tons of methane into the atmosphere. The blowout leaked more methane than is discharged by most European nations in a year from their oil and gas industries.

Per person, the United States generates carbon dioxide at a far faster rate than other primary regions.

Since 2000, rising CO_{2} emissions in China and the rest of world have eclipsed the output of the United States and Europe.

=== Reporting requirement ===
Reporting of greenhouse gases was first implemented on a voluntary basis with the creation of a federal register of greenhouse gas emissions authorized under Section 1605(b) of the Energy Policy Act of 1992. This program provides a means for utilities, industries, and other entities to establish a public record of their emissions and the results of voluntary measures to reduce, avoid, or sequester GHG emission

In 2009, the United States Environmental Protection Agency established a similar program mandating reporting for facilities that produce 25,000 or more metric tons of carbon dioxide per year. This has resulted in thousands of US companies monitoring and reporting their greenhouse gas emissions, covering about half of all GHG emissions in the United States.

A separate inventory of fossil fuel CO_{2} emissions is provided by Project Vulcan, a NASA/DOE funded effort to quantify North American fossil fuel emissions over time.

== Mitigation ==
=== Federal Policies ===
The United States government has held shifting attitudes toward addressing greenhouse gas emissions. The George W. Bush administration opted not to sign the Kyoto Protocol, but the Obama administration entered the Paris Agreement. The Trump administration withdrew from the Paris Agreement while increasing the export of crude oil and gas, making the United States the largest producer.

In 2021, the Biden administration committed to reducing emissions to half of 2005 levels by 2030. In 2022, President Biden signed the Inflation Reduction Act into law, which is estimated to provide around $375 billion over 10 years to fight climate change. As of 2022 the social cost of carbon is 51 dollars a tonne whereas academics say it should be more than three times higher.

==== Carbon neutrality ====
Reducing U.S. greenhouse gas emissions to the point where carbon emissions are neutral compared to the absorption of carbon dioxide is often called "net zero". Like the European Union, and countries worldwide, the United States has implemented carbon neutrality measures and law reform at both federal and state levels:

- The Biden Administration had set a goal of reducing carbon emissions by 50% to 52% compared to 2005 levels by 2030, a carbon free power sector by 2035, and for the entire economy to be net zero by 2050.
- By April 2023, 22 states, plus Washington DC and Puerto Rico had set legislative or executive targets for clean power production.
- All cars or light vehicles will have zero emissions (i.e. no internal combustion engine with gas or diesel) by 2035 in light duty vehicles, and no longer be bought by federal government by 2027.
- The California Air Resources Board voted in 2022 to draft new rules banning gas furnaces and water heaters, and requiring zero emission appliances in 2030. By 2022, four states have gas bans in new buildings.

===== Federal policies and legislation =====
Federal action plays a pivotal role in the U.S. approach to carbon neutrality, influencing energy systems, transportation, and industrial emission through a mic of legislative and executive tools.

The U.S. federal government has implemented several major policies to advance carbon neutrality, primarily through legislation, regulations, and executive actions. The Inflation Reduction Act (IRA) of 2022 is the most significant climate law in U.S. history, allocating $369 billion to clean energy and emissions reduction. It includes tax credits for renewable energy projects, electric vehicles, and carbon capture technology, aiming to cut U.S. greenhouse gas emissions by 40% below 2005 levels by 2030. Independent analyses suggest the IRA could reduce emissions by up to 42% by 2030 if fully implemented. A 2025 peer-reviewed study highlights the IRA's role in accelerating sustainable energy transitions, particularly through green hydrogen development, which could contribute to reducing global CO_{2} emissions by up to 6 gigatons when combined with other clean energy initiatives.

Prior to the IRA, the Clean Power Plan (2015) was a key Obama-era policy to reduce emissions from power plants, but it was repealed in 2019. In 2022, the Supreme Court limited the EPA's authority to regulate power plant emissions in West Virginia v. EPA, though the agency retains some power to set standards. The Biden administration has since proposed new rules requiring coal and gas plants to adopt carbon capture or shut down by 2040.

Federal agencies are also working toward carbon neutrality. In 2021, President Biden signed Executive Order 14057, mandating that the federal government achieve net-zero emissions by 2050. This includes transitioning to 100% carbon-free electricity by 2030 and electrifying the federal vehicle fleet. As of 2024, the Department of Defense - the largest federal energy consumer — plans to increase renewable energy use; specific targets are outlined in its Climate Adaptation Plan.

Despite these efforts, challenges remain. The U.S. Energy Information Administration (EIA) projects that fossil fuels will still provide about 60% of U.S. electricity in 2050 under current policies. Legal battles and shifting political priorities could also delay implementation. For example, some IRA tax credits face opposition in Congress, and future administrations could roll back regulations. While these initiatives mark historic progress, their long term success will depend on sustained political commitment, robust legal frameworks, and technological scalability.

After returning to office in January 2025, the Trump administration launched a sweeping and multi-pronged rollback of U.S. climate policy. On his first day, President Trump initiated the process to withdraw from the Paris Agreement for a second time, with the formal exit taking effect on January 27, 2026. He went further by issuing a presidential memorandum in November 2025 ordering withdrawal from the United Nations Framework Convention on Climate Change (UNFCCC), making the U.S. the first country ever to exit the foundational climate treaty.

Domestically, the administration moved to dismantle emissions regulations and expand fossil fuel production. The Environmental Protection Agency (EPA) proposed eliminating the Greenhouse Gas Reporting Program (GHGRP) and revoked billions of dollars in climate grants previously disbursed under the Inflation Reduction Act. This freeze was upheld by a federal appeals court in September 2025, with the court ruling that district courts lacked jurisdiction over the contract-based dispute. Simultaneously, the Interior Department unveiled a five-year plan to open nearly 1.3 billion acres of coastal waters to oil and gas drilling, including areas off California, Florida, and Alaska's High Arctic that had previously been protected for decades.

In 2025, Trump also invoked presidential authority under the Clean Air Act to grant exemptions to industrial polluters. He issued executive orders postponing compliance deadlines for hundreds of facilities—including chemical manufacturers and coke ovens—on the grounds of national security and technology availability. These actions collectively prioritized fossil fuel expansion and deregulation, establishing a legal and procedural posture that unraveled the previous administration's framework for achieving carbon neutrality.

===== List of state clean electricity laws =====
The following is a list of measures to move to clean electricity in 22 states, plus Washington DC and Puerto Rico, dates, and the details of their laws.

State	Measure	Latest date	Details
California	100% carbon-free electricity	2045	2018 legislation (SB 100) extended and expanded the existing state RPS. State agencies are required to submit implementation plans by January 1, 2021. In 2018, Gov. Jerry Brown's Executive Order B-55-18 set a goal of statewide carbon neutrality by no later than 2045, with net negative GHG emissions thereafter.
Colorado	100% carbon-free electricity for Xcel Energy	2050	A 2019 law (SB 19-236) codified a pledge previously made by Xcel, whose service territory covers approximately 60% of the state's load. It is mandatory "so long as it is technically and economically feasible."
Connecticut	100% carbon-free electricity	2040	Governor Ned Lamont's 2019 Executive Order (Number 3) set a 2040 goal for carbon-free electricity and asked the Department of Energy and Environmental Protection to develop a decarbonization plan for the power sector, in line with previous legislation to cut economy-wide carbon emissions by 80% below 2001 levels by 2050. In May 2022, Senate Bill 10, An Act Concerning Climate Change Mitigation, placed the goal into law.
District of Columbia	100% renewable energy through the RPS	2032	The Clean Energy DC Omnibus Amendment Act of 2018 (DC Act 22-583) amended the existing RPS to mandate 100% renewable electricity by the year 2032.
Hawaii	100% renewable energy through the RPS	2045	2015 legislation (HB623) made Hawaii the first state to set a 100% RPS for the electricity sector.
Illinois	100% clean energy	2050	2021 legislation (SB2408) established a goal of 100% clean energy by 2050, with interim targets of 40% by 2030 and 50% by 2040.
Louisiana	Net zero greenhouse gas emissions	2050	Governor John Bel Edwards' 2020 Executive Order (JBE 2020–18) established a Climate Initiatives Task Force to develop a roadmap and make recommendations.
Maine	100% clean energy	2050	2019 legislation (LD 1494) increased Maine's RPS to 80% by 2030, and set a goal of 100% by 2050. Also LD1679 sets an economy-wide goal of 80% cuts to greenhouse gases by 2050.
Maryland	Net-zero greenhouse gas emissions	2045	The General Assembly enacted the Climate Solutions Now Act of 2022. This wide-ranging legislation includes the 2045 net-zero goal.
Massachusetts	Net-zero greenhouse gas emissions	2050	In 2020, the Secretary of Energy and Environmental Affairs set a 2050 net-zero GHG emissions goal under the authority of 2008 legislation. The same goal was then included in a March 2021 climate action law (Bill S.9). A decarbonization roadmap was released at the end of 2020.
Michigan	Economy-wide carbon neutrality	2050	Governor Gretchen Whitmer's order in 2020 (Executive Directive 2020–10) set a goal "to achieve economy-wide carbon neutrality no later than 2050." It directed the Department of Environment, Great Lakes, and Energy to develop a plan by the end of 2021.
Minnesota	100% carbon-free electricity	2040	2023 legislation (SF 4) requires electric utilities to get 100% of the electricity they sell from carbon-free sources by 2040, including renewables and nuclear power. There are interim targets of 80% carbon-free power in 2030 and 90% in 2035. The legislation also increases the state's Renewable Energy Standard to 55% by 2035.
Nebraska	Net-zero carbon emissions from generation resources for Nebraska Public Power District and Omaha Public Power District	2050	Nebraska is the only state served solely by publicly owned utilities. As of December 2021, the three public utilities that serve the vast majority of customers have all adopted 100% clean energy goals. 2040 target for Lincoln Electric System.
Nevada	100% carbon-free electricity	2050	2019 legislation (SB 358) raised the RPS to 50% by 2030, and set a goal of a net-zero emission power sector by 2050.
New Jersey	100% carbon-free electricity	2035	Governor Phil Murphy's Executive Order 315 in 2023 set a goal of ensuring 100% of energy sold in the state comes from clean sources by 2035 and directed BPU to develop an updated Energy Master Plan by 2024.
New Mexico	100% carbon-free electricity	2045	2019 legislation (SB 489) requires utilities to have a zero-carbon power supply by 2045, including at least 80% from renewables, with the exception of rural electric coops which have a 2050 target date.
New York	100% carbon-free electricity	2040	2019 legislation (S6599) requires zero-emissions electricity by 2040 and sets a goal of cutting all state GHGs 85% by 2050. A Climate Action Council will develop a plan.
North Carolina	Carbon neutrality in the electricity sector	2050	2021 legislation (HB 951) requires the North Carolina Utilities Commission to "take all reasonable steps" to achieve a 70% reduction in CO_{2} emissions from electric generating facilities in the state by 2030 and carbon neutrality by 2050. The 2022 Executive Order 246 sets an economy-wide target of net-zero emissions by "no later than 2050," sets a goal that half of new vehicle sales must be electric vehicles by 2030, incorporates environmental justice and equity into climate programs, and has other measures.
Oregon	Greenhouse gas emissions reduced 100 percent below baseline emissions	2040	2021 legislation (HB 2021) requires investor-owned utilities to reduce greenhouse gas emissions associated with the electricity they sell to 80 percent below baseline emissions levels by 2030, 90 percent below baseline emissions levels by 2035, and 100 percent below baseline emissions levels by 2040.
Puerto Rico	100% renewable energy for electricity	2050	2019 legislation (SB1121), the Public Energy Policy Law of Puerto Rico, set a timeline for reaching 100% renewable electricity by the year 2050.
Rhode Island	100% renewable energy electricity	2033	Governor Gina Raimondo's 2020 Executive Order (20-01) requires the Office of Energy Resources to "conduct economic and energy market analysis and develop viable policy and programmatic pathways" to meet 100% of statewide electricity deliveries with renewables by 2030. 2022 legislation (H7277 SUB A) updates the state's RPS to require 100% of RI's electricity to be offset by renewable production by 2033.
Virginia	100% carbon-free electricity for Dominion Energy	2045	The 2020 Virginia Clean Economy Act (House Bill 1526 and Senate Bill 851) requires zero-carbon utilities by 2050 at the latest. 2050 for Appalachian Power Company.
Washington	100% zero-emissions electricity	2045	2019's Clean Energy Transformation Act (SB5116) applies to all utilities. The state Commerce Department started a rulemaking process in August 2019. Utilities must file implementation plans by January 2022.
Wisconsin	100% carbon-free electricity	2050	Governor Tony Evers' Executive Order (EO38) in 2019 directed a new Office of Sustainability and Clean Energy to "achieve a goal" of all carbon-free power by 2050.

===== Phase out of fossil fuel transport =====
California in 2020 set a 2035 target for all passenger vehicles and light-duty trucks to cease emissions. Connecticut, Massachusetts, New Jersey, New York State, North Carolina, Rhode Island, Vermont also have laws for 2035.

Maine, Oregon, and Washington have laws for 2030.

===== Phase out of gas furnaces =====
As of 2026 a New York ban on gas appliances in new buildings has been delayed due to a court case.

==== Cross-sectoral ====
- State and Local Climate and Energy Program
- Federal Energy Management Program

==== Transportation ====
The transportation sector accounted for nearly 29% of GHG emissions in the United States in 2019, with 58% of emissions coming from light-duty vehicles. As of 2021, states lack legislation for low emission zones. Programs to reduce greenhouse gas emissions from the transportation sector include:

- The Corporate Average Fuel Economy (CAFE) Program: Requires automobile manufacturers to meet average fuel economy standards for the light-duty vehicles, large passenger vans and SUVs sold in the United States. Fuel economy standards vary according to the size of the vehicle.
- SmartWay: Helps improve environmental outcomes for companies in the freight industry.
- Renewable Fuel Standard: Under the Energy Policy Act of 2005, United States Environmental Protection Agency is responsible for promulgating regulations to ensure that gasoline sold in the United States contains a specific volume of renewable fuel.
- FreedomCAR and Fuel Partnership and Vehicle Technologies Program: The program works jointly with DOE's hydrogen, fuel cell, and infrastructure R&D efforts and the efforts to develop improved technology for hybrid electric vehicles, which include components (such as batteries and electric motors). The U.S. government uses six "criteria pollutants" as indicators of air quality: ozone, carbon monoxide, sulfur dioxide, nitrogen oxides, particulate matter, and lead and does not include carbon dioxide and other greenhouse gases.
- Clean Cities: A network of local coalitions created by DOE in 1993 that works to support energy efficiency and clean fuel efforts in local transportation contexts.
- Congestion Mitigation and Air Quality Improvement (CMAQ) Program: Provides funds to states to improve air quality and congestion through the implementation of surface transportation projects (e.g., traffic flow and public transit improvements).
- Aviation industry regulation: Emissions from commercial and business jets make up 10% of U.S. transportation sector emissions and 3% of total national GHG emissions. In 2016, the EPA issued an "endangerment finding" that allowed the agency to regulate aircraft emissions, and the first proposed standards under that legal determination were issued in July 2020.
- Developing alternative energy sources: The Department of Energy's Bioenergy Technologies Office (BETO) supports research into biofuels as part of that agency's efforts to reduce transportation-related GHG emissions.
- Diesel Emissions Reduction Act (DERA) Program: Provides grants for diesel emissions reduction projects and technologies.

==== Energy consumption, residential and commercial ====
As of 2020, buildings in the United States consume roughly 40% of the country's total electricity and contribute a similar percentage of GHG emissions.

- EPA and DOE Clean Energy Programs – Energy Star
- Commercial Building Integration
- Residential Building Integration
- Weatherization Assistance Program
- State Energy Program

==== Energy consumption, industrial ====
- Energy Star for industry
- Industrial Technologies Program (ITP)

==== Energy supply ====
Total wind+solar electricity generation now exceeds coal-based energy in the U.S.

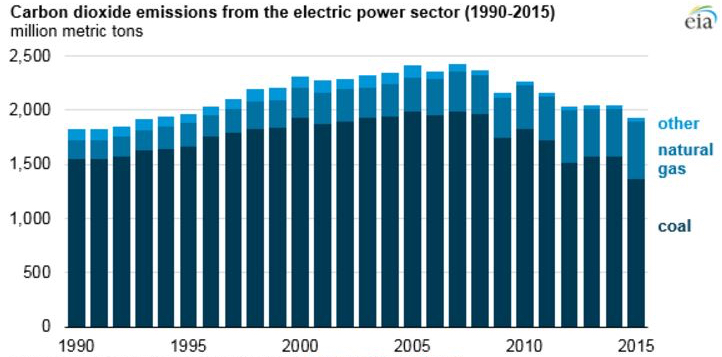
CO_{2} emissions from the US electric power sector

- The Coalbed Methane Outreach Program (CMOP) works to reduce methane released into the atmosphere as a result of coal mining by supporting recovery of naturally occurring coal mine gases and encouraging the production of coalbed methane energy, among other uses.
- Natural Gas STAR Program
- The government also supports alternative energy sources that do not rely on fossil fuels, including wind power, solar power, geothermal power, and biofuel.
- These clean energy sources can often be integrated into the electric grid in what are known as distributed generation systems.
- EPA Clean Energy Programs - Green Power Partnership
- EPA Clean Energy Programs - Combined Heat and Power Partnership
- Carbon capture and storage Research Program
  - Advanced Energy Systems Program
  - CO_{2} Capture
  - CO_{2} Storage

==== Agriculture ====
- Environmental Quality Incentives Program
- Conservation Reserve Program
- Conservation Security Program
- AgSTAR Program

==== Forestry ====
- Healthy Forests Initiative
- Forest Land Enhancement Program

==== Waste management ====
- The Landfill Methane Outreach Program (LMOP) promotes the use of landfill gas, a naturally occurring byproduct of decaying landfill waste, as a sustainable energy source. Besides reducing emissions, landfill gas utilization has also been credited for reductions in air pollution, improvements to health and safety conditions, and economic benefits for local communities.
- In addition to reducing emissions from waste already in landfills, the EPA's WasteWise program works with businesses to encourage recycling and source reduction to keep waste out of landfills in the first place.

=== Regional initiatives ===
- Western Climate Initiative
- The Regional Greenhouse Gas Initiative (RGGI), founded in 2007, is a state-level emissions capping and trading program by nine northeastern U.S. states: Connecticut, Delaware, Maine, Maryland, Massachusetts, New Hampshire, New York, Rhode Island, Vermont, and Virginia. It is a cap and trade program in which states "sell nearly all emission allowances through auctions and invest proceeds in energy efficiency, renewable energy and other consumer benefit programs."
- Western Governors Association Clean and Diversified Energy Initiative
- Powering the Plains
- Carbon Sequestration Regional Partnerships
- U.S. Mayors Climate Protection Agreement
- National Governors Association's (NGA) Securing a Clean Energy Future.

=== State Policies ===
==== California ====
- Vehicle Air Pollution (Senate Resolution 27): States and implies that California does not have to adhere to cutbacks in federal emissions standards, thereby allowing stricter California emissions standards than the federal government. This Senate Resolution stems from the previous administration's efforts to reverse environmental policies, and in this case, vehicle emissions standards. California's authority to set its own emissions standards is allowed through California's Clean Air Act preemption waiver granted to the state by the EPA in 2009. California's waiver applies to vehicles made in 2009 and later. The previous state standard included a goal for certain vehicles to reach an average 35 miles per gallon. California saw a large decline in vehicle emissions from 2007 to 2013 but a rise in emissions following 2013, which can be attributed to different circumstances, some of which include population and employment growth, and increases in overall state GDP indicating more economic activity in the state.
- Cap-and-Trade Program: Market-based carbon pricing program that sets a statewide cap on emissions. This cap declines annually and applies to large emitters that account for over 80 percent of California's GHG emissions. The California Air Resources Board (CARB) creates an allowance for each ton of carbon dioxide emissions. The number of allowances decreases over time and incentivizes a flexible approach to emissions reduction through trading.
- Advanced Clean Cars: Addresses GHG emissions and criteria air pollutants in California through the Low-Emission Vehicle (LEV) regulation and the Zero-Emission Vehicle (ZEV) regulation. The LEV regulation establishes increasing emissions standards for passenger vehicles through model year 2025. The ZEV regulation requires vehicle manufacturers to sell a certain percentage of ZEVs and plug-in hybrids annually through 2025. The next iteration of this program for future model years is under development. 15 states have adopted the regulations under this program.
- Advanced Clean Cars II: Mandates a ban on the sale of internal combustion engine passenger vehicles, trucks, and SUVs starting in 2035, and mandates annual increases in ZEV sales targets from model year 2026 to 2035. California has adopted the regulation and New York announced that it would follow.
- Advanced Clean Trucks: Requires manufacturers of medium-and heavy-duty trucks to sell an increasing percentage of zero-emission trucks each year starting with model year 2024. In addition to California, Oregon, Washington, New Jersey, New York, and Massachusetts have also adopted this regulation. 10 other states and the District of Columbia intend to adopt in the future.
- Low Carbon Fuel Standard (LCFS): Establishes annual targets through 2030 to ensure transportation-related fuels become cleaner and less carbon intensive. Oregon has a similar program entitled, Clean Fuels Program, which runs until 2025.
- In 2006, the state of California passed AB-32 (Global Warming Solutions Act of 2006), which requires California to reduce greenhouse gas emissions. To implement AB-32, the California Air Resources Board proposed a carbon tax but this was not enacted.
- In May 2008, the Bay Area Air Quality Management District, which covers nine counties in the San Francisco Bay Area, passed a carbon tax on businesses of 4.4 cents per ton of CO_{2}.

==== Colorado ====
In November 2006, voters in Boulder, Colorado, passed what is said to be the first municipal carbon tax. It covers electricity consumption with deductions for using electricity from renewable sources (primarily Xcel's WindSource program). The goal is to reduce their emissions by 7% below 1990 levels by 2012. Tax revenues are collected by Xcel Energy and are directed to the city's Office of Environmental Affairs to fund programs to reduce emissions.

Boulder's Climate Action Plan (CAP) tax was expected to raise $1.6 million in 2010. The tax was increased to a maximum allowable rate by voters in 2009 to meet CAP goals. As of 2017 the tax was set at $0.0049 /kWh for residential users (avg. $21 per year), $0.0009/kWh for commercial (avg. $94 per year), and $0.0003 /kWh for industrial (avg. $9,600 per year). Tax revenues were expected to decrease over time as conservation and renewable energy expand. The tax was renewed by voters on 6 November 2012.

As of 2015, the Boulder carbon tax was estimated to reduce carbon output by over 100,000 tons per year and provided $1.8 million in revenue. This revenue is invested in bike lanes, energy-efficient solutions, rebates, and community programs. The surcharge has been generally well received.

==== Maryland ====
In May 2010, Montgomery County, Maryland, passed the nation's first county-level carbon tax. The legislation required payments of $5 per ton of CO_{2} emitted from any stationary source emitting more than a million tons of carbon dioxide per year. The only source of emissions fitting the criteria is an 850 megawatt coal-fired power plant then owned by Mirant Corporation. The tax was expected to raise between $10 million and $15 million for the county, which faced a nearly $1 billion budget gap.

The law directed half of tax revenues toward low interest loans for county residents to invest in residential energy efficiency. The county's energy supplier buys its energy at auction, requiring the plant owner to sell its energy at market value, preventing any increase in energy costs. In June 2010, Mirant sued the county to stop the tax. In June 2011 the Federal Court of Appeals ruled that the tax was a fee imposed "for regulatory or punitive purposes" rather than a tax, and therefore could be challenged in court. The County Council repealed the fee in July 2012.

==== GHG reduction targets ====
- States with statutory GHG reduction targets: California, Colorado, Connecticut, Hawaii, Maryland, Maine, Minnesota, Massachusetts, New Jersey, New York, Nevada, Oregon, Rhode Island, Vermont, Virginia, and Washington.
- States that don't have statutory targets, but have statutory GHG reporting requirements: Iowa and Pennsylvania.

==== Renewable portfolio standards ====
- 38 states have established renewable portfolio standards or voluntary targets, which increase the share of renewable electricity generation over time.

==== Lead by example programs ====
- New Hampshire's Better Buildings Neighborhood Program
- New Jersey's Clean Energy Program
- Atlanta's Virginia Highland - 1st Carbon Neutral Zone in the United States

=== Local programs ===
Municipal, county, and regional governments have substantial influence on greenhouse gas emissions, and many have reduction goals and programs. Local governments are often one of the largest employers in their jurisdictions, and can achieve substantial reductions in their own operations, such as by using zero-emissions vehicles, making government buildings energy-efficient, making or buying renewable energy, and providing incentives for employees to walk, bike, or take transit to work. Local governments have control over several policy areas which influence emissions for the population as a whole. These include land use regulations such as zoning; transportation infrastructure like public transit, parking, and bike lanes; and building codes and efficiency regulations. Some municipalities act as utility cooperatives and set a minimum standard for renewable generation. Although healthier air is the main benefit of clean air zones in cities they can have a side effect of reducing greenhouse gas emissions: however as of 2025 it is unclear whether cities in the US have the political power to make clean air zones.

== Non-governmental responses ==
=== Individual action ===
Actions taken by individuals on climate change include diet, travel alternatives, household energy use, reduced consumption and family size. Individuals can also engage in local and political advocacy around issues of climate change. Individuals have a variety of carbon offsetting options available to mitigate their environmental impact through non-profit organizations.

=== Business community ===
Numerous large businesses have started cutting emissions and committed to eliminate net emissions by various dates in the future, resulting in higher demand for renewable energy and lower demand for fossil fuel energy. Businesses may also go carbon neutral by enrolling in Carbonfree® Programs or certifying their products as Carbonfree® through carbon offset organizations.

=== Technologies in development ===
- Carbon Sequestration Regional Partnerships
- Nuclear Hydrogen Initiative
- Hydrogen Technology
- High-temperature superconductivity

== See also ==
- Fossil fuel phase-out
- Phase-out of fossil fuel vehicles
- Phase-out of gas boilers
- Plastic bans
- Montreal Protocol
- Climate Registry
- Coal in the United States
- Energy conservation in the United States
- Greenhouse gas emissions in Kentucky
- List of U.S. states by carbon dioxide emissions
- Plug-in electric vehicles in the United States
- Politics of global warming
- Regulation of greenhouse gases under the Clean Air Act
- Select Committee on Energy Independence and Global Warming
- U.S. Climate Change Science Program
- List of coal-fired power stations in the United States
- List of natural gas-fired power stations in the United States
