= National Clean Energy Business Plan Competition =

The National Clean Energy Business Plan Competition (NCEBPC) is a U.S. Department of Energy (DOE) program in six regions in the United States in Building Technologies, Advanced Manufacturing, Vehicle Technologies, Federal Energy Management Program, Weatherization and Intergovernmental, Biomass Program, Geothermal Technologies, Fuel Cells Technologies, Solar Energy Technologies and Wind and Hydropower Technologies, as recognized by the Office of Energy Efficiency and Renewable Energy.

== Background ==
It was launched in 2011, with Obama Administration's Startup America Initiative, a White House campaign to inspire and promote entrepreneurship. Each regional winner receives DOE prize money and a chance to compete for a National Grand Prize at a competition held in Washington, D.C.

In the competition, student ventures the top U.S. universities form a complete business plan that commercializes a technology developed at their school or one of the National Labs. Venture teams are rank the plans on their clean energy impact, solution creativity, execution and financial strategy, market and customer knowledge, and team composition, chemistry and commitment.

=== Regions ===
- MIT Clean Energy Prize at Massachusetts Institute of Technology
- First Look West at Caltech
- Cleantech New Venture Challenge at the University of Colorado Boulder
- Clean Energy Student Challenge at Clean Energy Trust
- DOE Clean Energy Prize - Rice Business Plan Competition at Rice University
- ACC Clean Energy Challenge at University of Maryland
