= ESPC =

ESPC may refer to:

- Edinburgh Solicitors Property Centre
- Embroidery Software Protection Coalition
- Email Sender and Provider Coalition
- Energy Savings Performance Contract
- Ethio-Swedish Pediatric Clinic
- European Science Photo Competition
- European SharePoint Conference
