= GovEnergy =

The GovEnergy Workshop and Trade Show is an annual training event in the United States for federal facility energy professionals. The event is also attended by private industry professionals who help to monitor and control energy use in federal facilities.

GovEnergy is sponsored by seven federal agencies; the U.S. Department of Energy's (DOE) Federal Energy Management Program (FEMP), the U.S. General Services Administration (GSA), the U.S. Department of Veterans Affairs (VA), the U.S. Department of Defense (DOD), the U.S. Department of Homeland Security (DHS), the U.S. Environmental Protection Agency (EPA), and the U.S. Department of Agriculture (USDA). The federal government is the largest consumer of energy nationwide. As a result, the federal government has an obligation to "lead by example" by maintaining energy efficient facilities. Federal legislation such as the Energy Policy Act of 2005, Executive Order 13423, and EISA 2007. detail the requirements for reducing building energy costs, increasing energy efficiency, using renewable energy, and water conservation.

== History ==
The event originated in 1997, under the name 'Energy'. The name was changed to GovEnergy in 2007. GovEnergy is held in a different city every year. Previous locations have included Lake Buena Vista, Florida, Rochester, New York, Long Beach, California, Chicago, Illinois, New Orleans, Louisiana, Phoenix, Arizona, Providence, Rhode Island, and Dallas, Texas.

== Activities ==
The training sessions are organized by a series of themed categories, commonly known as tracks. Previous tracks have included building operations & maintenance (O&M), contracting, energy security, project financing, greenhouse gases, legislation, energy management controls systems (EMCS), renewable energy, specialty buildings, sustainability, technology, and water efficiency. The majority of the tracks feature nine sessions, and are held over the course of two and a half days. The tracks and individual sessions have been designed to meet the needs of "federal facility managers, federal energy coordinators, and federal procurement officials.”. The sessions are taught by professionals representing both the public and private sectors. GovEnergy also features a mid-size trade show and a series of educational tours.
