= South Carolina Hydrogen & Fuel Cell Alliance =

- Company type: Non-Profit
- Founded: 2006
- Headquarters: Columbia, S.C., United States
- Key people: Shannon Baxter-Clemmons, Executive Director

The South Carolina Hydrogen & Fuel Cell Alliance (SCHFCA) is a Public-private collaborative with a mission of advancing the commercialization of hydrogen fuel cell technologies in the state of South Carolina. Government entities, in particular, the Department of Energy has funded SCHFCA with $188,788 for a hydrogen education program for state and local officials. State taxpayers have already chipped in $12.3 million for hydrogen fuel cell development, while other non-state entities like federal and private sources have invested nearly $115 million into the development of the technology.

== Founding organizations ==
SCHFCA was founded in 2006 by six core institutions that were devoted to Hydrogen & Fuel Cell initiatives and development.

- University of South Carolina
- Clemson University
- Applied Research Center: Hydrogen
- Savannah River National Laboratory
- The South Carolina Department of Commerce
- South Carolina State University.

== Affiliate members ==
- SCRA
- South Carolina Energy Office
- EngenuitySC
- Greenway Energy LLC
- South Carolina Fire Marshal's Office
- NSF Industry/University Cooperative Research Center for Fuel Cells
- Palmetto State Clean Fuel Coalition
- South Carolina Technical College System

== See also ==
- National Hydrogen Association
- United States Department of Energy
- Savannah River Site
