= FEMP =

FEMP may refer to:

- Federal Energy Management Program, United States
- Spanish Federation of Municipalities and Provinces (Federación Española de Municipios y Provincias)
