= HPC4EI =

The High Performance Computing for Energy Innovation (HPC4EI) is a U.S. Department of Energy (DOE) initiative that leverages supercomputing resources from DOE national laboratories to support industry partnerships in advancing energy-efficient manufacturing, materials development, and decarbonisation technologies. Launched in 2015, it serves as the umbrella program for two key sub-programs: High Performance Computing for Manufacturing (HPC4Mfg) and High Performance Computing for Materials (HPC4Mtls). The program aims to reduce industrial emissions, optimize energy use, and accelerate clean energy innovations by providing access to advanced modeling, simulation, and data analysis tools.

== Background ==
HPC4EI was established to bridge the gap between industry needs and DOE's high-performance computing (HPC) capabilities, enabling small- and medium-sized manufacturers to tackle complex challenges without significant upfront investment in computing infrastructure. Managed by Lawrence Livermore National Laboratory (LLNL) on behalf of DOE's Office of Energy Efficiency and Renewable Energy (EERE) and Office of Fossil Energy and Carbon Management (FECM), the initiative has funded over 169 projects totalling more than $50 million as of 2024.

The program conducts biannual solicitations (spring and fall) for collaborative projects, with industry partners contributing at least 20% of costs through in-kind resources. Projects typically last 12–18 months and utilize supercomputers at labs like Argonne, Oak Ridge, and Sandia.

== Sub-programs ==
HPC4EI encompasses two focused sub-programs:

- High Performance Computing for Manufacturing (HPC4Mfg): Funded primarily by EERE's Advanced Materials and Manufacturing Technologies Office (AMMTO) and Industrial Efficiency and Decarbonization Office (IEDO), this sub-program targets improvements in manufacturing processes, lifecycle energy consumption, and efficiency of energy conversion/storage technologies. It supports projects in sectors like aerospace and clean energy production.
- High Performance Computing for Materials (HPC4Mtls): Sponsored by FECM, this sub-program applies HPC to strengthen the domestic materials supply chain for energy applications, such as carbon capture, clean hydrogen, and reduced material costs.

== Key Projects and Impact ==
HPC4EI has supported diverse initiatives, including:

- A 2023 collaboration between LLNL and Allegheny Technologies Incorporated (ATI) to develop "digital twins" for aerospace component manufacturing, optimizing near-net shape processes to reduce waste and energy use.
- FY22 awards totalling $3.9 million for 13 projects focused on decarbonization and manufacturing vitality.
- 2024 funding of $4 million for 10 projects, including LLNL-led efforts on carbon capture and CO_{2} reduction, projected to save 25 million gigajoules of energy annually and cut 86 million tons of CO_{2} emissions.

The program has driven innovations in energy efficiency, with projects at labs like Argonne accelerating clean energy technology development.

== Workshops and Outreach ==
HPC4EI hosts annual workshops to foster collaboration, such as the August 2024 event at LLNL to review operations and explore HPC applications in manufacturing. Earlier workshops, like the October 2023 gathering, gathered feedback from stakeholders to refine program strategies. Informational webinars accompany solicitations to guide applicants.

== See also ==
- High-performance computing
- United States Department of Energy
- Lawrence Livermore National Laboratory
- Clean energy
