= Energy Performance Investment =

An Energy Performance Investment is a funding solution that enables entities (the end beneficiary) to acquire Energy Conservation Measures (ECM) via a third party investor and pay for them from the financial value of the proven energy savings achieved using a pay-as-you-save mechanism.

This investment model is similar in principle to an Energy Performance Contract (EPC) but with the exception that no guarantees are made as to the level of energy savings. Instead under the EPI the financial value of the proven and verified energy savings from the invested solution are shared between the end beneficiary and the investor at a predefined ratio. The third party investment is not a loan or a lease.

One of the key benefits of the EPI investment mechanism to the end beneficiary is that they only pay a proportion of the value achieved resulting in a reduction in their energy costs. Should no financial saving be achieved then the end beneficiary has nothing to pay i.e. they make no capital investment and will never be worse off.

Typically the measurement of the financial savings achieved is performed by a party unrelated to all other parties involved in the arrangement in order to ensure independence.

The first EPI was performed by Decarbon Limited in 2012.

== See also ==
- Energy law
- Energy management
