= Roderick Jackson =

American engineer and inventor

Roderick Kinte Jackson
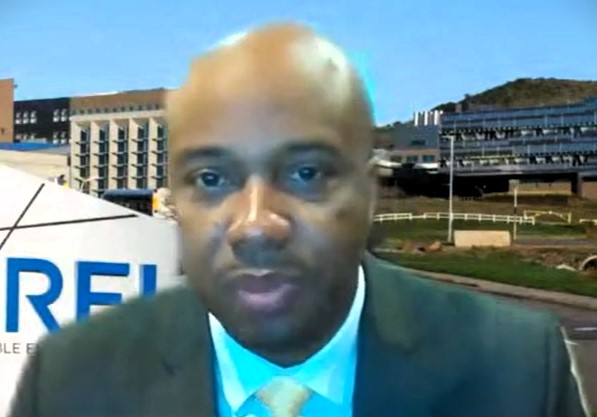
- Jackson speaks to the United States House Committee on Science, Space, and Technology in 2021
- Born: Canton, Mississippi
- Education: Georgia Institute of Technology
- Scientific career
- Workplaces: Oak Ridge National Laboratory; National Renewable Energy Laboratory
- Thesis: Development of single wall carbon nanotube transparent conductive electrodes for organic electronics (2009)

Roderick Jackson is an American engineer and inventor who is based at the National Renewable Energy Laboratory. Whilst working at the Oak Ridge National Laboratory, Jackson oversaw the demonstration of a fully 3D-printed house with solar panels that could wirelessly power a 3D-printed car.

== Early life and education ==
Jackson's father, Louis Jackson, built houses. Jackson recalls spending his childhood as a member of his father's construction business. His mother, Gwen Jackson, was involved with the Civil rights movement, and attended the March Against Fear where Martin Luther King Jr. delivered a speech in Canton, Mississippi. He grew up in Mississippi. He was awarded a Graduate Education for Minority Students (GEM) Fellowship, which inspired him to become an engineer. Jackson completed his studies at the Georgia Institute of Technology. After earning his undergraduate degree, he returned to Mississippi to help his father set up a construction company. He completed his graduate studies while running the business. He eventually returned to pursue doctoral research, where he explored carbon nanotubes for organic electronics.

== Career ==
In 2009, Jackson joined the Buildings Technology Research and Integration Center at the Oak Ridge National Laboratory (ORNL), where he was responsible for buildings and systems. He established Alabama's Smart Neighbourhood, the first project in the Southern United States that connected homes to a microgrid. He contributed to an Additive Manufacturing Project, AMIE, which demonstrated a 3D printed house that, using solar panels, could power a 3D printed vehicle. The house and car were printed with one of the largest 3D printers in the world, ORNL's Big Area Additive Manufacturing Machine. He created vacuum insulation panels that provided the same thermal insulation as commercially available materials at half the cost.

In 2017, Jackson joined National Renewable Energy Laboratory, where he is Program Manager for the Building Portfolio. At NREL, he was mentored by Johney Green, another GEM alumnus, who serves as Laboratory Director for Mechanical and Thermal Engineering Sciences. Jackson was appointed to the Advisory Board of the American Council for an Energy-Efficient Economy in 2021.

Jackson has acted as a mentor for young engineers and scientists through school robotics programs and the GEM Fellowship scheme.

== Awards and honors ==
- 2014 Knoxville Business Journal’s 40 under 40
- 2016 National GEM Consortium Alumni Member of the Year
- 2017 Young, Gifted & Empowered Awards Innovator of the Year
- 2022 Black Engineer of the Year Award Professional Achievement in Government Award
