= State Energy Program (United States) =

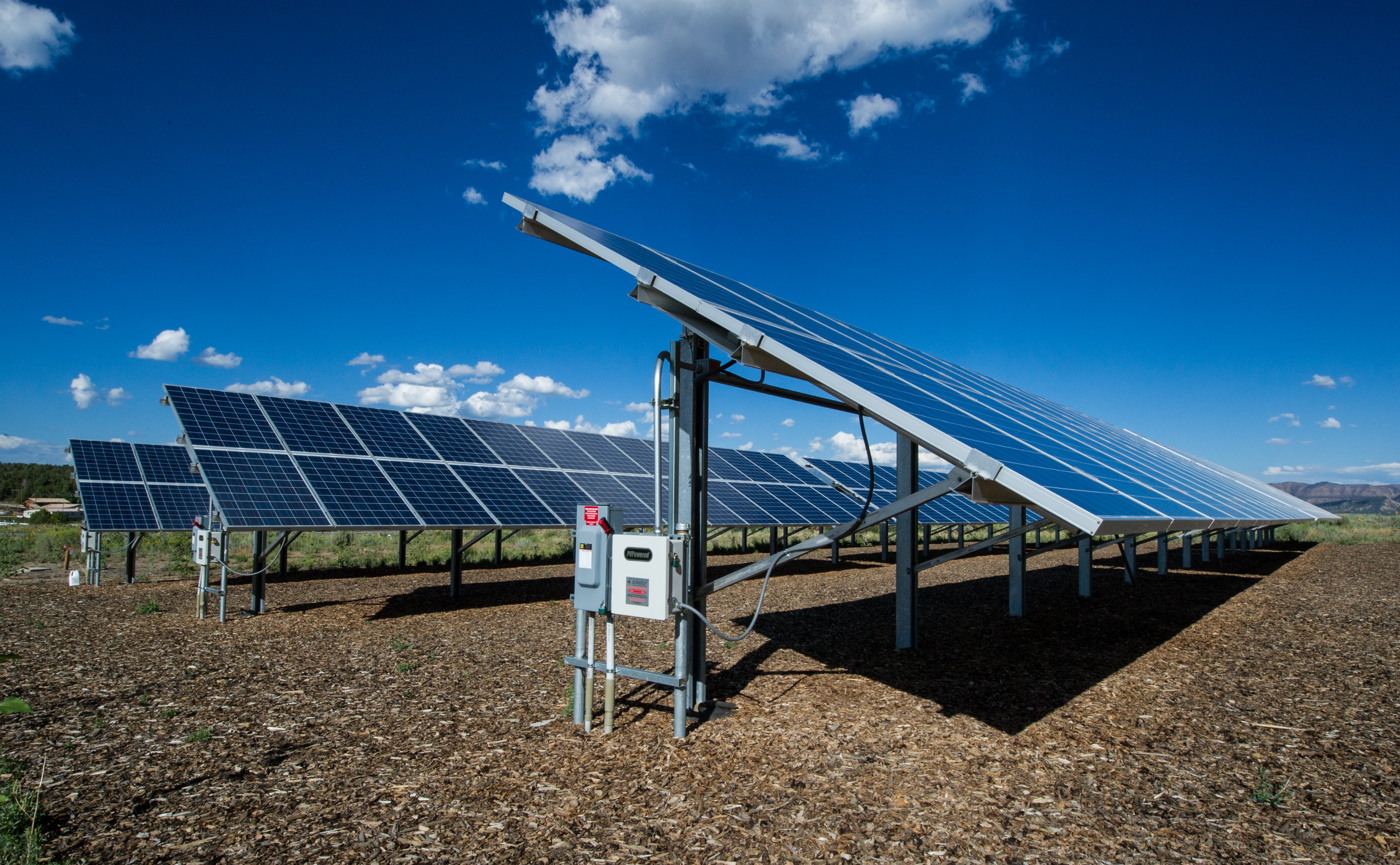
Solar panels are a common project that states use SEP funding on

The United States Department of Energy's State Energy Program (SEP) provides grants to states and directs funding to state energy offices from technology programs in Office of Energy Efficiency and Renewable Energy. States use grants to address their energy priorities and program funding to adopt emerging renewable energy and energy efficiency technologies. Started in 2010, the program "is the only program administered by the U.S. Department of Energy (DOE) that provides cost-shared resources directly to the states for allocation by the governor-designated State Energy Office for use in energy efficiency and clean energy innovation, development, and demonstration activities.”

The State Energy Program $3 billion funding will be used to provide rebates to consumers for home energy audits or other energy-saving improvements; to develop renewable energy; to promote Energy Star products; to upgrade the energy efficiency of state and local government buildings; and other innovative state efforts to help families save money on their energy bills. The energy efficiency upgrades are to be available for families making up to 200% of the federal poverty level.

== Program History ==
Originally the State Energy Conservation Program, the State Energy programs implementation was a result of the early 1970s energy crisis. The crisis brought attention to the United States’ dependence on foreign oil. As a result, new legislation was created to establish conservation programs and promote energy efficiency.

Legislation that formed SEP framework:

- The Energy Policy and Conservation Act of 1975 (P.L. 94–163)
- The Energy Conservation and Production Act of 1976 (P.L. 94–385)
- The Warner Amendment of 1983 (P.L. 95–105)
- The State Energy Efficiency Programs Improvement Act of 1990 (P.L. 101–440)
- The Energy Policy Act (EPAct) of 1992 (P.L. 102–486)
- The State Energy Efficiency Programs Improvement Act of 1990 (P.L. 101–440)
- The Energy Policy Act (EPAct) of 1992 (P.L. 102–486)

== Mission ==
The State Energy Program's main purpose is to provide funding and technical assistance to states, territories, and the District of Columbia. Each department's main goals are to increase energy efficiency while reducing energy costs and waste; as well as to achieve energy security, resiliency, and emergency preparedness plans. Promoting economic growth along with improved environmental quality rounds out the department's goals.

That State Energy program has provided states with $300 million in financial assistance since 2010. This financial support has led to The Installation of more tax 60,000 renewable energy systems. Energy efficiency upgrades in 20,000 buildings that have led to reduced energy waste. Education of more than 2 million people in performing energy audits and upgrades. The State Energy Program has created a space to help state and local governments create partnerships with energy efficiency and renewable energy resources. The resources are meant to develop financing mechanisms for institutional programs. Such As:

- Loan Program and Management
- Energy Saving Performance Contracting
- Transportation programs
- Residential programs for Homeowners

== Programs ==
All 56 states, territories, and the District of Columbia receive funding and technical assistance from the State Energy Program. (The following programs are a selection of programs and not a completed list.)

=== Alabama ===
The Energy Division of the Alabama Department of Economic and Community Affairs utilizes SEP funds to increase energy efficiency, reduce energy consumption, and promote market acceptance and deployment of energy-efficiency and renewable energy technologies throughout the state.

As of 2012 five loans have been executed: one to a yarn plant to install energy efficiency equipment in its manufacturing facilities expected to cut utility costs by 15%; another to fund improvements in a paper company's headquarters and sawmill operations and cut utility costs by 25% and 12%, respectively; another loan is being used to purchase and install energy efficient equipment in 118 K-12 schools with expected savings to surpass $1 million a year; Retrofits in Alabama Department of Corrections facilities are also being funded; Automotive Industrial Efficiency Program is working to help automotive supply chain companies to reduce energy consumption.

Alabama has received $7 million from the SEP since 2010. The funds have been used to create and retain 500 jobs. Over 6 million square feet of building space has been retrofitted in over 100 buildings. More than 20,000 people were newly trained in energy efficiency installations.

=== Alaska ===
Alaska has received $4 million from the SEP, helping them create 300 jobs and train 5,300 people in energy efficiency installations.

The Alaska Energy Authority (AEA) administers SEP-funded projects. In 2010 a $250 million revolving loan fund to support energy upgrades in public facilities was developed with a goal of increasing per capita energy efficiency by 15% by 2020. The AEA is also working to replace a total of eleven school buses with electric vehicles.

=== California ===
The California Energy Commission was created in 1974 and uses SEP funds to support its Appliance Efficiency Program. In the past ten years, California has received $26.2 million from the SEP. Approximately 1,800 jobs have been created or retained and 6,250 people have been trained in energy efficiency installations.

Appliance efficiency regulations have been adopted to replace computers and computer monitors, portable electric spas, light emitting diode (LED) and small diameter directional lamps, portable air conditioners, commercial and industrial air compressors, and spray sprinkler bodies with efficient versions. The replacement of theses products is set to save more than 6,800 GWh of electricity and over 150 billion gallons of water annually as well as cutting utility bill costs by approximately $2 billion per year.

=== District of Columbia ===
$2.8 million from the SEP have been designated to the District of Columbia. SEP funds are used by the Energy Office to benchmark energy use in libraries, schools, police stations, administrative offices, and other public buildings. As a result of these audits, retrofits in buildings were funded by the SEP. A 875,000 square foot government building at One Judiciary Square that houses 20 government agencies was one building that was retrofitted.

As part of the Better Buildings Challenge, Challenge partners in the District of Columbia saved over 72 trillion Btus of energy, $686 million, and 1.49 billion gallons of water in seven years.

=== Florida ===
SEP funds are designated by the Florida Department of Agriculture and Consumer Services. Since the program's start, Florida has received $13.6 million from the SEP helping to fund the creation of almost 1,000 jobs, the retrofitting of over 115,000 square feet of building space, and the training in energy efficiency installations of more than 500 people.

The Energy Efficient Retrofits for Public Facilities had $950,000 in SEP funds invested in it in 2014. This funding was awarded to 18 eligible local governments and nonprofit organizations to make energy efficient retrofits. Florida is also working to map the energy landscape at water and wastewater treatment facilities to gather data for the state in order to develop energy-saving programs in that sector.

=== Guam ===
Since 2010, the Guam Energy Office has used $2.1 million in SEP funds to create and retain 140 jobs and train over 11,000 people in energy efficiency installations. Guam uses funds to promote energy conservation and efficiency in support of outreach and education strategies. Guam also has a poster and essay college for students K-12 as part of education and outreach activities. In 2018 the theme was "Energy efficiency for a sustainable future."

=== Idaho ===
The Idaho Governor's Office of Energy and Mineral Resources has used SEP funds in the past ten years to create and retain 260 jobs and retrofit 7,700 feet of building space. Through the state's Government Leading by Example Program Idaho supports rural communities with energy-related resources and opportunities. Idaho has provided financial assistance to find beneficial energy upgrades to 39 local government buildings since 2014.

=== Iowa ===
Since 2010 Iowa has received $6.4 million from the SEP to help create and retain 460 jobs and train more than 2,300 people in energy efficiency installations. The Iowa Energy Office designates SEP funding. In 2016 the state of Iowa finished a state energy plan "to encourage growth in all of Iowa's energy sectors while emphasizing sustainable practices, economic development throughout the state, and support for research and development required to reach Iowa's goal of being on the leading edge of energy innovation." The plan includes initiatives such as the Iowa Biomass Conversion Action Plan and the Iowa Energy Storage Action Plan.

The Iowa Public Building Benchmarking Program allows users of the online benchmarking tool to identify buildings that are consuming more or less energy than expected and compare it to both different years and similar buildings. Once organizations identify buildings most in need of energy improvements, investments can be made to towards energy efficiency.

Iowa is ranked second nationally in wind produced energy with 2,5000 turbines across the state. The SEP provided funds that supported wind development which includes training and curriculum development. The SEP also supported a 2.5 megawatt turbine project for Kirkwood Community College.

=== New York ===
New York has received $23.4 million from the SEP which has helped to create and retain over 1,600 jobs, retrofit more than 5 million square feet of building space, and train approximately 10,000 people in energy efficiency installations since 2010. In 2018 the New York State Energy Research and Development Authority was awarded an $18.5 million grant to lead the National Offshore Wind Research and Development Consortium. The goals of the consortium include supporting innovations in wind plant design, developing methods for wind power resource and site characterization, and exploring technological solutions for operations, maintenance, and supply chain development.

In 2019, a plan was announced to promote energy storage in the state. The plan is estimated to help cut back on 1.5 gigawatts by 2025 and 2.0 gigawatts by 2030. The energy storage roadmap identifies near-term policies, regulations, and initiatives to help achieve the storage goals.

New York, along with Minnesota, Maryland, and the District of Columbia, worked to develop the Utility Energy Registry with Climate Action Associates. The platform allows access to energy demographics for the public to encourage state and local government's clean energy planning. The goal is to create a model that is replicable and nationally applicable to allow communities to make policies and progress in energy efficiency.

=== Puerto Rico ===
In ten years, Puerto Rico has received $4.7 million from the SEP. This money has gone towards creating and retaining more than 300 jobs, retrofitting over 64,000 square feet of building space, and training over 4,500 people in energy efficiency installations. Puerto Rico places a focus on promoting public awareness of conservation and energy efficiency efforts. Education efforts are made through social media, seminars, workshops, and trainings. Partnerships with schools are also utilized for education.

As of 2012, under the Building Energy Efficiency Retrofit program, nearly 70 businesses have been retrofitted saving a total of $7.2 million and the Traffic Signal Retrofit Program has replaced inefficient traffic lights with 7.875 watt LED lamps that save approximately 4,549,282 kWh and over $1 million annually.

=== Tennessee ===
Tennessee has received $9.1 million from the SEP since 2010. These funds have helped create and retain almost 700 jobs and train over 280,000 people in energy efficiency installations.

The Climate Registry and National Association of State Energy Officials along with Tennessee and five other states, created the framework for a National Energy Efficiency Registry. The platform is to collect data on savings associated with energy efficiency projects.

Tennessee adopted energy efficiency improvements in wastewater and water treatment facilities. Outdoor lighting projects were also included within chosen facilities. Along with Alabama, the changes made in Tennessee contribute to approximately 18 million saved kilowatt hours of energy annually and $1.6 million saved in annual energy costs.

== Impact ==
The State Energy Program partners with state and territory energy offices to collect annual benefits that come from the financial and technical assistance the program gives to states. States use SEP funding as a base then grow through the addition of their own funds or private sector investments.

A 2015 study by Oak Ridge National Laboratory found that for every dollar yielded to the State Energy Program by the federal government, it saved $4.50 in reduced energy bills. Other outcomes included "energy savings and renewable energy generation, bill savings, cost effectiveness, job creation, and carbon emissions reductions and avoided social costs associated with climate change." The study estimates total SEP-Attributable Energy Savings and SEP-Attributable Renewable generation from 2009–2050 to be approximately 2.8 quadrillion source British thermal units (820 TWh). 135,493 jobs are estimated to be created from 2009 to 2050 based on $1.9 billion in funding. Avoided carbon emissions from energy savings and renewable generation are 42.36 and 121.78 Million metric tons of carbon equivalent (MMTCE), respectively. The avoided social costs from energy savings and renewable generation are $3,057,196 and $8,854,015, respectively. From 2009 to 2050, in 2009 dollars, bill savings are estimated to be $7.8 billion in total.

== Recognition ==
The United States’ State Energy Program has received its recognition by providing vital technical assistance to states and territories in order to spread awareness and maximize the benefits of energy efficiency throughout the nation. The State Energy Program has been around for decades, developing its knowledge and expertise on how local and state governments can create new partnerships with supporting companies, while discovering new renewable resources to do so. As far as financing goes, this concept has allowed the State Energy Program to construct a financing plan for institutional retrofit programs; loan program and management; energy savings performance contracting; comprehensive residential programs for homeowners; transportation programs that accelerate use of alternative fuels; and renewable programs that remove barriers and support supply side and distributed renewable energy. Although this program was established in the late 70s, it is still not acknowledged by many states throughout the country due to poor environmental education.

== See also ==
- Greenhouse gas emissions by the United States
- United States Department of Energy
- Office of Energy Efficiency & Renewable Energy
- Climate Change
- Renewable Energy
- Solar Energy
