= FreedomCAR and Vehicle Technologies =

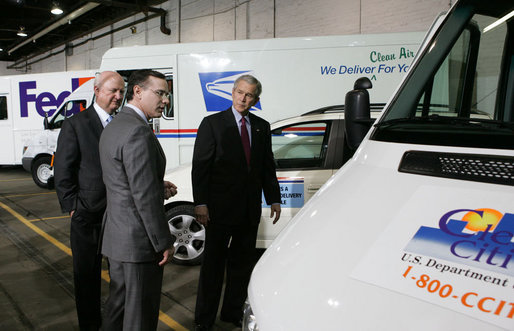
President George W. Bush and Secretary of Energy Sam Bodman listen to DaimlerChrysler´s Mark Chernoby describes the FedEx Pilot Program Plug-in Hybrid Sprinter during a visit to the US Postal Service

The FreedomCAR and Vehicle Technologies (FCVT) was a national Office of Energy Efficiency and Renewable Energy program developing more energy-efficient and environmentally-friendly highway transportation technologies to enable the United States to use less petroleum. Run by Michael Berube, it had long-term aims to develop "leap-frog" technologies to provide Americans with greater freedom of mobility and energy security, lower costs, and reduce environmental impacts.

== Office ==
The office of FreedomCAR and Vehicle Technologies (FCVT) was in the US Department of Energy.

== Clean Cities Program ==
The Clean Cities Program was part of the Office of Energy Efficiency and Renewable Energy's FreedomCAR & Vehicle Technologies Program.

Its mission was to advance the US economic, environmental, and energy security by supporting local decisions to adopt practices to contribute to the reduction of petroleum consumption. Clean Cities carried out that mission through a network of more than 80 volunteer coalitions, which developed public and private partnerships to promote alternative fuels and vehicles, fuel blends, fuel economy, hybrid vehicles, and idle reduction.

== Partnerships ==
The goal of the FreedomCAR and Fuel Partnership was the development of emission- and petroleum-free cars and light trucks. It focused on the high-risk research needed to develop the necessary technologies such as fuel cells and advanced hybrid propulsion systems to provide a full range of affordable cars and light trucks free of foreign oil and harmful emissions without sacrificing freedom of mobility and freedom of vehicle choice.

To address the research and development needs of commercial vehicles, the goal of the partnership was for US trucks and buses to move safely and cost-effectively larger volumes of freight and greater numbers of passengers but emit little or no pollution, with a dramatic reduction in dependence on imported petroleum.

== Plug-in hybrids ==
In 2007, the Department of Energy announced that it would invest nearly $20 million in research on plug-in hybrid electric vehicles (PHEV). They have the potential to displace a large amount of gasoline by delivering up to 40 miles of electric range without recharging, a distance that includes most daily roundtrip commutes. Five projects would be cost-shared with the United States Advanced Battery Consortium (USABC) to allow up to $38 million for battery research and development. Five lithium ion battery companies were selected for the projects:

- EnerDel, Inc. of Indianapolis, Indiana, selected for an award of up to $1.25 million from DOE (total DOE/industry cost share: $2.5 million) over two years to develop cells for 10- and 40-mile range PHEVs using nanophase lithium titanate coupled with a high voltage Nickel-Manganese cathode material;
- A123Systems of Watertown, Massachusetts; Compact Power Inc. in Michigan, selected for an award of up to $6.25 million from DOE (total DOE/industry cost share: $12.5 million) over three years for a project to develop batteries based on nanophase iron-phosphate chemistry for 10- and 40-mile range PHEVs;
- Compact Power Inc. of Troy, Michigan, selected for an award of up to $4.45 million from DOE (total DOE/industry cost share: $12.7 million) over three years to develop batteries for 10-mile range PHEVs using high energy and high power Manganese-spinel;
- 3M in Saint Paul, Minnesota, selected for an award of up to $1.14 million from DOE (total DOE/industry cost share: $ 2.28 million) over two years to screen nickel/manganese/cobalt (NMC) cathode materials through building and testing of small-sized cells;
- and Johnson Controls – Saft Advanced Power Solutions of Milwaukee, Wisconsin, selected for an award of up to $4.1 million from DOE (total DOE/industry cost-share: $8.2 million) over two years to develop batteries using a nickelate/layered chemistry for 10- and 40-mile range PHEVs.

The projects would focus on developing batteries and cells for 10- and 40-mile range PHEVs and building small cells to test new cathode materials.

In addition, the University of Michigan would receive nearly $2 million to explore the future of PHEVs in a two-year study conducted with DOE's Pacific Northwest National Laboratory (PNNL), General Motors, Ford Motor Company, and DTE Energy. The study would evaluate how PHEVs would share the power grid with other energy needs; monitor the American public's view of PHEVs and their driving behavior in such vehicles; assess the reduction of greenhouse gas emissions; and identify how automakers can optimize PHEV design to increase performance and reduce cost. See the DOE press release, the PNNL press release, and the Draft Plug-In Hybrid Electric Vehicle R&D Plan on the FreedomCAR and Vehicle Technologies Program website.

A number of other efforts also aimed to advance PHEV technologies. In early September, Google.org, the philanthropic arm of Google Inc., offered $10 million to for-profit companies that are working to advance PHEV technologies. Meanwhile, California's Pacific Gas and Electric Company (PG&E) announced that it was working with Tesla Motors to study the remote control of the charging of electric vehicles. Such "smart charging" could allow a utility to vary the electric charging load on its system in response to intermittent energy sources. In effect, electric vehicles would serve as a large energy storage system that utilities could direct energy to at times when ample supplies are available and the load on the electrical grid is low.

Also, DoE and China's Ministry of Science and Technology (MOST) signed a five-year agreement in September 2007 to support the large-scale deployment of electric and hybrid-electric vehicles in both countries.

== Criticisms ==
With the hydrogen-focused FCVT, whose goal is decades away, the George W. Bush administration was criticized for ignoring any intermediate-term solutions, and of funding it largely with monies redirected from other renewable-energy and energy-efficiency programs. As Ashok Gupta, the lead energy economist at the Natural Resources Defense Council, put it, "The FreedomCAR is really about Bush's freedom to do nothing about cars today."

== Reduction in 2010 funding ==
The Department of Energy's congressional budget request for 2010 budget cuts funding for fuel cell technologies by 60% to US$70 million. Secretary of Energy Steven Chu's presentation portrays this as "moving away from funding vehicular hydrogen fuel cells to technologies with more immediate promise."

== See also ==
- Air car
- Corporate Average Fuel Economy
- Michigan Memorial Phoenix Energy Institute
- Plug-in hybrid
- PHEV Research Center
- German National Platform for Electric Mobility
