= Department of Energy Organization Act =

- Long title: An act to establish a Department of Energy in the executive branch by the reorganization of energy functions within the Federal Government in order to secure effective management to assure a coordinated national energy policy, and for other purposes.
- Enacted by: the 95th United States Congress

Citations
- Statutes at Large: 91 Stat. 565

Legislative history
- Signed into law by President Jimmy Carter on July 27, 1977

Logo of the U.S. Energy Information Administration, an organization within the DOE.

The Department of Energy Organization Act is an act of Congress that establishes the US Department of Energy as a part of the executive branch of the United States government. This was accomplished by means of the other organizations in the Federal Government with energy functions directing these functions to the DOE. The transfer of functions was from those that had been vested in the Federal Energy Administration as well as those with the Energy Research and Development Administration.

== Functions ==
Section 203. (a) states there shall be eight Assistant Secretaries, to be appointed by the President, by and with the advice and consent of the Senate. The duties the Secretary of the DOE shall assign include, but are not limited, to the following:

- Energy resource applications
- Energy research and development functions
- Environmental responsibilities and functions
- International programs and international policy functions
- Intergovernmental policies and relations
- Energy industry competition and consumer affairs
- Nuclear waste management responsibilities
- Energy conservation functions.
- Power marketing functions, including responsibility for marketing and transmission of Federal power.
- Public and congressional relations functions

== Administrative Organizations within the DOE ==
Seal of the U.S. Federal Energy Regulatory Commission, an organization within the DOE.

The act had set forth the following administrative organizations to be administered by the DOE:

- Energy Information Administration
- Economic Regulatory Administration
- Federal Energy Regulatory Administration
