= Johney Green =

American scientist and researcher

Johney Boyd Green
- Born: Memphis, Tennessee
- Education: University of Memphis; Georgia Institute of Technology
- Scientific career
- Workplaces: Savannah River National Laboratory
- Thesis: Application of deterministic chaos theory to cyclic variability in spark-ignition engines (2000)

Johney Green is an American scientist who is the Laboratory Director of the Savannah River National Laboratory. His research considers additive manufacturing and renewable energy systems. He is Chairman of the National GEM Consortium.

== Early life and education ==
Green grew up in Memphis, Tennessee. Johney Green Sr, his father, attended Southern University on a scholarship. Green Sr joined the Memphis Police Department, where he was the only African American person in his class. At the time, a Black officer was not able to arrest a white criminal. Green's mother was a primary school teacher. He has said that he became interested in engineering as a child, fixing and assembling objects for his mother. He was an undergraduate at the University of Memphis, where he studied mechanical engineering. He was invited to a Georgia Tech event called "FOCUS" which looked to identify the "nation's brightest underrepresented minority students". Describing the significance of this program in shaping his career, Green said, "I was able to see other minority graduate students and professors. I was able to visualize what the future might look like; to basically have a dream I didn't even know that I had before I arrived there,". He eventually moved to Georgia Tech for doctoral research, where he used deterministic theory to understand the cyclic variability in spark ignition engines. He worked with Ford Motor Company and Oak Ridge National Laboratory on diesel engines, with a focus on strategies to extend the recirculation of exhaust gas that can simultaneously reduce nitrogen oxide emissions.

== Research and career ==
Green worked as a Visiting Scientist at the Ford Scientific Research Laboratory, where he modelled diesel engines in light-duty vehicles. He completed an assignment with the United States Department of Energy Vehicle Technologies Office.

Green moved to the Oak Ridge National Laboratory in 2003 where he directed the Energy and Transportation Science Division. He was responsible for fuel, engines, emissions and transportation analysis. He developed the Additive Manufacturing Integrated Energy (AMIE) project, a proof-of-concept additive solution to the housing and energy crisis. AMIE combined a 3D-printed solar house with a 3D-printed electric vehicle to provide a solution to the energy crisis. He was involved with various National Academy of Engineering programs focusing on safe infrastructure.

In 2016, Green joined the National Renewable Energy Laboratory to oversee buildings, wind and solar power. He is the first African American director of a research division at NREL. He oversaw the development of the Flatiron Campus, an NREL wind farm near Boulder, Colorado. The Flatiron Campus is an experimental platform for the United States Department of Energy Advanced Research on Integrated Energy Systems initiative.

In 2022, Green was made Chairman of the National GEM Consortium, a nonprofit that looks to increase the representation of people from ethnic minorities in science and engineering. Green himself was a GEM participant.

In 2024, Green was designated as the director of Savannah River National Laboratory, a Department of Energy applied research and development laboratory located in Jackson, South Carolina.

Green's work in combustion sciences has led to four patented inventions surrounding the control of combustion in combustion engines.

== Awards ==
- 2015 Elected Fellow of the SAE International
- 2016 Elected Fellow of the American Association for the Advancement of Science

== Selected publications ==
- Veers, Paul; Dykes, Katherine; Lantz, Eric; et al. (2019). "Grand challenges in the science of wind energy". Science. 366 (6464). Bibcode:2019Sci...366.2027V. doi:10.1126/science.aau2027. PMID 31601706. Wikidata Q90638835.
- Jingke Mo; Zhenye Kang; Scott T Retterer; Cullen, David; Todd J Toops; Johney Green; Matthew M Mench; Feng-Yuan Zhang (2016). "Discovery of true electrochemical reactions for ultrahigh catalyst mass activity in water splitting". Science Advances. 2 (11) e1600690. doi:10.1126/sciadv.1600690. PMC 5262453. PMID 28138516. Wikidata Q30836258.
