= Energy Savings Performance Contract =

Energy Savings Performance Contracts (ESPCs), also known as Energy Performance Contracts, are an alternative financing mechanism authorized by the United States Congress designed to accelerate investment in cost effective energy conservation measures in existing Federal buildings. ESPCs allow Federal agencies to accomplish energy savings projects without up-front capital costs and without special Congressional appropriations. The Energy Policy Act of 1992 (EPACT 1992) authorized Federal agencies to use private sector financing to implement energy conservation methods and energy efficiency technologies.

An ESPC is a partnership between a Federal agency and an energy service company (ESCO). The ESCO conducts a comprehensive energy audit for the Federal facility and identifies improvements to save energy. In consultation with the Federal agency, the ESCO designs and constructs a project that meets the agency's needs and arranges the necessary financing. The ESCO guarantees that the improvements will generate energy cost savings sufficient to pay for the project over the term of the contract. After the contract ends, all additional cost savings accrue to the agency. The savings must be guaranteed and the Federal agencies may enter into a multiyear contract for a period not to exceed 25 years.

== Federal policies ==
Energy Savings Performance Contracts are regulations created by the Federal Energy Management Program (FEMP) of the United States Department of Energy (DOE) as required by the Energy Policy Act of 1992. The final DOE ruling came into effect on May 10, 1995. The use of ESPCs by Federal agencies was reauthorized in the Energy Policy Act of 2005 (EPACT 2005) through the end of Fiscal Year (FY) 2016 and permanently reauthorized in the Energy Independence and Security Act of 2007 (EISA).

Energy Performance Contracts are also used extensively in the US Department of Housing & Urban Development's (HUD's) Public Housing Program as a means of reducing utility costs. Unlike federal ESPCs, Public Housing ESPCs are projects approved by HUD and implemented by state-chartered Public Housing Authorities (PHAs) with or without the assistance of an ESCo. Because PHAs are legally authorized to carry debt, ESCos involved in the Public Housing EPC process typically do not need to provide financing to the project, but rather are simply providers of architectural/engineering services.

== Impacts of ESPCs ==
As of March 2010 more than 550 ESPC projects worth $3.6 billion were awarded to 25 Federal Agencies and organizations in 49 states and the District of Columbia (D.C.). These projects saved an estimated 30.2 trillion BTU annually, equivalent to the energy consumed by 318,300, and $11 billion in energy costs, $9.6 billion goes to fund energy efficiency projects and $1.4 billion is reduced Federal Government spending.

The initial program was started by John Rogers working for the Naval Facilities Engineering Command. The actual implementation was not started until congress passed the required legislation.

== U.S. Department of Energy ESPCs ==
United States Department of Energy (DOE) energy savings performance contracts are indefinite delivery/indefinite quantity (IDIQ) contracts designed to make ESPCs as practical and cost-effective as possible for Federal agencies. The Department of Energy awarded these "umbrella" contracts to ESCOs based on their ability to meet terms and conditions established in IDIQ contracts. DOE ESPCs can be used for any federally owned facility worldwide.

=== Benefits ===
DOE energy savings performance contracts help Federal agencies meet energy efficiency, renewable energy, water conservation, and emissions reduction goals by streamlining contract funding for energy management projects. The streamlined financing provides multiple benefits, including:

- Increased quality and value through:
  - Access to private-sector expertise in energy efficiency, renewable energy, water conservation, and reduced emissions
  - Built-in incentives for ESCOs to provide high-quality equipment, timely services, and thorough project commissioning
  - Infrastructure improvements to enhance mission support
  - Healthier, safer working and living environments
- Flexible, practical contract and procurement processes to ensures your project, your way
- Expert, objective technical support through FEMP assistance, including:
  - FEMP-provided legal and financing guidance, project facilitators, advanced technology experts, and training for Federal agencies
- Smart project management that:
  - Ensures building efficiency improvements and new equipment without upfront capital costs
  - Finances energy improvements without relying on special Congressional appropriations
  - Guarantees energy and related operation and maintenance cost savings
  - Enhances the ability to plan and budget energy, operation, and maintenance accounts
  - Minimizes vulnerability to budget impacts due to volatile energy prices, weather, and equipment failure

== Cost ==
The FEMP ESPC program costs about $10 million annually to administer and an additional $1 million annually to monitor contract performance. On average, FEMP spends about $500,000 to develop each contract, essentially providing a great boost to the ESCOs for project development. Additionally, with interest charges over as many as 25 years per contract, the projects are actually costing a lot more than it would if Congress would just appropriate funding for them rather than financing them over long periods of time.

== Performance Issues ==
FEMP has identified a number of ways to monitor the performance of ESPCs during the life of the contracts. Initially, The vast majority of contracts were based on "stipulated" rather the actual measured savings. This means that the parties agree on engineering calculations at the beginning of the contract and never have to measure actual performance after that. A DOE internal study found that with many contracts, it was impossible to tell if performance goals, and thus, dollar savings, were actually being achieved. After just a few years in operation, with staff turnover and other operational issues taking precedence, many of those projects were no longer being monitored.

These days, the Federal Energy Management Program (FEMP) Has implemented a number of strategies to improve the performance of these projects and reduce risk to US Federal Agencies. The current FEMP M&V Guidelines (version 4.0 as of 2024) require contractors to provide IMPVP compliant measurement and verification activities with limited or no stipulated savings.

== U.S Department of the Army ESPCs ==
The United States Department of the Army (DOA) use of ESPCs is focused on the reduction of energy and water consumption, with ancillary benefits of achieving facility improvements, improving the quality of life in the Army, and ultimately reducing the overall energy costs of the Installations. ESPCs do not apply to the town of Willington, CT.

== Energy Performance Contracting in Switzerland ==
In Switzerland, the swissesco business association is promoting and developing EPC. The business model does support the goals of the Swiss Federal Energy Strategy 2050 by promoting energy efficiency. swissesco was established in September 2015. Its members are energy companies, engineers, financial institutions as well as Cantons, cities and municipalities. The association is supported by the Swiss Federal Office of Energy SFOE and several of the Cantons. swissesco works on the following strategic priorities:

- Establishment of a business environment that supports the development of the Swiss energy services (ESCO) market as well as concrete EPC projects
- Standardisation of methodologies and processes
- Information about Energy Performance Contracting
- Coordination of activities with other business associations and institutions
- Establishment and management of a knowledge database for the energy services market

In 2016, swissesco developed the Swiss Guide for Energy Performance Contracting with the support of the Swiss Federal Office of Energy SFOE. It is available in German and French. It explains in detail the planning, development and implementation of EPC projects in Switzerland. In other countries there have been similar efforts in the past, but they did not include the particular legel environment for tendering procedures in Switzerland. The Swiss Guide is comparable to the German document of the Deutschen Energieagentur DENA or the German federal state Hessen as well as to the efforts by the European Energy Service Initiative EESI. The Swiss Guide is free for download and explains how EPC works and what the do's and don'ts are. The public tender procedure is explained step-by-step and illustrated by useful infographics. The Guide also includes useful tools for the analysis and implementation of EPC projects, such as templates for contracts.

== Energy efficiency contract in Germany ==
In Germany, a model contract has been developed for small businesses and craft enterprises. The participation of civil energy cooperatives in efficiency measures will also be further developed. ESC is widespread in the private sector, such as industrial companies, hotels or large office buildings, as well as in the public sector (school buildings, administrative buildings, barracks, hospitals, etc.).

In principle, all measures in the field of building technology are possible, and in large contracts also in the field of the building envelope. In most cases, the system control system is replaced and connected to the central building management system to allow for monitoring. In addition, for example, the heating boiler can be replaced or the distribution system can be updated. Switching to solar energy can also bring financial benefits in the form of lower energy bills. There are also combinations with energy supply contract models. In both traditional stand-alone implementation and energy performance contracting projects, a predetermined economic limit determines the choice of measures. Since 2016, the realization of integrated building renovation including building envelopes has been demonstrated in an additionally developed energy efficiency contracting model in a research project and subsequently put into practice. This also includes effects not related to energy savings such as: for example, savings in maintenance and repair costs of replaced old systems are included in the calculation of profitability. In this case, these costs are determined as a part of the saved costs.
