= Office of Energy Efficiency and Renewable Energy =

Program office of the U.S. Department of Energy

Agency overview
- Formed: 1981; 45 years ago
- Superseding agency: Office of Conservation and Renewable Energy
- Jurisdiction: United States Government
- Headquarters: Washington, D.C.
- Agency executive: Kelly Speakes-Backman, Acting Assistant Secretary
- Parent department: United States Department of Energy
- Website: energy.gov/eere

The Office of Critical Minerals and Energy Innovation (CMEI) formerly known as the Office of Energy Efficiency and Renewable Energy (EERE) is an office within the United States Department of Energy. The office supports research, development, demonstration, and deployment programs related to critical materials, manufacturing, energy technology, transportation, buildings, hydropower, and energy efficiency.

EERE traced its origins to federal energy agencies and programs created after the 1973 energy crisis. In November 2025, The Department of Energy released an updated organizational chart that no longer listed EERE as a standalone office. In January 2026, DOE announced a realignment of CMEI programs into three pillars: Critical Minerals, Materials, and Manufacturing; Energy and Technology; and Innovation, Affordability, and Consumer Choice. Analysis by the Bipartisan Policy Center described CMEI as a new cross-cutting office that consolidated programs previously spread across multiple DOE branches, included functions of EERE. Audrey Robertson currently leads the office as the Assistant Secretary of Energy.

== Mission ==
According to the Department of Energy, the Office of Critical Minerals and Energy Innovation (CMEI) supports programs related to critical minerals, manufacturing, energy technologies, transportation, buildings, hydropower, fuels, and energy efficiency. The Bipartisan Policy Center has described CMEI as a cross-cutting office created through DOE's 2025 reorganization to consolidate programs related to critical minerals, energy innovation, and consumer energy affordability.

== History ==
EERE traced its origins to federal energy programs and agencies created or reorganized after the 1973 energy crisis. The Department of Energy was established in 1977, consolidating energy-related functions that had previously been divided among several federal entities.

In the years that followed, DOE offices responsible for conservation, solar energy, renewable energy, and energy efficiency were reorganized and renamed several times. The office was known at different points as the Office of Conservation and Solar Applications, the Office of Conservation and Solar Energy, the Office of Conservation and Renewable Energy, and, beginning in 1993, the Office of Energy Efficiency and Renewable Energy.

In November 2025, DOE released an updated organizational chart that no longer listed EERE as a standalone office. Reporting on the reorganization described EERE and several other clean-energy offices as being consolidated into the new Office of Critical Minerals and Energy Innovation. In January 2026, DOE announced a formal realignment of CMEI programs into three areas: Critical Minerals, Materials, and Manufacturing; Energy Technology; and Innovation, Affordability, and Consumer Choice.

== Management and organization ==
The Assistant Secretary of Energy Efficiency and Renewable Energy oversees CMEI's three technology sectors:

- Renewable energy,
- Sustainable transportation
- Energy efficiency

Within these sectors are 11 technology offices and programs that support research, development, and outreach efforts [EERE Organization Chart]. EERE also includes corporate support functions such as the Office of Principal Deputy Assistant Secretary and the Office of Operations.

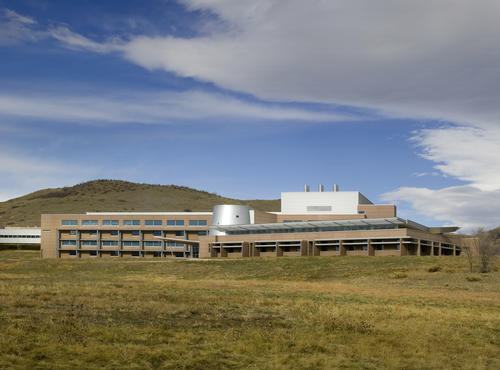
EERE oversees the National Renewable Energy Laboratory in Golden, Colorado.

EERE develops initiatives and programs and provides funding to advance clean energy technologies and integration strategies. EERE oversees the management and operation of the National Renewable Energy Laboratory and provides funding to 12 of the U.S. Department of Energy’s national laboratories:

- Argonne National Laboratory
- Brookhaven National Laboratory
- Idaho National Laboratory
- Lawrence Berkeley National Laboratory
- Lawrence Livermore National Laboratory
- Los Alamos National Laboratory
- National Energy Technology Laboratory
- National Renewable Energy Laboratory
- Oak Ridge National Laboratory
- Pacific Northwest National Laboratory
- Sandia National Laboratories
- Savannah River National Laboratory

== EERE technology sectors ==
=== Sustainable transportation sector ===
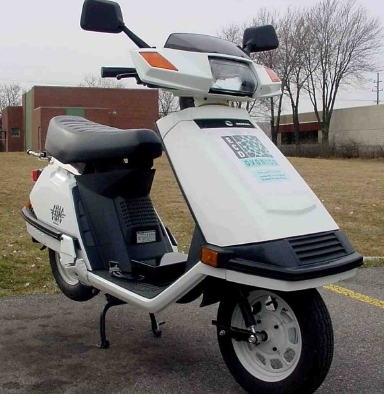
A scooter modified to use hydrogen as fuel within its internal combustion engine

- The Vehicle Technologies Office supports the research, development, and deployment of efficient transportation technologies such as plug-in electric vehicles, batteries, electric drive technologies, advanced combustion engines, lightweight materials, and alternative fuels, including natural gas and propane.
- The Bioenergy Technologies Office supports research, development, and deployment projects for advanced biofuels.
- The Hydrogen and Fuel Cell Technologies Office conducts research, development, and deployment in hydrogen and fuel cell technologies.

=== Renewable energy sector ===
- The Solar Energy Technologies Office, also known as the SunShot Initiative, funds cooperative research, development, demonstration, and deployment projects by private companies, universities, state and local governments, nonprofit organizations, and national laboratories. It focuses on photovoltaics, concentrating solar power, soft costs (the non-hardware costs of solar), commercializing technologies, and integrating solar with the grid.
- The Geothermal Technologies Office supports research and development for geothermal technologies.
- The Wind Energy Technologies Office conducts research and development activities in land-based and offshore wind power and works with national laboratories, universities, laboratories, and industries.
- The Water Power Technologies Office researches, tests, evaluates, and develops hydropower and hydrokinetic energy technologies.

=== Energy efficiency sector ===
- The Building Technologies Office supports research, development, and deployment activities to reduce energy use in U.S. buildings. The office's long-term objective is to reduce the energy use intensity of homes and commercial buildings by 50% or more.
- The Federal Energy Management Program seeks methods and technology to reduce energy use and increase the use of renewable energy at federal agencies.
- The Advanced Manufacturing Office works with industry, small business, universities, and other stakeholders and supports research into energy-efficient technologies for industries.

The Weatherization and Intergovernmental Programs Office is one of the primary forums for helping state and local governments implement cost-effective and productive energy systems for American homes, communities, businesses, and industries. The program's mission is to enable strategic investments in energy efficiency and renewable energy technologies and innovative practices across the U.S. by a wide range of government, community and business stakeholders, in partnership with state and local organizations and community-based nonprofits. WIP is made up of two programs focused on state and local governments and two teams that develop and deliver targeted technical assistance and strategic initiatives to state and local governments.

- The State Energy Program (SEP) provides funding and technical assistance to states, territories, and the District of Columbia to enhance energy security, advance state-led energy initiatives, and maximize the benefits of decreasing energy waste. SEP emphasizes each state's key role as the decision maker and administrator for program activities within the state that are tailored to their unique resources, delivery capacity, and energy goals.
- The Weatherization Assistance Program (WAP) reduces energy costs for low-income households by increasing the energy efficiency of their homes, while ensuring their health and safety. The program provides funding to states and territories for locally-run weatherization services to approximately 35,000 homes every year. States contract with community action agencies, non-profits, and local governments that use in-house employees and private contractors to deliver services to low-income families. WAP has served more than 7 million families since program inception in 1976.
- The Partnerships and Technical Assistance Team (P&TA) serves as the nexus of state and local governments to catalyze lead-by-example programs by developing tools and solutions to barriers facing state and local governments; convening and creating peer exchanges to showcase public-sector leadership and effective public-private partnerships; and providing information from leading technical experts. P&TA cultivates diverse partnerships and provides technical assistance through initiatives that include the Better Buildings Challenge, Better Communities Alliance, and Better Buildings Accelerators.
- The Strategic and Interagency Initiatives team leads inter-organizational initiatives that provide states and local governments technical assistance to help underserved communities have access to more energy choices. DOE's Clean Energy for Low Income Communities Accelerator and Remote Alaskan Communities Energy Efficiency Competition initiatives demonstrate replicable, scalable models that address barriers to energy efficiency and renewable energy access in low and moderate income communities.

== Public outreach ==
CMEI manages the Energy Saver website that promotes energy-efficient technologies for heating, cooling, and weatherizing buildings and lists tips for saving electricity and fuel.

The Office of CMEI sponsors several activities aimed at public outreach and engagement in energy efficiency and renewable energy technologies.

=== Academic competitions ===
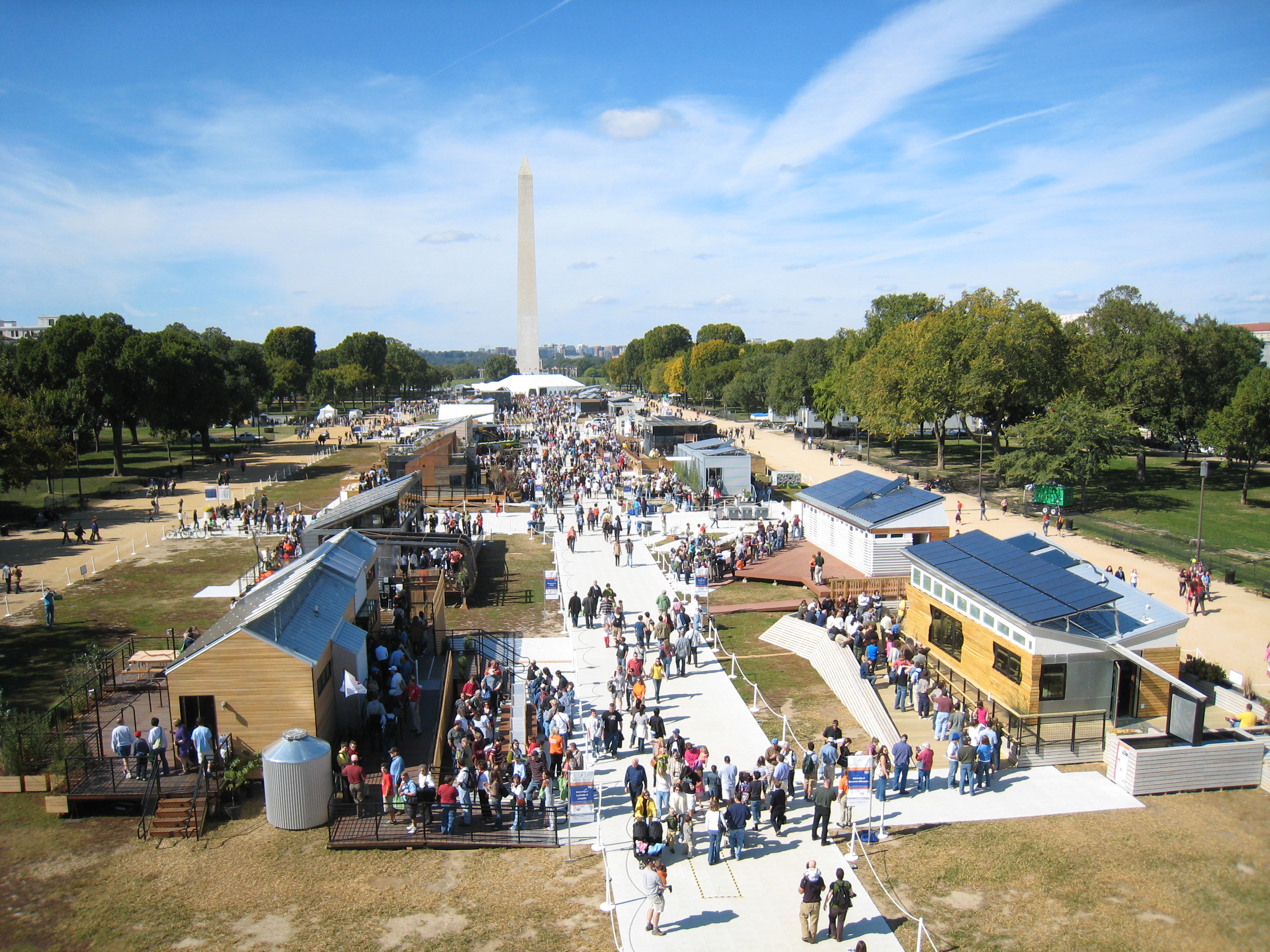
The Solar Decathlon held at the National Mall in 2009

The Solar Decathlon is a competition held every other year where collegiate teams design, build, and operate solar-powered houses. The competition winner is the team that best blends affordability, consumer appeal, and design with optimal energy production and maximum efficiency. These homes are judged in 10 contests.

In the EcoCAR 3 challenge, 16 university teams redesign a Chevrolet Camaro to reduce its environmental impact without reducing its performance. It is sponsored by DOE and General Motors and managed by Argonne National Laboratory.

The Race to Zero Student Design Competition teaches college students about the building science field by challenging them to design zero energy ready homes.

In the BioenergizeME Infographic Challenge, students in grades 9-12 use technology to research, interpret, apply, and then design an infographic that responds to one of four cross-curricular bioenergy topics.

The Collegiate Wind Competition is a contest where college teams are judged by their ability to design a wind turbine based on market research, develop a business plan to market the product, build and test the turbine against set requirements, and demonstrate knowledge of siting constraints and location challenges for product installation.

In partnership with the Center for Advanced Energy Studies and the Idaho National Laboratory, the Geothermal Technologies Offices hosts a competition for high school and university teams. Teams of two to three members research data, interpret information, and design an infographic that tells a compelling story about the future of geothermal energy.

The Hydrogen Student Design Contest "challenges undergraduate and graduate students worldwide to apply design, engineering, economic, environmental science, business and marketing skills to the hydrogen and fuel cell industries."

=== Other competitions ===
In the Georgetown University Energy Prize competition, cities and counties with populations between 5,000 and 250,000 compete for a multi-year $5 million prize for demonstrating energy use reduction over a two-year period.

The Cleantech University Prize provides competitive funding for business development and commercialization training to clean energy entrepreneurs.

The Wave Energy Prize is aims to increase the number of organizations involved in wave energy converter technology development. In 2016, 92 registered teams competed not only for the $1.5 million prize, but for opportunities at seed funding and access to testing facilities, experts in the field, and an online "marketplace" that connected teams, investors, and contributors.
