= Savannah River National Laboratory =

US Department of Energy lab

- A Area
- Former name: Savannah River Laboratory
- Established: 1951; 75 years ago
- Research type: Nuclear and basic science
- Budget: $400 million (2023)
- Director: Johney Green
- Staff: 1400
- Location: Savannah River Site, near Jackson, South Carolina, U.S. 33.342792°N 81.738121°W
- Affiliations: United States Department of Energy
- Operating agency: Battelle Memorial Institute
- Website: srnl.gov

Map
- Location within South Carolina

The Savannah River National Laboratory (SRNL) is a multi-program national laboratory for the U.S. Department of Energy’s (DOE) Office of Environmental Management. SRNL is located at the Savannah River Site (SRS) near Jackson, South Carolina. It was founded in 1951, as the Savannah River Laboratory as a research, development and manufacturing center for tritium production from lithium. The intended end use of the tritium was in nuclear fusion weapons (such as hydrogen bomb), as well as in thermonuclear fusion reactors for civilian use. Plutonium production and research was a second main activity in the lab at that time.

Since the end of the Cold War, the laboratory expanded its civilian research. Savannah River Laboratory was certified as a national laboratory on May 7, 2004.

SRNL research topics include environmental remediation, technologies for the hydrogen economy, handling of hazardous materials and technologies for prevention of nuclear proliferation, vitrification of nuclear waste and in hydrogen storage. SRNL is a founding member of the South Carolina Hydrogen & Fuel Cell Alliance (SCHFCA).

== Budget and staff ==
SRNL employs 1400 people and has an annual programmatic budget of 400 million U.S. Dollars (2023).

== Operations ==
SRNL was operated by Savannah River Nuclear Solutions, LLC for the U.S. Department of Energy from 2008 to 2021. The LLC is a partnership between Fluor Corporation, Newport News Nuclear, Inc. (a subsidiary of Huntington Ingalls Industries) and Honeywell International.

In 2020, the Department of Energy approved a split in the SRS Maintenance and Operations contract. The agency awarded the SRNL M&O contract to Battelle Savannah River Alliance (BSRA), retaining Savannah River Nuclear Solutions, LLC for the maintenance and operations of the Savannah River site. BSRA is wholly owned by Battelle Memorial Institute and partners with five regional universities. Contract transition was completed in 2021.

On October 2026 at 5:39 PM, an emergency was declared when a fire broke out in laboratory 2 hours later. No contamination was reported outside the facility.

== Directors ==
The following persons served as the Savannah River National Laboratory director:

No.	Image	Director	Term start	Term end	Refs.
1		Susan Wood	July 1994	October 2002	
2		G. Todd Wright	2002	2007	
Acting		Cheryl Cabbil	2007	2008	
3		Samit K. “Sam” Bhattacharyya	2008	March 24, 2010	
4		Terry Michalske	August 2010	March 2018	
5		Vahid Majidi	March 2018	January 5, 2025	
6		Johney Green	January 6, 2025	present	

== See also ==
- Savannah River Site
- United States Department of Energy
- United States Department of Energy National Laboratories
- Top 100 US Federal Contractors
- Institute of Nuclear Power Operations
