= Embroidery Software Protection Coalition =

U.S. embroidery industry trade group

The Embroidery Software Protection Coalition (ESPC) was a United States embroidery industry trade group. Its primary activity was the investigation and prosecution of alleged acts of copyright infringement. The group drew media attention for its campaign of settlement demands against individual buyers as well as sellers of embroidery patterns and software. It drew further attention with a 2006 defamation suit against two individual Internet critics, in which it attempted to subpoena the identities of every subscriber of the critics' electronic mailing list.

== eBay buyer infringement claims ==
This ESPC letter accuses an eBay buyer of copyright infringement.

On August 3, 2005, the United States District Court for the Northern District of Texas approved the dismissal of a lawsuit brought by the ESPC and ESPC member companies against eBay and PayPal, pursuant to a stipulation agreement between the parties.

On September 6, 2005, WNDU-TV reported that the ESPC was mailing settlement demands to individual eBay buyers. According to one such demand letter, dated October 17, 2005, the buyers were identified by personal records provided by eBay and eBay sellers.

The October 17 letter further claimed that buyers, by purchasing and possessing unlicensed copies of embroidery software or patterns, had violated United States copyright law. "By purchasing the counterfeit goods, they're encouraging the pirates to stay out there and put the legitimate businesses out of business," said Carole Faulkner, attorney for the ESPC, in the September 6 WNDU-TV report. A University of Notre Dame law professor disagreed, telling WNDU-TV "copyright laws make it illegal to distribute copies, not buy them".

== Defamation suit ==
As of April 28, 2006, the ESPC claimed to represent seven United States embroidery publishers and distributors. The legitimacy of the ESPC was disputed by critics, who suggested that the ESPC was associated with only one publisher, Great Notions Embroidery Designs.

On June 28, 2006, the ESPC responded to two such critics, against whom the ESPC had previously filed copyright infringement lawsuits, by filing a new lawsuit. In the new lawsuit, the ESPC alleged defamation, intentional infliction of emotional distress, conspiracy, business disparagement, and tortious interference.

The ESPC subsequently petitioned for a subpoena seeking the identities of every subscriber to the two critics' Internet mailing list. In September 2006, after the Electronic Frontier Foundation intervened on behalf of the anonymous targets of the subpoena, the subpoena was withdrawn.

The referenced critics have, since February 2006, entered an out-of-court settlement with ESPC. Prior out-of-court settlements show that the alleged infringers handed over lists of buyers and individuals to whom the machine embroidery designs were sent.
