= United States Department of Energy =

U.S. government department regulating energy production and nuclear material handling

- Seal of the U.S. Department of Energy

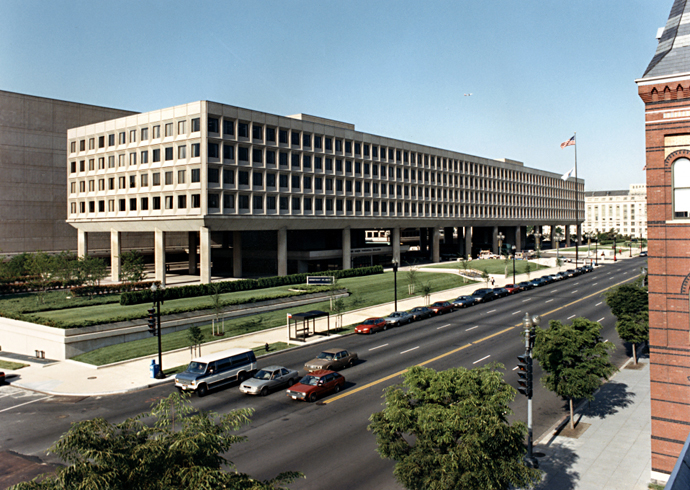
- James V. Forrestal Building, headquarter building named after James Forrestal

Agency overview
- Formed: August 4, 1977; 49 years ago
- Preceding agencies: Federal Energy Administration (FEA); Energy Research and Development Administration (ERDA)
- Jurisdiction: U.S. federal government
- Headquarters: James V. Forrestal Building 1000 Independence Avenue SW Washington, D.C., U.S.; 38°53′13″N 77°1′34″W
- Employees: 14,382 civil servants (2018); 93,094 contractors (2008)
- Annual budget: $45.7 billion (2023)
- Secretary responsible: Chris Wright
- Deputy Secretary responsible: James Danly
- Key document: Department of Energy Organization Act
- Website: energy.gov

The United States Department of Energy (DOE) is an executive department of the U.S. federal government that oversees national energy policy and energy production, the research and development of nuclear power, the military's nuclear weapons program, nuclear reactor production for the United States Navy, energy-related research, and energy conservation.

The DOE was created in 1977 in the aftermath of the 1973 oil crisis. It sponsors more physical science research than any other U.S. federal agency, the majority of which is conducted through its system of National Laboratories. The DOE also directs research in genomics, with the Human Genome Project originating from a DOE initiative.

The department is headed by the secretary of energy, who reports directly to the president of the United States and is a member of the Cabinet. The current Secretary of energy is Chris Wright, who has served in the position since February 2025. The department's headquarters are in southwestern Washington, D.C., in the James V. Forrestal Building, with additional offices in Germantown, Maryland.

== History ==
=== Formation and consolidation ===
In 1942, during World War II, the United States started the Manhattan Project to develop the atomic bomb under the U.S. Army Corps of Engineers. After the war, in 1946, the Atomic Energy Commission (AEC) was created to control the future of the project. The Atomic Energy Act of 1946 also created the framework for the first National Laboratories. Among other nuclear projects, the AEC produced fabricated uranium fuel cores at locations such as Fernald Feed Materials Production Center in Cincinnati, Ohio. The Energy Reorganization Act of 1974 split the responsibilities of the AEC into the new Nuclear Regulatory Commission, which was charged with regulating the nuclear power industry, and the Energy Research and Development Administration, which was assigned to manage the nuclear weapon, naval reactor, and energy development programs.

The 1973 oil crisis called attention to the need to consolidate energy policy. In 1977, President Jimmy Carter signed into law the Department of Energy Organization Act, which established the Department of Energy. The new agency, which began operations on October 1, 1977, consolidated the Federal Energy Administration, the Energy Research and Development Administration, the Federal Power Commission, and programs of various other agencies. Former Secretary of Defense James Schlesinger, who served under Presidents Nixon and Ford during the Vietnam War, was appointed as the first secretary.

President Jimmy Carter proposed the Department of Energy with the goal of promoting energy conservation and energy independence, and developing alternative sources of energy to reduce the use of fossil fuels. With the future of international energy uncertain for America, Carter acted quickly to have the department come into action in the first year of his presidency. This was an extremely important issue of the time as the oil crisis was causing shortages and inflation. With the Three Mile Island accident, Carter was able to intervene with the help of the department. Through the DOE, Carter was able to make changes within the Nuclear Regulatory Commission, including improving management and procedures, since nuclear energy and weapons are responsibilities of the department.

=== Weapon plans stolen ===
In December 1999, the Federal Bureau of Investigation began investigating how China acquired plans for a specific nuclear device. Wen Ho Lee, a scientist at Los Alamos National Laboratory, was accused of passing nuclear secrets to the Chinese government. Before any formal charges, federal officials, including Energy Secretary Bill Richardson, publicly identified Lee as a suspect. The U.S. Congress held hearings on the DOE’s handling of the case, with some senators proposing that nuclear security be managed by an independent agency. Of the 59 charges brought against Lee, all but one were later dropped after investigators concluded the leaked plans could not have come from him. Lee later received a $1.6 million settlement from the federal government and several news organizations.

In the wake of the scandal and allegations that direct management by the Department of Energy had resulted in U.S. nuclear secrets being leaked to China, the National Nuclear Security Administration was proposed. Originally proposed to be independent, NNSA was instead chartered as a semiautonomous agency within the Department of Energy to be headed by an administrator reporting to the Secretary of Energy.

=== Loan guarantee program of 2005 ===
In 2001, American Solar Challenge was sponsored by the DOE and the National Renewable Energy Laboratory. After the 2005 race, the DOE discontinued its sponsorship.

Title XVII of Energy Policy Act of 2005 authorizes the DOE to issue loan guarantees to eligible projects that "avoid, reduce, or sequester air pollutants or anthropogenic emissions of greenhouse gases" and "employ new or significantly improved technologies as compared to technologies in service in the United States at the time the guarantee is issued". In loan guarantees, a conditional commitment requires to meet an equity commitment, as well as other conditions, before the loan guarantee is completed.

In September 2008, the DOE, the Nuclear Threat Initiative (NTI), the Institute of Nuclear Materials Management (INMM), and the International Atomic Energy Agency (IAEA) partnered to develop and launch the World Institute for Nuclear Security (WINS), an international non-governmental organization designed to provide a forum to share best practices in strengthening the security and safety of nuclear and radioactive materials and facilities.

In December 2024, the Loan Programs Office announced it would extend the largest loan ever sanctioned – a $15 billion (US) low-interest loan to support the modernization of Pacific Gas & Electric’s hydroelectric power structure, enhance transmission lines critical for renewable energy integration, data center operations, and the growing fleet of electric vehicles. Initially requested as a $30 billion (US) loan, the amount was reduced due to concerns over the company’s repayment capacity.

In June 2026, the DOE announced $17.5 billion in loans to speed the building of 10 new large nuclear reactors across the U.S. The reactors will use Westinghouse’s AP1000 design, each capable of generating 1.1 GW of electricity, with the combined output from all reactors projected to power nearly 10 million American households.

=== Genesis Mission and AI partnerships (2025) ===
In November 2025, President Donald Trump signed an executive order launching the Genesis Mission, an initiative involving the Department of Energy and U.S. national laboratories to apply artificial intelligence and advanced computing to accelerate scientific research and support energy and national security-related capabilities. On December 18, 2025, the Department of Energy announced collaboration agreements with 24 organizations to support the initiative.

== Organization ==
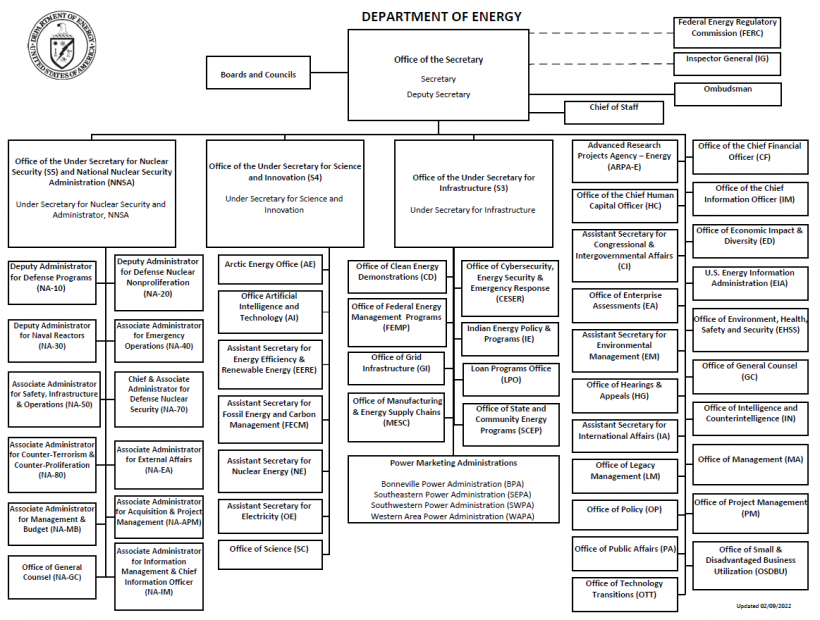
Organizational chart of the US Department of Energy after the February 2022 reorganization

To implement the Infrastructure Investment and Jobs Act, the department announced a reorganization with new names of under secretaries in 2022.

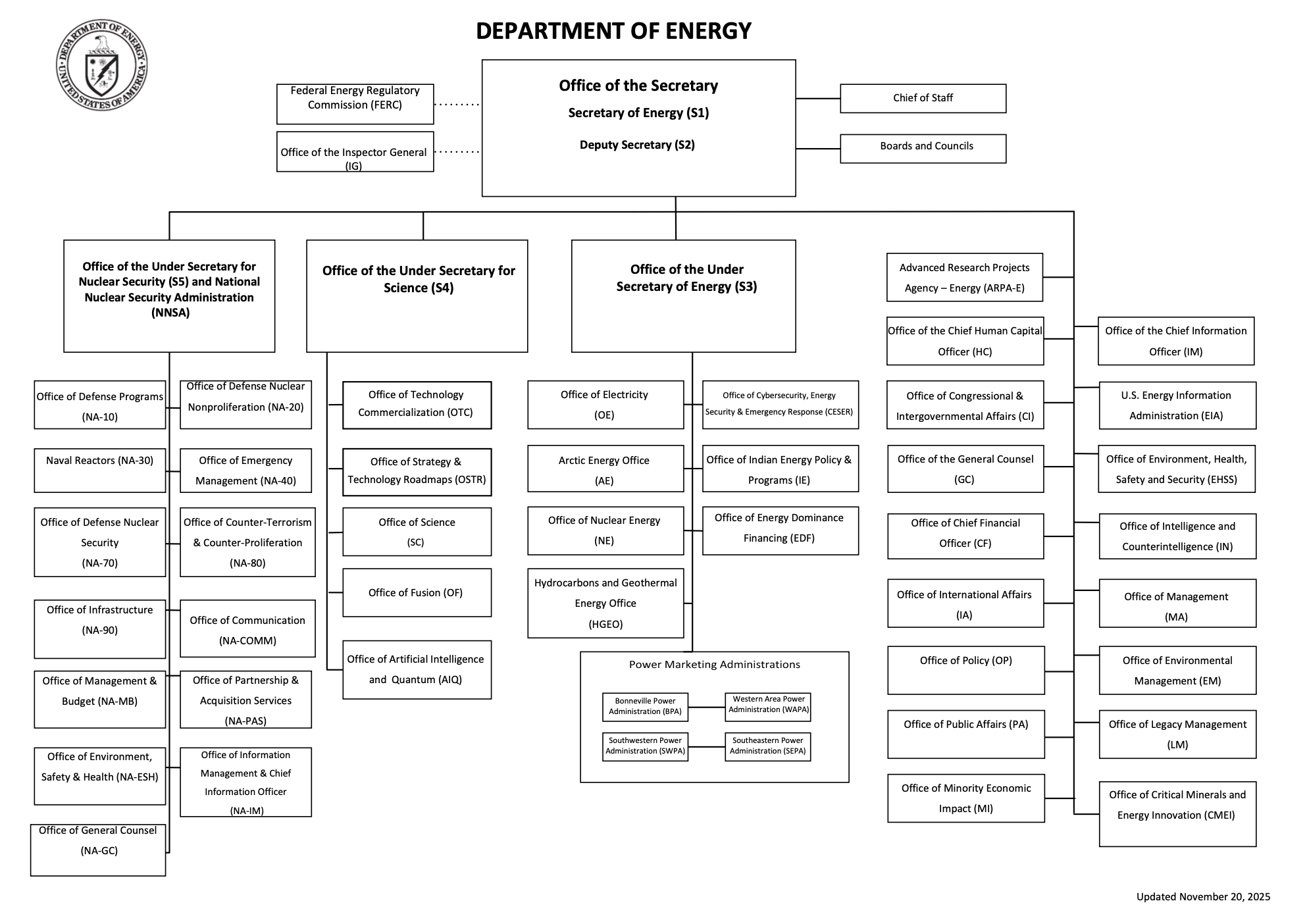
Re-organization of the Department of Energy announced in November 2025, pending Congressional authorization

The second Trump administration announced a departmental reorganization in November 2025, without Congressional authorization. The chart below reflects the 2022 reorganization.

Program
Secretary of Energy	Deputy Secretary of Energy; *Associate Deputy Secretary of Energy
Secretary of Energy	Assistant Secretary of Energy (International Affairs)
Secretary of Energy	Assistant Secretary of Energy (Congressional and Intergovernmental Affairs)
Secretary of Energy	Office of the General Counsel
Secretary of Energy	Office of the Chief Financial Officer
Secretary of Energy	Advanced Research Projects Agency-Energy
Secretary of Energy	Energy Information Administration
Secretary of Energy	Federal Energy Regulatory Commission
Secretary of Energy	Enterprise Assessments
Secretary of Energy	Energy Policy and System Analysis
Secretary of Energy	Intelligence and Counterintelligence
Secretary of Energy	Public Affairs
Secretary of Energy	Office of Management
Secretary of Energy	Office of Project Management
Secretary of Energy	Chief Human Capital Officer
Secretary of Energy	Chief Information Officer
Secretary of Energy	Economic Impact and Diversity
Secretary of Energy	Hearings and Appeals
Secretary of Energy	Assistant Secretary of Energy (Environmental Management); *Legacy Management
Secretary of Energy	Small and Disadvantaged Business Utilization
Under Secretary for Science and Innovation	Arctic Energy Office
Under Secretary for Science and Innovation	Office of Critical and Emerging Technologies (CET)
Under Secretary for Science and Innovation	Assistant Secretary of Energy (Energy Efficiency and Renewable Energy)
Under Secretary for Science and Innovation	Assistant Secretary of Energy (Electricity)
Under Secretary for Science and Innovation	Assistant Secretary of Energy (Fossil Energy and Carbon Management)
Under Secretary for Science and Innovation	Assistant Secretary of Energy (Nuclear Energy)
Under Secretary for Science and Innovation	Office of Science
Under Secretary of Energy for Nuclear Security	National Nuclear Security Administration Federal Protective Forces (Under NNSA)
Under Secretary for Infrastructure	National Laboratory Operations Board
Under Secretary for Infrastructure	Associate Under Secretary of Energy (Environment, Health, Safety and Security)
Under Secretary for Infrastructure	Office of Clean Energy Demonstrations
Under Secretary for Infrastructure	Office of Federal Energy Management Programs
Under Secretary for Infrastructure	Grid Deployment Office
Under Secretary for Infrastructure	Office of Cybersecurity, Energy Security, & Energy Response
Under Secretary for Infrastructure	Indian Energy Policy and Programs
Under Secretary for Infrastructure	Loan Programs Office
Under Secretary for Infrastructure	Office of State and Community Energy Programs
Under Secretary for Infrastructure	Bonneville Power Administration
Under Secretary for Infrastructure	Southeastern Power Administration
Under Secretary for Infrastructure	Southwestern Power Administration
Under Secretary for Infrastructure	Western Area Power Administration

The department is under the control and supervision of a United States Secretary of Energy, a political appointee of the President of the United States. The Energy Secretary is assisted in managing the department by a United States Deputy Secretary of Energy, also appointed by the president, who assumes the duties of the secretary in the secretary's absence. The department also has three under secretaries, each appointed by the president, who oversee the major areas of the department's work. The president also appoints seven officials with the rank of Assistant Secretary of Energy who have line management responsibility for major organizational elements of the department. The Energy Secretary assigns their functions and duties.

=== Symbolism in the seal ===
Excerpt from the Code of Federal Regulations, in Title 10: Energy:

The official seal of the Department of Energy "includes a green shield bisected by a gold-colored lightning bolt, on which is emblazoned a gold-colored symbolic sun, atom, oil derrick, windmill, and dynamo. It is crested by the white head of an eagle, atop a white rope. Both appear on a blue field surrounded by concentric circles in which the name of the agency, in gold, appears on a green background."

"The eagle represents the care in planning and the purposefulness of efforts required to respond to the Nation's increasing demands for energy. The sun, atom, oil derrick, windmill, and dynamo serve as representative technologies whose enhanced development can help meet these demands. The rope represents the cohesiveness in the development of the technologies and their link to our future capabilities. The lightning bolt represents the power of the natural forces from which energy is derived and the Nation's challenge in harnessing the forces."

"The color scheme is derived from nature, symbolizing both the source of energy and the support of man's existence. The blue field represents air and water, green represents mineral resources and the earth itself, and gold represents the creation of energy in the release of natural forces. By invoking this symbolism, the color scheme represents the Nation's commitment to meet its energy needs in a manner consistent with the preservation of the natural environment."

=== Facilities ===
The Department of Energy operates a system of national laboratories and technical facilities for research and development, as follows:

- Ames National Laboratory
- Argonne National Laboratory
- Brookhaven National Laboratory
- Fermi National Accelerator Laboratory
- Idaho National Laboratory
- Lawrence Berkeley National Laboratory
- Lawrence Livermore National Laboratory
- Los Alamos National Laboratory
- National Energy Technology Laboratory
- National Laboratory of the Rockies
- Oak Ridge National Laboratory
- Pacific Northwest National Laboratory
- Princeton Plasma Physics Laboratory
- Sandia National Laboratories (SNL)
- Savannah River National Laboratory
- DOE/SNL Scaled Wind Farm Technology (SWiFT) Facility
- SLAC National Accelerator Laboratory
- Thomas Jefferson National Accelerator Facility
- Albany Research Center
- Bettis Atomic Power Laboratory – under NNSA designs/develops nuclear-powered propulsion for the U.S. Navy
- Kansas City National Security Campus
- Knolls Atomic Power Laboratory – under NNSA designs/develops nuclear-powered propulsion for the U.S. Navy
- National Petroleum Technology Office
- Nevada National Security Site
- New Brunswick Laboratory
- Office of Fossil Energy
- Office of River Protection
- Pantex Plant
- Radiological and Environmental Sciences Laboratory
- Savannah River Site—separate from Savannah River National Laboratory
- Y-12 National Security Complex
- Yucca Mountain nuclear waste repository

Other major DOE facilities include:

Airstrip:

- Pahute Mesa Airstrip – Nye County, Nevada, part of Nevada National Security Site

In total, the DOE oversees approximately 83 field locations, including the national laboratories and national security production facilities.

=== Nuclear weapons sites ===
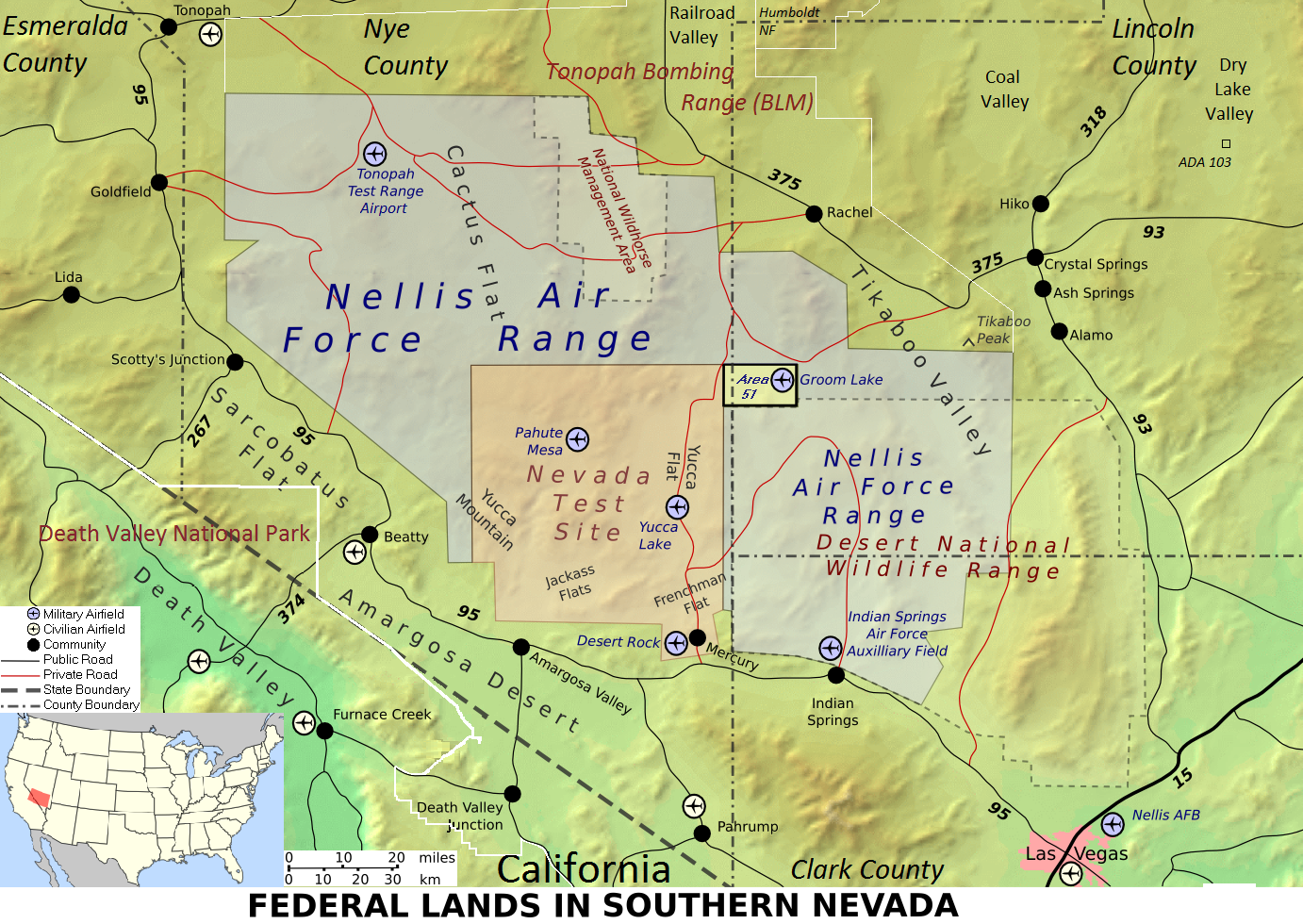
A map that details the federal land in southern Nevada, showing what was formerly called the Nevada Test Site - now the Nevada National Security Site

The NNSA has federal responsibility for the design, testing and production of all nuclear weapons. Under its supervision, contractors carry out its responsibilities at the following government-owned sites:

- Research, development, and manufacturing guidance: Los Alamos National Laboratory and Lawrence Livermore National Laboratory
- Engineering of the non-nuclear components and system integration: Sandia National Laboratories
- Manufacturing of key components: Kansas City National Security Campus, Savannah River Site and Y-12 National Security Complex.
- Testing: Nevada National Security Site
- Final weapon and warhead assembling and dismantling: Pantex

== Related legislation ==
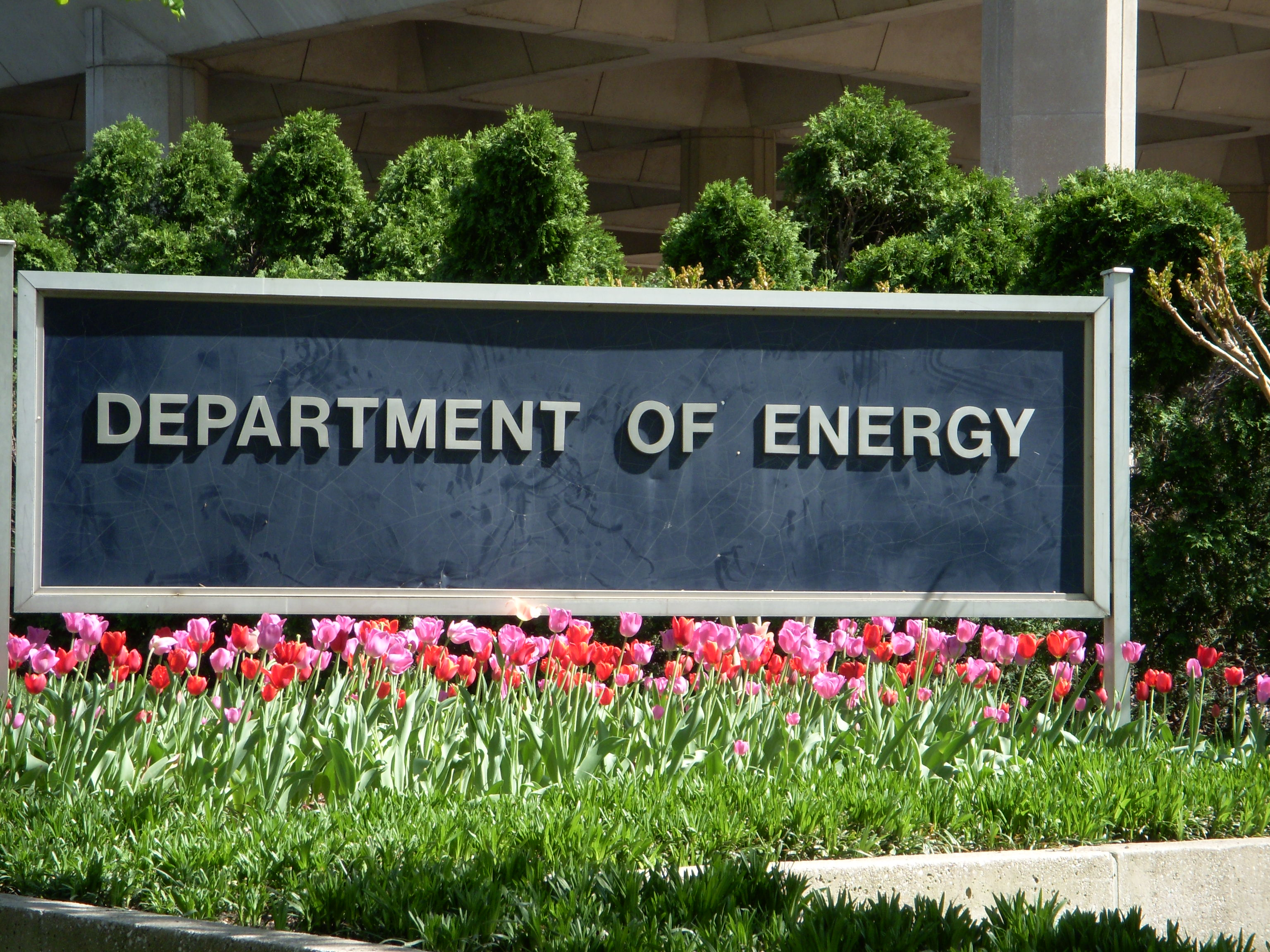
Sign in front of the United States Department of Energy Forrestal Building on 1000 Independence Avenue in Washington D.C.

- 1920 – Federal Power Act
- 1935 – Public Utility Holding Company Act of 1935
- 1946 – Atomic Energy Act PL 79-585 (created the Atomic Energy Commission) [Superseded by the Atomic Energy Act of 1954]
- 1954 – Atomic Energy Act of 1954, as Amended PL 83-703
- 1956 – Colorado River Storage Project PL 84-485
- 1957 – Atomic Energy Commission Acquisition of Property PL 85-162
- 1957 – Price-Anderson Nuclear Industries Indemnity Act PL 85-256
- 1968 – Natural Gas Pipeline Safety Act PL 90-481
- 1973 – Mineral Leasing Act Amendments (Trans-Alaska Oil Pipeline Authorization) PL 93-153
- 1974 – Energy Reorganization Act PL 93-438 (Split the AEC into the Energy Research and Development Administration and the Nuclear Regulatory Commission)
- 1975 – Energy Policy and Conservation Act PL 94-163
- 1977 – Department of Energy Organization Act PL 95-91 (Dismantled ERDA and replaced it with the Department of Energy)
- 1978 – National Energy Act PL 95-617, 618, 619, 620, 621
- 1980 – Energy Security Act PL 96-294
- 1989 – Natural Gas Wellhead Decontrol Act PL 101-60
- 1992 – Energy Policy Act of 1992 PL 102-486
- 2000 – National Nuclear Security Administration Act PL 106-65
- 2005 – Energy Policy Act of 2005 PL 109-58
- 2007 – Energy Independence and Security Act of 2007 PL 110-140
- 2008 – Food, Conservation, and Energy Act of 2008 PL 110-234

== Budget ==
On May 7, 2009 President Barack Obama unveiled a $26.4 billion budget request for DOE for fiscal year (FY) 2010, including $2.3 billion for the DOE Office of Energy Efficiency and Renewable Energy (EERE). That budget aimed to substantially expand the use of renewable energy sources while improving energy transmission infrastructure. It also proposed significant investments in hybrids and plug-in hybrids, smart grid technologies, and scientific research and innovation.

As part of the $789 billion economic stimulus package in the American Recovery and Reinvestment Act of 2009, Congress provided Energy with an additional $38.3 billion for fiscal years 2009 and 2010, adding about 75 percent to Energy's annual budgets. Most of the stimulus spending was in the form of grants and contracts. For fiscal year 2013, each of the operating units of the Department of Energy operated with the following budgets:

Division	Funding
Nuclear Security	$11.5
Energy and Environment	$9.5
Science	$4.9
Management	$0.25
Other	$0.85
Total	$28

In March 2018, Energy Secretary Rick Perry testified to a Senate panel about the Trump administration's DOE budget request for fiscal year 2019. The budget request prioritized nuclear security while making large cuts to energy efficiency and renewable energy programs. The proposal was a $500 million increase in funds over fiscal year 2017. It "promotes innovations like a new Office of Cybersecurity, Energy Security, and Emergency Response (CESER) and gains for the Office of Fossil Energy. Investments would be made to strengthen the National Nuclear Security Administration and modernize the nuclear force, as well as in weapons activities and advanced computing." However, the budget for the Office of Energy Efficiency and Renewable Energy would be lowered to $696 million under the plan, down from $1.3 billion in fiscal year 2017. Overall, the department's energy and related programs would be cut by $1.9 billion.

== Programs and contracts ==
=== Energy Savings Performance Contract ===
Energy Savings Performance Contracts (ESPCs) are contracts under which a contractor designs, constructs, and obtains the necessary financing for an energy savings project, and the federal agency makes payments over time to the contractor from the savings in the agency's utility bills. The contractor guarantees the energy improvements will generate savings, and after the contract ends, all continuing cost savings accrue to the federal agency.

=== Energy Innovation Hubs ===
Energy Innovation Hubs are multi-disciplinary, meant to advance highly promising areas of energy science and technology from their early stages of research to the point that the risk level will be low enough for industry to commercialize the technologies. The Consortium for Advanced Simulation of Light Water Reactors (CASL) was the first DOE Energy Innovation Hub established in July 2010, for the purpose of providing advanced modeling and simulation (M&S) solutions for commercial nuclear reactors.

The 2009 DOE budget includes $280 million to fund eight Energy Innovation Hubs, each of which is focused on a particular energy challenge. Two of the eight hubs are included in the EERE budget and will focus on integrating smart materials, designs, and systems into buildings to better conserve energy and on designing and discovering new concepts and materials needed to convert solar energy into electricity. Another two hubs, included in the DOE Office of Science budget, were created to tackle the challenges of devising advanced methods of energy storage and creating fuels directly from sunlight without the use of plants or microbes. Yet another hub was made to develop "smart" materials to allow the electrical grid to adapt and respond to changing conditions.

In 2012, the DOE awarded $120 million to the Ames Laboratory to start a new EIH, the Critical Materials Institute, which will focus on improving the supply of rare earth elements.

=== Advanced Research Projects Agency-Energy ===
ARPA-E was officially created by the America COMPETES Act, authored by Congressman Bart Gordon, within the United States Department of Energy (DOE) in 2007, though without a budget. The initial budget of about $400 million was a part of the economic stimulus bill of February 2009.

=== High Performance Computing for Energy Innovation (HPC4EI) ===
HPC4EI is an initiative that leverages supercomputing resources from DOE national laboratories to support industry partnerships in advancing energy-efficient manufacturing, materials development, and decarbonisation technologies.

=== Other ===
- DOE Isotope Program - coordinates isotope production
- Federal Energy Management Program
- Foundation for Energy Security and Innovation - a 501(c)(3) organization dedicated to supporting DOE research
- Fusion Energy Sciences - a program to research nuclear fusion, with a yearly budget in 2020 of $670 million, with $250 million of that going to ITER
- GovEnergy - an annual event partly sponsored by the DOE
- Grid Deployment Office - a division dedicated to spreading adoption of grid-enhancing technologies and improving transmission permitting
- National Science Bowl - a high school and middle school science knowledge competition
- Solar Decathlon - an international collegiate competition to design and build solar-powered houses
- State Energy Program
- Weatherization Assistance Program

== List of secretaries of energy ==
#	Name	Term		President served
#	Name	Start	End	President served
1	James R. Schlesinger	August 6, 1977	August 23, 1979	Jimmy Carter
2	Charles W. Duncan, Jr.	August 24, 1979	January 20, 1981	Jimmy Carter
3	James B. Edwards	January 23, 1981	November 5, 1982	Ronald Reagan
4	Donald Paul Hodel	November 5, 1982	February 7, 1985	Ronald Reagan
5	John S. Herrington	February 7, 1985	January 20, 1989	Ronald Reagan
6	James D. Watkins	March 1, 1989	January 20, 1993	George H. W. Bush
7	Hazel R. O'Leary	January 22, 1993	January 20, 1997	Bill Clinton
8	Federico F. Peña	March 12, 1997	June 30, 1998	Bill Clinton
9	Bill Richardson	August 18, 1998	January 20, 2001	Bill Clinton
10	Spencer Abraham	January 22, 2001	January 31, 2005	George W. Bush
11	Samuel W. Bodman	February 1, 2005	January 20, 2009	George W. Bush
12	Steven Chu	January 21, 2009	April 22, 2013	Barack Obama
13	Ernest Moniz	May 16, 2013	January 20, 2017	Barack Obama
14	Rick Perry	March 2, 2017	December 1, 2019	Donald Trump
15	Dan Brouillette	December 4, 2019	January 20, 2021	Donald Trump
16	Jennifer Granholm	February 25, 2021	January 20, 2025	Joe Biden
17	Chris Wright	February 4, 2025	Incumbent	Donald Trump

== See also ==
- Federal Energy Regulatory Commission
- United States federal executive departments
