= Federal Energy Management Program =

The United States Federal Energy Management Program (FEMP) promotes energy efficiency and the use of renewable energy resources at federal sites, helping agencies save energy, save taxpayer dollars, and demonstrate leadership with responsible, cleaner energy choices, because as the largest energy consumer in the United States, the federal government has both a tremendous opportunity and a clear responsibility to lead by example with smart energy management.

== Equipment procurement ==
Use FEMP's product recommendations and other useful tips to help you buy the most efficient equipment for your offices and facilities and programs.

== New constructions and retrofits ==
Learn about how to design high performance buildings that save energy, save money, enhance indoor environmental quality, and help preserve the environment.

== Operations and maintenance ==
Learn how effective operations and maintenance can help you ensure reliability, safety, and energy at relatively low cost.

== Utility management ==
Find up to date information about energy markets, utility restructuring, renewable power purchasing, and load management opportunities that can help you manage costs, improve reliability, and reduce environmental impacts.

== See also ==
- Cognizant Contracting Officer
- White House Council on Environmental Quality
- Energy Savings Performance Contract (ESPC)
- Indefinite delivery indefinite quantity (IDIQ)
- Re-compete
- RFP
