= Hydropower policy of the United States =

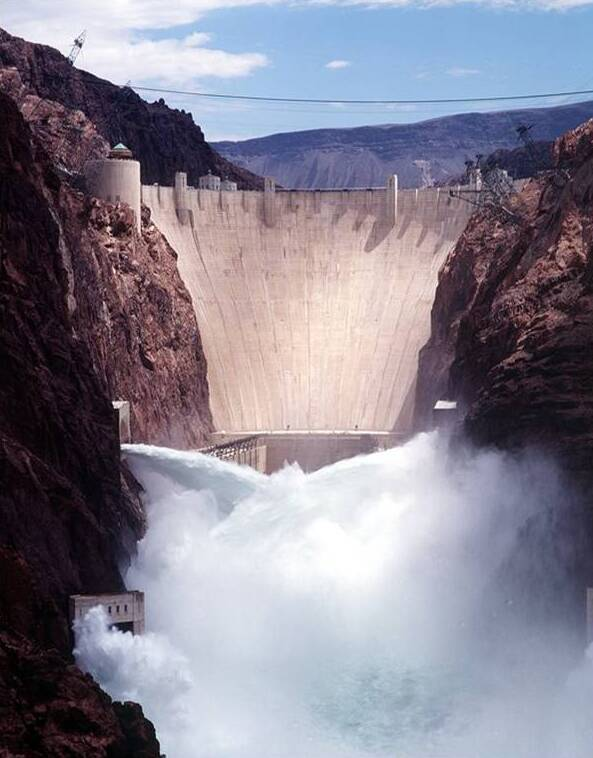
Hoover Dam releasing stored water for other usage downstream

Hydropower policy in the United States includes all the laws, rules, regulations, programs and agencies that govern the national hydroelectric industry. Federal policy concerning waterpower developed over considerable time before the advent of electricity, and at times, has changed considerably, as water uses, available scientific technologies and considerations developed to the present day; over this period the priority of different, pre-existing and competing uses for water, flowing water and its energy, as well as for the water itself and competing available sources of energy have changed. Increased population and commercial demands spurred this developmental growth and many of the changes since, and these affect the technology's use today.

Federal policies regarding the national water resources, within which hydropower exists, were already well-established long before modern electricity was known to exist; as such, previous uses and decisions, as well as government policies and agencies affected how hydropower was later developed. Chief among federal agencies was the involvement of the United States Army Corps of Engineers (USACE). While federal policy regarding interstate waters dates to the constitutional landmark decision under the Commerce Clause in 1824, its implementation was initially limited to development of navigation and its safety, among other demands for such internal improvements. Shortly thereafter, with the General Survey Act the USACE took the lead. By the 1850s and increasingly later, flood control was added to the demands for improvements, as well as recognizing the need to investigate and better understand the science involved. Much of these early improvements were legislated and authorized by rivers and harbors legislation and conducted by the Corps. With the advent of the Progressive Era before the turn of the 20th century, new, different and often competing technical demands were being made for water resource improvements, including irrigation in the western states and demand for the recently developed electric power in all states. Conservation and better utilization of natural resources in a historic relationship, first became topics of concern and consideration for policy at this time.

The hydroelectric industry has been and remains affected by the regulations and interests of various agencies and organizations. Since 1977 the Federal Energy Regulatory Commission (FERC) has been the main regulatory body for the industry. Currently FERC is responsible for licensing new project construction, as well as the re-licensing, and operations oversight of existing projects, including dam safety inspections and environmental monitoring. Environmental concerns and implications are evaluated by both federal and state Natural Resource agencies, Indian tribes, and state water quality agencies. Examples of such federal agencies include, but are not limited to, the Environmental Protection Agency (EPA), the Department of Agriculture's Forest Service, the Department of Commerce’s National Marine Fisheries Service, and the Department of the Interior. The National Hydropower Association is a hydropower trade organization which lobbies for policies which favor the industry.

Advancement of hydroelectric technology is accomplished through research and development programs, such as the Department of Energy's Hydropower Program. The use of hydroelectric technology is promoted by Renewable portfolio standards and various financial incentives. These financial incentives include: Renewable energy Production Tax Credits (PTC), loan Guarantees, Clean Renewable Energy Bond (CREB), and Qualified Energy Conservation Bonds (QECB).

== Background and context ==
Water is required for all life, but since ancient times, mankind has also employed this natural resource for other specifically human productive uses. Millennia ago man learned to navigate on water, learned to dam and divert it for irrigation and build aqueducts and canals to carry it where possible, and learned to convert the power of moving water to mechanical energy to perform work. They also employed basic wind and solar renewable energy for transport and heating. It took time before ancient cities learned to separate water supply from effluent and develop independent drainage for wastewater. Early on, in the United States, the federal government established policy on interstate navigation, with federal policy on flood control and irrigation developing later as outgrowths. Only since the age of electricity, a century ago, have larger scientific and policy concerns been expressed about conservation and the need to view water resources in a larger frame of natural resources generally, of public health aspects of water and its pollution. Federal planning on a broader policy basis began concurrently with the development of the country's hydropower potential. Since WWII, federal hydropower policy has become entwined within these and other broader policy concerns and it has been affected by them considerably; changes in hydropower policy have also attempted to address severe new challenges caused by the level of national energy consumption and questions of energy more globally defined, including its competing types, sources, as well as the sources and safety of competing fuels.

Upon its discovery European colonial and mercantile powers utilized America's great river systems to provide exploration by the navigation of its vast inland rivers. Over time these waterways became the transportation and trading routes which yielded the new world's vast riches, and soon became the object of rivalry between competing colonial powers. With this heritage and its independence the fledgling government wasted little time in establishing control over its borders, with trade in mind. With the country's vast unsettled western frontier, early policy and precedent was set in 1787 in the Northwest Ordinance, which established free usage of its interior waterways and connecting portages; these conditions would be included in the lands of Louisiana Purchase in 1803, which doubled the country's size, and later territorial acquisitions. The many rivers also provided the basis for advantageous settlement because water power was available to build water wheels and develop mills, generally where navigation was impeded by rapids or waterfalls and flow sufficient.

Following the court decision and passage of the General Survey Act, subsequent rivers and harbors acts were passed throughout the 19th century generally, except during financial crises and the Civil War; after the war, internal improvement spending rose considerably, particularly in the eastern states with abundant water resources.

During this time, new demands for flood control improvements began appearing, along with a new source of power from steam. By the 1830s, commercial success of steamboat navigation and transport became widespread and pushed demand for more river and canal improvements. Somewhat later, steam power was mated with wheels needing to be steered, and railroads developed to become another type of internal improvement. With much the same technical expertise as needed for earlier roads and canals, the Corps was assigned involvement; they also initiated scientific studies of rivers and their engineered improvements and structures.

As railroads expanded rapidly farther inland unchallenged, competition developed along previously existing or developed arterial routes, between older and slower navigation systems and the newer and faster railroads. One result over time was their acquisition and closing of existing canals, another result was the development of monopolistic and anti-competitive practices. Where railroads were not so directly involved, the decline in canal traffic developed alternative uses for the water power contained behind these dams and former locks. While these closed canal facilities could not be moved, their water power could be, in a fashion; in some locations the dammed water was otherwise piped through a penstock to multiple nearby locations lower downstream, to provide mechanical hydropower from increasingly more efficient water turbines.

With advancements in steam engine design, stationary units developed to supply power for mills at off-river locations, if a fuel source was available; over time fuels to produce power changed from burning biomass to burning fossil fuels, and the steam donkey could provide power in remote locations. Over this time lighting progressed from candles to whale oil or kerosene and gas if available.

Improving on earlier and less efficient water turbine designs in one historic mill town, the new Francis turbine was created in 1848, using scientific principles and testing methods producing a turbine design of 90% efficiency. More importantly, Francis's mathematical and graphical calculation methods advanced turbine design and engineering and allowed confident design of high efficiency turbines to exactly match a site's flow conditions. In the 1870s and deriving from uses in the mining industry, the high efficiency Pelton wheel impulse turbine was developed to use hydropower under very different flow and pressure conditions. Advances in dam design also progressed, with the completion of Old Aswan Dam being considered a milestone of engineering over nature. At the time of its construction, nothing of such scale had ever been attempted: it also became one of the first dams to be limited by conservation considerations.

== History ==
Legislation specifically regarding hydropower in the United States first appeared in 1901 with the first Federal Water Power Act, which required special permission for a hydroelectric plant to be built and operated on any stream large enough for boat traffic. It was later regulated with the establishment of the Tennessee Valley Authority following the Great Depression in the 1930s.

=== Federal Power Act overview ===
The Federal Power Act was enacted in 1920 with the purpose of organizing and regulating hydroelectric projects at the national level. Hydropower is still a component of this Act, but additional legislation has been added since its creation. The Federal Power Act created the Federal Energy Regulatory Commission (FERC) as the licensing authority for hydroelectric power. Over time, FERC's task list grew to include conservation and protection of natural waterways and the wildlife within them. The Federal Power Act was the first major regulatory legislation for hydropower. The Act also defined what waters FERC had jurisdiction over: "Streams or other bodies of water over which Congress has jurisdiction to regulate commerce among foreign nations and among the States." (16 U.S.C. 796) This basically meant that FERC had unlimited power to oversee activities on any water on US soil.

Subsequent amendments to the Act included some wildlife provisions and more recently, stipulations that called for studies looking into the feasibility of increasing U.S. hydropower capacity using existing dams. This amendment, P.L. 102-486 (106 Stat. 3098), was approved in late 1992 and directs the Secretary of Energy to cooperate with the Secretary of the Interior and the Secretary of the Army and look for cheap ways to maximize power production at federally owned dam facilities. Money for the studies was accounted for in the DOE budget. An amendment in 1995 officially let the Secretary of the Interior and the Secretary of the Army take charge of the studies authorized in the 1992 amendment.

=== The Hydropower Regulatory Efficiency Act of 2013 ===
The Hydropower Regulatory Efficiency Act of 2013 (H.R. 267) was introduced into the United States House of Representatives of the 113th United States Congress on January 15, 2013 and signed into law on August 9, 2013. The act was intended to change some of the regulations in the United States surrounding hydropower by making it easier for smaller hydropower stations to be created. According to the bill's proponents, current regulations are unwieldy and represent a significant hurdle to creating more hydropower plants. H.R. 267 altered those regulations to make it easier for smaller plants to get approval quickly. The legislation also requires the Federal Energy Regulatory Commission (FERC) to study how to further improve the regulatory process. H.R. 267 amended the Public Utility Regulatory Policies Act of 1978 (PURPA) and the Federal Power Act. Previously, hydropower projects the produce 5,000 kilowatts or less of power could avoid having to get certain licenses. H.R. 267 raised that to 10,000 kilowatts, facilitating the speed at which smaller hydropower projects could be built. The existing rules meant that it takes about five years for hydropower projects to get approval, according to hydropower industry sources.

== FERC’s responsibilities ==
FERC is responsible for licensing, relicensing, and oversight of ongoing project operations such as dam safety inspections and environmental monitoring.

=== Licensing/relicensing ===
As outlined on FERC's website, any hydroelectric project must apply for a license or an exemption from licensing if the project is or will be:

1. located on a navigable waterway of the U.S.;
2. occupying U.S. lands;
3. utilizing surplus water or water power from a U.S. government dam; or
4. located on a body of water over which Congress has Commerce Clause jurisdiction, project construction occurred on or after August 26, 1935, and the project affects the interests of interstate or foreign commerce.

Licenses are valid for a 30 to 50-year period. FERC has three processes by which an applicant can file a license: integrated, traditional, and alternative.

==== Integrated licensing process ====
The integrated licensing process is the default licensing process. The integrated licensing process was created to provide a “predictable, efficient, and timely licensing process that continues to ensure adequate resource protections.” FERC says that the process is founded in the following three principles:

1. Early issue identification and resolution of studies needed to fill information gaps, avoiding studies post-filing;
2. Integration of other stakeholder permitting process needs; and
3. Established time frames to complete process steps for all stakeholders, including the Commission.

FERC must give permission if an applicant wishes to use the traditional or alternative process. The regulations for the integrated licensing process are contained in 18 CFR Part 5.

==== Traditional licensing process ====
The traditional licensing process consists of a three-stage pre-filing process through 18 CFR 4.38 for new licenses and 18 CFR 16.8 for relicensing. In the first stage, the applicant issues a notice of intent and a request to use a traditional licensing process. After FERC approves the use of a traditional licensing process, joint agency and public meetings are conducted along with site visits and written comments are accepted.

==== State role in Federal licensing ====
As decided by the U.S. Supreme Court case S.D. Warren Co. v. Maine Board of Environmental Protection, the states have the power to impose restrictions on federal licensing or relicensing of hydropower facilities. The Court decided that a state can impose restrictions through water quality certification under Section 401 of the Clean Water Act. The terms and conditions of a federal license will incorporate the terms and conditions of the state's certification.

==== Exemptions from licensing ====
FERC may issue two types of exemptions from licensing. While facilities that are granted these exemptions are not subject to the requirements of Part 1 of the Federal Power Act, they are still subject to any terms and conditions set by federal and state fish and wildlife agencies and FERC. The two exemptions are the small hydropower project and conduit exemptions.

Small hydroelectric power projects with capacities of 5MW or less may be exempt from federal licensing. These projects must either:

1. utilize the pressure head at a dam “that is not owned or operated by the United States or by an instrumentality of the Federal Government, including the Tennessee Valley Authority” or
2. use “a natural water feature, such as a natural lake, waterfall, or the gradient of a natural stream, without the need for a dam or man-made impoundment and would not retain water behind any structure for the purpose of a storage and release operation.”

Exemptions are available for small conduit hydroelectric facilities with 15MW or less installed generating capacity (or if it's a municipal facility, 40MW or less installed generating capacity). The components of the facility have to exclude the conduit, the associated transmission lines, cannot be “an integral part of a dam”, cannot use a dam to supply its hydrostatic head, and cannot be located on Federal lands. The hydroelectric potential to generate the electricity must be supplied by a conduit. The water discharged by the facility must go into a conduit or be directly used for agricultural, municipal, or industrial consumption.

The term conduit in this context is defined as any tunnel, canal, pipeline, aqueduct, flume, ditch, or similar manmade water conveyance that is operated for the distribution of water for agricultural, municipal, or industrial consumption and not primarily for the generation of electricity.

=== Dam and safety inspections ===
FERC has created a plan for monitoring dam construction and operation called the Dam Safety Surveillance Monitoring Plan (DSSMP). This plan, created with the aid of dam owners, consultants, the National Hydropower Association and the Hydraulic Power Committee, outlines how an owner will monitor the safety and performance of a dam with respect to rules and regulations that govern them.

The plan includes sections on instrumentation, equipment maintenance, reading frequency and procedures, action levels, procedures should a failure occur and how reports sent to FERC must be formatted. The reports include photographs, diagrams and data taken at the dam.

=== Safeguarding the environment ===
In regards to the environment, FERC's objective is to ensure that damage resulting from hydropower projects is minimized. They require that all applicants communicate with all relevant stakeholders before submitting applications. These stakeholders include federal and state Natural Resource agencies, Indian tribes, and state water quality agencies. FERC has developed an Initial Consultation Contact List to facilitate communication. FERC issues draft "Environmental Assessments" or draft "Environmental Impact Statements" and invites the public to comment. Electronic copies of the drafts and final versions are publicly available. In issuing licenses, FERC includes terms and conditions aimed to mitigate environmental impacts.

== Environmental impact ==
The construction of the large dams necessary to harness the power of water starkly change the natural shape of the environment. They can lead to soil erosion, the spread of disease, the loss of species and even, as one scientist claims, a change in the Earth's rotation due to huge amounts of water being moved to reservoirs. Also, the major amounts of concrete needed for these dams mean more CO^{2} being discharged into the atmosphere and promote runoff that limits the recharging ability of underground aquifers that provide potable water. Some legislation that seeks to curb the negative environmental effects of dam-building can be found below.

=== The Endangered Species Act ===
One main hindrance in the licensing process is the Endangered Species Act (7 U.S.C. § 136, 16 U.S.C. § 1531 et seq., ESA). Passed in 1973, this act sought to protect endangered species from the negative effects of anthropogenic actions. It distinguished between endangered and threatened species but applied the same protection to both. The reason it hinders the hydropower licensing and relicensing process is because it has priority over any government activity and therefore supersedes any construction project.

Section 7 of the Act requires that Federal agencies must insure that any action they condone is unlikely to affect the “existence of listed species or modify their critical habitat.” The list alluded to is also found in the Act and shows exactly which species must be considered. The Supreme Court came to the conclusion that Congress sought "to halt and reverse the trend toward species extinction, whatever the cost." The major consequences of the ESA and the Supreme Court's ruling in terms of hydropower proliferation are added costs, delays and site analyses that make dam construction much more difficult and less attractive to investors.

Because of the incredibly high construction and maintenance costs of dams and generation equipment, outside investment is key to the hydropower industry. This means that the ESA is a hindrance to the industry's growth. The protected species are largely aquatic types whose migration patterns and feeding habits might be affected by the construction and subsequent operation of a dam. In the Pacific Northwest, the Columbia River alone has seen the construction of 75 dams between 1930 and 1990. It led to the depletion of salmon populations that have since been added to the Endangered Species Act's list.

Besides getting killed during the construction and operation of dams, salmon stocks are dwindling because harvesting them becomes much easier now that the dams limit movement and increase their density in any one area. Thanks to the ESA, salmon populations have again swelled in the Columbia River and no new dams have been built since 1990.

=== Electric Consumers Protection Act ===
The Electric Consumers' Protection Act (ECPA, 16 U.S.C. § 797, 803) was an amendment to the Federal Power Act and became law in 1986. It contained wildlife provisions, and requires that FERC "give equal consideration to non-power generating values such as the environment, recreation, fish, and wildlife, as are given to power and development objectives when making hydroelectric project licensing decisions." A major consequence of this provision was a large increase in licensing fees since major studies now had to be undertaken before any project was authorized. Another provision stated that FERC must work with fish and wildlife agencies to mitigate the environmental impacts of existing dams.

== Promotion ==
Research and development programs and financial incentives are used to promote hydropower. The financial incentives that exist are: Renewable Energy Production Tax Credits (PTC), loan guarantees, Clean Renewable Energy Bond (CREB), Qualified Energy Conservation Bonds (QECB)

=== The Department of Energy's Hydropower Program ===
The U.S. DOE's Hydropower Program is a part of its Office of Wind and Hydropower Technologies. The Hydropower Program's mission is “to conduct research and development that will improve the technical, societal, and environmental benefits of hydropower and provide cost-competitive technologies that enable the development of new and incremental hydropower capacity.” The research is performed in conjunction with other federal agencies and groups involved with the industry. Progress and results are evaluated through the actions of a technical committee of experts. The three National Laboratories involved with the program include Idaho National Laboratory, Oak Ridge National Laboratory, and Pacific Northwest National Laboratory.

=== Tax credit from efficiency improvements or capacity additions ===
Hydroelectric facilities placed into service after August 8, 2005 and before January 1, 2014 may apply for a tax credit for incremental production gains from efficiency improvements or capacity additions. This tax credit was created by Section 1301 of the U.S. Energy Policy Act of 2005, which amends Section 45 of the Internal Revenue Code of 1986. As outlined by EPAct 2005, the "incremental hydropower production for any taxable year shall be equal to the percentage of average annual hydropower production at the facility attributable to the efficiency improvements or additions of capacity" and shall be "determined by using the same water flow information used to determine an historic average annual hydropower production baseline." This percentage and baseline has to be certified by the Federal Energy Regulatory Commission.

The determination of incremental hydropower production shall not be based on any operational changes at a facility not directly associated with the efficiency improvements or additions of capacity. In Section 1301, “efficiency improvements” and “additions of capacity” are not defined. (It merely excludes “operational changes…not directly associated with the efficiency improvements or additions of capacity”). Therefore, FERC interprets “efficiency improvements” as upgrades to generators or turbines that result in increased power generation. They interpret “additions of capacity” to be “any increase in generating capacity other than an addition resulting from an efficiency improvement or an addition resulting from an operational change.

To acquire certification from FERC, a request must be submitted that includes (taken directly from the outline in):

A. Historic Average Annual Hydropower Production (baseline):

1. A calculation of the historic average annual hydropower production baseline for the facility, along with the supporting water flow information and corresponding actual annual power production data for the period of record. Such calculations must be based on the units operating capacities as authorized under a Commission's license or exemption.

B. Percentage of Average Annual Hydropower Production Attributable to Efficiency Improvements or Additions of Capacity

1. Additions of Capacity: The additional installed capacity and the anticipated annual generation for the facility based on the same water flow information used to support the calculation of Historic Average Annual Hydropower Production baseline in item (A).
2. Efficiency improvements: The manufacturer's calculation of efficiency improvements to the upgraded generating equipment and the anticipated annual generation for the facility based on the same water flow data used to support the calculation of Historic Average Annual Hydropower Production baseline.
3. Calculations showing the percentage of average annual hydropower production attributable to the efficiency improvements or additions of capacity.
4. Proposed in-service date.

=== Loan guarantees ===
The Energy Policy Act and the Recovery Act have created loan programs to support hydropower production and development of other clean energy. In both acts, the loan repayment is required over a period no greater than 30 years or 90% of the projected useful life of the asset being financed.

The innovative Loan Guarantee Program was created by the EPAct Title XVII to “support the deployment of the deployment of innovative, clean energy technologies that reduce, avoid or sequester carbon dioxide & other air emissions.” The Federal government has authorized up to $42.5 billion in loan guarantees.

The Recovery Act allocated $6 billion to offset loan guarantee charges that are paid to the DOE as a risk premium for the guarantee. There is a September 30, 2011 commencement deadline for construction of temporary additions and projects under the loan program in the Recovery Act.

=== Clean Renewable Energy Bonds ===
Clean Renewable Energy Bonds (CREB) are federal loans authorized by the Energy Policy Act of 2005 for the purpose of financing renewable energy projects [DSIRE]. CREBs are not limited to hydropower, and are qualified for use with all technologies listed in the federal renewable energy production tax credit. These interest free federal loans can be issued by electric cooperatives, government entities, and certain lenders. The bondholder receives tax credits as a way of compensating for no interest payments. The current maximum allowable issuance of Clean Renewable Energy Bonds is $2.4 billion.

=== Qualified Energy Conservation Bonds ===
Qualified Energy Conservation Bonds (QECB) are applied to a broader spectrum of projects than Clean Renewable Energy Bonds. These loans are available for building efficiency, renewable energy production, research and development applications, mass transit and public energy efficiency campaigns in addition to the projects that are eligible for CREBs. Unlike CREBs however, QECBs are not subject to U.S. Department of Treasury applications and approvals. The bonds are issued to states based on that state's percentage of the U.S. population. The state then distributes the QECBs among its municipalities and counties with populations of 100,000 or greater.

=== RPS overview for various states ===
Renewable Portfolio Standards are state policies that establish a minimum required percentage of renewable power for electricity generation. There are currently 24 states with RPS policies in place, all of which include hydroelectric power as an eligible technology. The established percentages are targets for full requirement set for a certain year, ranging from 2013 (Vermont and New York) to 2030 (California). Out of the states with RPS policies, Pennsylvania has the lowest required percentage of renewable generation (8%) and Maine has the highest (40%).

== National Hydropower Association policy priorities ==
The National Hydropower Association (NHA) currently has five policy priorities on their agenda. The first is a more efficient regulatory process. They say that an expediting 2-year licensing process for minimal impact projects would allow hydro to be on an “equal footing” with other renewable technologies. The second is a tax credit parity. Hydropower currently receives half of the rate per kWh under the Production Tax Credit, and the NHA thinks that it should be increased such that it is equal with other renewable technologies. The third priority calls for incentivizing renewable electricity production and manufacturing (manufacturing tax credits, Clean and Renewable Energy Bonds, Production and Investment Tax Credits should be extended). They also want a federal clean and renewable energy standard which promotes development. The last priority calls for continued investment in research and development for both conventional and non-conventional hydropower projects.

== See also ==
- Hydraulic power network
