= Hydropower Regulatory Efficiency Act of 2013 =

- Long title: To improve hydropower, and for other purposes.
- Enacted by: the 113th United States Congress

Citations
- Public law: 113-23

Codification
- Acts amended: Public Utility Regulatory Policies Act of 1978; Federal Power Act
- U.S.C. sections amended: 16 U.S.C. § 2705, 16 U.S.C. § 823a, 16 U.S.C. § 2705, 16 U.S.C. § 798

Legislative history
- Introduced in the House as H.R. 267 by Cathy McMorris Rodgers (R–WA) and 8 co-sponsors on January 15, 2013; Committee consideration by House, Energy and Commerce; House, Energy Subcommittee; Senate, Energy and Natural Resources; Passed the House on February 13, 2013 (422-0); Passed the Senate on August 1, 2013 (Unanimous Consent); Signed into law by President Barack Obama on August 9, 2013

The Hydropower Regulatory Efficiency Act of 2013 (H.R. 267) is a Law that was introduced into the United States House of Representatives of the 113th United States Congress on January 15, 2013. It passed the House on February 13, 2013 by a vote of 422-0, and then passed the Senate by unanimous consent on August 1, 2013. President Obama signed the Act into law on August 9, 2013.

The Bill is intended to change some of the regulations in the United States surrounding hydropower by making it easier to develop smaller-output hydropower stations. According to the bill's proponents, current regulations are unwieldy and represent a significant hurdle to creating more hydropower plants. The Bill would alter those regulations to make it easier for smaller plants to get approval quickly. The legislation also requires the Federal Energy Regulatory Commission (FERC) to study how to further improve the regulatory process. The Bill would amend the Public Utility Regulatory Policies Act of 1978 (PURPA) and the Federal Power Act. Currently, hydropower projects that produce 5,000 kilowatts or less of power do not require certain licenses. The Bill would raise that amount to 10,000 kilowatts, facilitating the speed at which smaller hydropower projects could be built. The existing rules mean that it takes about five years for hydropower projects to get approval, according to hydropower industry sources.

Hydropower is a significant source of renewable energy in the United States. The National Hydropower Association (NHA) conducted a study that concluded that "the United States could add approximately 60,000 MW of new hydropower capacity by 2025, potentially creating as many as 700,000 jobs in the process," according to the Committee Report released by the House Energy and Commerce Committee when it referred the Bill to the floor.

== Background ==
A similar bill, H.R. 5892, was introduced in the 112th United States Congress, where it passed the House by a vote of 372-0, but was never voted on in the Senate.

== Procedural history ==
=== House ===
The Bill was introduced into the House on January 15, 2013 by Rep. Cathy McMorris Rodgers (R-WA). It was sent to the United States House Committee on Energy and Commerce and the United States House Energy Subcommittee on Energy and Power. It passed the House by a vote of 422-0 on February 13, 2013.

=== Senate ===
After passing in the House, the Bill was referred to the United States Senate Committee on Energy and Natural Resources on February 14, 2013. A ranking member of the Committee, Sen. Lisa Murkowski (R-AK), told The Hill that she expected the Bill to pass in the Senate as well. Power Magazine also reported that chances for passage in the Senate looked good. The measure passed the Senate by unanimous consent on August 1, 2013.

== Provisions/Elements of the bill ==
This summary is based largely on the summary provided by the Congressional Research Service, a public domain source.

Section 1 of the Bill provides the short title of the bill, "Hydropower Regulatory Efficiency Act of 2013", and gives a table of contents for the bill.

Section 2 of the Bill provides the "Findings" of Congress. It has a short description of facts that Congress lists as a way to provide context for why they are writing the bill and want to make this new law. In this bill, Congress lists the number of Americans who work in the hydropower industry (approximately 300, 000), the number of dams in the United States that are used to produce power (less than 3% of 80, 000), and that hydropower provides 7% of the energy generated in the United States.

Section 3 of the Bill would amend the Public Utility Regulatory Policies Act of 1978 (PURPA) to increase from 5,000 to 10,000 kilowatts the size of small hydroelectric power projects which the Federal Energy Regulatory Commission (FERC) may exempt from its license requirements.

Section 4 of the Bill would amend the Federal Power Act to revise the limitation on the maximum installation capacity of qualifying conduit hydropower facilities that are eligible for an exemption from licensing requirements.

It would also require any person, state, or municipality proposing to construct a qualifying conduit hydroelectricity facility to file with the Federal Energy Regulatory Commission (FERC) a notice of intent to do so. It would require FERC, within 15 days after receiving such a notice of intent, to make an initial determination as to whether the facility meets the qualifying criteria.

The Bill would then waive the license requirements for any Conduit hydroelectricity facility that:

(1) uses for electric power generation only the hydroelectric potential of a non-federally owned conduit,
(2) has a maximum installed capacity of 5 megawatts, and
(3) is not currently licensed or exempted from license requirements.

The bill then redefines "conduit" to specify any tunnel, canal, pipeline, aqueduct, flume, ditch, or similar man-made water conveyance operated for the distribution of water for agricultural, municipal, or industrial consumption and not primarily for the generation of electricity.

The new law would authorize the FERC to:

(1) exempt from license requirements any electric power generation facility that utilizes for such generation only the hydroelectric potential of a conduit, and has an installed capacity or 40 megawatts or fewer; and, in section 5, the FERC would be authorized to
(2) extend the preliminary permit period for up to 2 additional years beyond the 3 years otherwise allowed if it finds that the permittee has implemented activities under the permit in good faith and with reasonable diligence.

Section 6 of the Bill would direct the FERC to:

(1) investigate the feasibility of issuing a license for hydropower development at nonpowered dams and closed loop pumped storage projects during a two-year period, and
(2) hold workshops and develop hydropower pilot projects.

Finally, Section 7 would direct the Department of Energy to study:

(1) the technical flexibility that existing pumped storage facilities can provide to support intermittent renewable electric energy generation, including the potential for such facilities to be upgraded or retrofitted with advanced commercially available technology; and
(2) the technical potential of existing pumped storage facilities and new advanced pumped storage facilities to provide grid reliability benefits. A year after the enactment of the Bill, should it become law, the Department of Energy would be required to submit a report about the results of this study to the United States House Committee on Energy and Commerce and the United States Senate Committee on Energy and Natural Resources and provide any suggestions it has based on the results of the study.

== Perception and impact ==
Some environmental groups, such as American Rivers, support the bill because it primarily addresses only very small power plants, which are less disruptive to the environment than the much larger megadams many environmental groups oppose.

=== Congressional Budget Office ===
The Congressional Budget Office report on the Bill indicates that it would have no significant net impact on the federal budget. The changes made by the bill would reduce the workload for the Federal Energy Regulatory Commission. The studies the bill requires the Department of Energy to make are similar to on-going studies of hydropower and would not require much additional funding.

== See also ==
- Conduit hydroelectricity
- List of dams and reservoirs in the United States
- Hydroelectricity
- Hydropower
- Hydropower policy in the United States
- Hydroelectric power in the United States
- Renewable energy in the United States
- Energy policy of the United States
