= H2 USA =

Alliance promoting US hydrogen technology

H_{2} USA
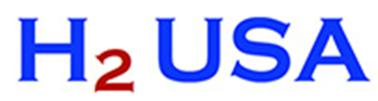
- H_{2} USA organization logo
- Established: May 13, 2013; 13 years ago
- Type: Hybrid organization
- Legal status: Public–private partnership
- Purpose: Energy conservation; Energy transition
- Headquarters: District of Columbia
- Location: Washington, D.C., United States
- Coordinates: 38.90628°N 77.04106°W
- Products: Fuel cell; Fuel cell vehicle; Zero-emissions vehicle
- Services: Energy development; Hydrogen infrastructure
- Fields: Renewable energy; Sustainable energy
- Website: H_{2} USA Website

H_{2} USA is a hybrid organization governed by a partnership affiliated with the United States private sector economy and the public sector services. The alliance is supportive of a hydrogen economy and hydrogen technologies with a representation by more than thirty cooperatives considering associations, automakers, energy companies, fuel cell suppliers, materials and component manufacturers, national laboratories, non-governmental organizations, and the United States Department of Energy.

== See also ==
- Fossil fuel phase-out
- Renewable energy commercialization
- Renewable energy in the United States
- Renewable energy transition
- United States energy independence
- Spark M. Matsunaga Hydrogen Research, Development, and Demonstration Act of 1990
- Energy Policy Act of 1992
- United States hydrogen policy
