= United States hydrogen policy =

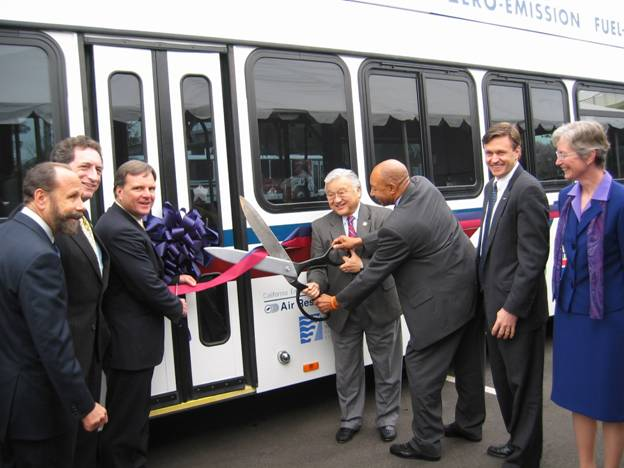
Ribbon cutting for Zero-Emission Hydrogen Fuel Cell Bus Program

The principle of a fuel cell was discovered by Christian Friedrich Schönbein in 1838, and the first fuel cell was constructed by Sir William Robert Grove in 1839. The fuel cells made at this time were most similar to today's phosphoric acid fuel cells. Most hydrogen fuel cells today are of the proton exchange membrane (PEM) type. A PEM converts the chemical energy released during the electrochemical reaction of hydrogen and oxygen into electrical energy. The Hydrogen Research, Development, and Demonstration Act of 1990 and Energy Policy Act of 1992 were the first national legislative articles that called for large-scale hydrogen demonstration, development, and research programs. A five-year program was conducted that investigated the production of hydrogen from renewable energy sources and the feasibility of existing natural gas pipelines to carry hydrogen. It also called for the research into hydrogen storage systems for electric vehicles and the development of fuel cells suitable to power an electric motor vehicle.

== Applications ==
Hydrogen is an energy carrier and can be used to store and deliver energy as needed. When used in a fuel cell, the hydrogen atom dissociates into a positively charged hydrogen ion and a negatively charged electron which is diverted to an electric load. A fuel cell can be used to power anything in much the same way that batteries are used. According to the U.S. Department of Energy, "Eventually hydrogen will join electricity as the major energy carrier, supplying every end-use energy need in the economy, including transportation, central and distributed electric power, portable power, and combined heat and power for buildings and industrial processes."

=== Vehicles ===
Hydrogen fuel cell vehicles were in the pre-production stage of development for many years before being commercialized. While prototype hydrogen vehicles exist worldwide, there are limited consumer-level vehicles available for purchase off the lot. The Toyota Mirai was the first fuel cell car to be available for sale in December 2014. The Honda FCX Clarity was also available to consumers for lease in the Torrance, Santa Monica, and Irvine areas of California for $600/month. Hyundai started selling their fuel cell Nexo in Korea in 2018 and began selling them in California in 2019. Cars are typically refilled with a couple of kilograms over 5–10 minutes.

One vehicular application for hydrogen fuel cells is forklift fleets in manufacturing facilities or distribution centers. Forklifts are not allowed to burn gasoline or diesel fuel inside factories, since the fumes present health hazards, so most indoor fleets rely on batteries. Hydrogen tanks can be refilled faster than charging batteries. A hydrogen fuel cell can be refilled in several minutes. By 2013, there were more than 4,000 fuel cell forklifts in the US. As of 2024, approximately 50,000 hydrogen forklifts are in operation worldwide (the bulk of which are in the U.S.), as compared with 1.2 million battery electric forklifts that were purchased in 2021.

=== Stationary power ===
Hydrogen fuel cells also have the potential to replace or supplement utility-bought electricity by supplying energy on-site in the form of a stationary power device. Major corporations like eBay, Google, Wal-Mart, Coca-Cola, FedEx, Adobe and Sierra Nevada have been using some form of fuel cells for several years and are reporting hundreds of thousands of dollars' worth of energy savings every year.

== Research and development funding ==
The George W. Bush administration showed much interest in developing hydrogen fuel cell technologies within the transportation sector. This interest was mainly driven by the desire to decrease the United States' dependence on foreign oil and reduce the environmental impact of the transportation sector. The initiative to promote fuel cell technology was announced by former President Bush in his State of the Union Address in 2003. Former President Bush stated: "With a new national commitment, our scientists and engineers will overcome obstacles ... so that the first car driven by a child born today could be powered by hydrogen, and pollution-free. Join me in this important innovation to make our air significantly cleaner, and our country much less dependent on foreign sources of energy."

Along with this new national commitment, a Hydrogen Posture Plan was created to begin to map the future of hydrogen technology research, development and demonstration. To accelerate research, development, and demonstration former President Bush announced plans to appropriate $1.2 billion.

On May 11, 2009 President Barack Obama effectively reduced funds and the Bush Administrations' attempt to advance fuel cell vehicle technology and commercialization at a fast pace. The elimination of this appropriation of funds was said to have saved $100 million per year. Department of Energy Secretary Steven Chu said the technology and improvements necessary for deployment of fuel cell vehicles were most likely to not be commercially ready or economically viable after 10 to 15 years of research and development. A more detailed table of public hydrogen research and development funding is provided by the Department of Energy: Hydrogen Program.

== Federal support for hydrogen and fuel-cell R&D ==
=== Freedomcar and fuel partnership plan ===
In March 2006, the FreedomCAR & Fuel Partnership devised a document that stated the Partnership's Plans. The FreedomCAR & Fuel Partnership was formed in 2003 as an expansion of the existing FreedomCAR Partnership. The FreedomCAR Partnership Plan was created by former Secretary of Energy Spencer Abraham and senior executives of DaimlerChrysler Corporation, Ford Motor Company, and General Motors Corporation. The partners consist of the United States Department of Energy (DOE), BP America, Chevron Corporation, ConocoPhillips, Exxon Mobil Corporation, Shell Hydrogen LLC, and the United States Council for Automotive Research (USCAR)—a legal partnership among DaimlerChrysler Corporation, Ford Motor Company, and General Motors Corporation.

The FreedomCAR & Fuel Partnership was created to stimulate research and development for proposed future transportation sector technologies with the goal of minimizing foreign oil dependence. The FreedomCAR & Fuel Partnership allowed for the Cooperative Automotive Research group to "examine and advance the pre-competitive, high-risk research needed to develop the component and infrastructure technologies necessary to enable a full range of affordable cars and light trucks, and the fueling infrastructure for them that will reduce the dependence of the nation's personal transportation system on imported oil and minimize harmful vehicle emissions, without sacrificing freedom of mobility and freedom of vehicle choice." Along with other high risk technologies, hydrogen fuel cell vehicle technology was identified as potential venue for research and development.

=== Energy policy act of 2005 ===
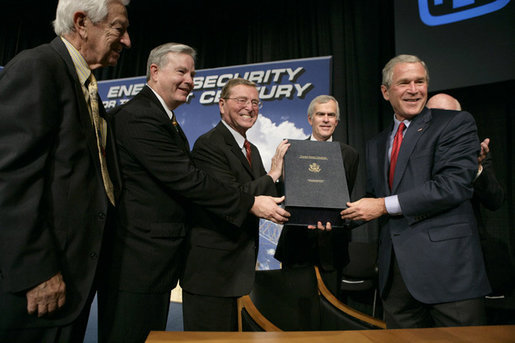
Signing of the

==== Title viii-hydrogen ====
The purposes of Title VIII are: "(1) to enable and promote comprehensive development, demonstration, and commercialization of hydrogen and fuel cell technology in partnership with industry; (2) to make critical public investments in building strong links to private industry, institutions of higher education, National Laboratories, and research institutions to expand innovation and industrial growth; (3) to build a mature hydrogen economy that creates fuel diversity in the massive transportation sector of the United States; (4) to sharply decrease the dependency of the United States on imported oil, eliminate most emissions from the transportation sector, and greatly enhance our energy security; and (5) to create, strengthen, and protect a sustainable national energy economy."

The Energy Policy Act of 2005 calls for a wide-reaching research and development program on technologies relating to the production, purification, distribution, storage, and use of hydrogen energy, fuel cells, and related infrastructure with the goal of demonstrating and commercializing the use of hydrogen for transportation, utility, industrial, commercial, and residential applications. The Secretary is directed to collaborate with private industry, academic institutions and federal agencies to address the many issues related to hydrogen. By 2015 automakers must have made a commitment to offer hydrogen fuel cell vehicles in the mass consumer market and by model year 2020, hydrogen fuel cell vehicles must have achieved higher fuel economy, lower emissions, and the equivalent or improved safety capability of comparable light duty vehicles of model year 2005. The infrastructure goals are similar. The goals of the program are to enable a commitment by 2015 that will lead to infrastructure by 2020 which provides safe refueling capability and widespread availability of hydrogen from domestic energy sources. The act also appropriates funds for hydrogen supply and fuel cell technologies up to year 2020, yet the amounts for each year from 2011 through 2020 are "as necessary".

Section 806 calls for the establishment of a "Fuel Cell Technical Task Force" chaired by the Secretary and with representatives from several Federal Agencies. The Task Force is responsible for planning a safe, economical and environmentally sound hydrogen infrastructure, increasing the use of fuel cells in government, increasing the use of hydrogen in distributed power generation, establishing uniform hydrogen codes, standards and safety protocols, and defining vehicle hydrogen fuel system integrity safety performance.

Section 807 establishes "The Hydrogen Technical and Fuel Cell Advisory Committee" which will contain between 12 and 25 members representing domestic industry, academia, professional societies, government agencies, Federal laboratories, previous advisory panels, and financial, environmental, and other appropriate organizations. The committee is required to review and make recommendations to the Secretary on all things related to hydrogen energy and fuel cells and the Secretary is required to transmit a biennial report to Congress describing these recommendations.

Section 808 calls for the funding of a limited number of demonstration projects that involve using hydrogen at existing facilities, depend on reliable power from hydrogen, lead to the replication of hydrogen technologies and draw such technologies into the marketplace, include vehicle, portable and stationary demonstrations, raise awareness of hydrogen technology among the public, and facilitate identification of optimum hydrogen technology compared to alternatives. The funding for the demonstrations described in this section will come in the form of grants which are scheduled to continue through year 2020.

Section 812 establishes a commitment to explore the production of hydrogen using solar and wind technologies. It calls for 5 projects in each that will develop systems that may be used for the production of electricity or hydrogen, or both in conjunction.

==== Title ix, subtitle c, sec.933 ====
Low-Cost Renewable Hydrogen And Infrastructure For Vehicle Propulsion

Establishes a research, development, and demonstration program for universities and institutions to determine the feasibility of using hydrogen in light-weight vehicles and the integration of the associated infrastructure using off-the-shelf technologies. The universities and institutions must have expertise in testing hydrogen and methane-powered vehicles. By 2007, a vehicle must have been developed that has a curb weight of 2000 lbs or less before modifications that: operates solely on hydrogen, qualifies as a light-duty passenger vehicle and uses hydrogen produced from water using only solar energy.

== Title vi, subtitle e, section 654 ==
H-Prize

This section amends the Energy Policy Act of 2005 in which it adds a new subsection. The Secretary is required to carry out a program to competitively award cash prizes to advance the research, development, demonstration and commercial application of hydrogen energy technologies. The prize competitions are to be widely advertised to attract individuals, universities, and small and large businesses and must include announcements in the Federal Register. The categories that projects must adhere to are as follows: (1) advancements in technologies, components, or systems related to hydrogen production, storage, distribution, utilization; (2) prototypes of hydrogen-powered vehicles or other hydrogen-based products that best meet or exceed objective performance criteria, such as the completion of a race over a certain distance or terrain or generation of energy at certain levels of efficiency and; (3) transformational changes in technologies for the distribution or production of hydrogen that meet or exceed far-reaching objective criteria, which shall include minimal carbon emissions and which may include cost criteria designed to facilitate the eventual market success of a winning technology.

== Code for hydrogen fueling stations ==
Permitting Hydrogen Facilities

- American Society of Mechanical (ASME): Process Piping
- ASME: Gas Transmission and Distribution Systems
- Compressed Gas Association (CGA): Standards for Hydrogen Piping Systems at Consumer Locations
- CGA: Vent Systems
- CGA: Compressed Gas Container Handling
- International Fire Code (IFC)
- international fuel gas code (IFGC)
- National Fire Protection Association (NFPA): Motor Fuel Dispensing Facilities and Repair Garages
- NFPA: Vehicular Fuel Systems Code
- Society of Automotive Engineers (SAE): Compressed Hydrogen Surface Vehicle Refueling Connection Devices

== Code for stationary and backup power facilities ==
- American National Standards Institute (ANSI): Stationary Fuel Cell Power Systems
- International Code Council (ICC): International Building Code
- ICC: International Fire Code
- ICC: International Fuel Gas Code
- NFPA: Standard for the Storage, Use, and Handling of Compressed Gases and Cryogenic Fluids in Portable and Stationary Containers, Cylinders and Tanks
- NFPA: Standard for the Installation of Stationary Fuel Cell Power Systems

== Federal incentives and laws ==
There are several federal incentives and laws regarding hydrogen in the transportation sector. They can be found on the alternative fuels and Advanced Vehicles Data Center with a brief description of each and the reference numbers to access the legislation. The table below links you directly to several federal codes, laws, and legislation for various hydrogen technologies.

Law/Incentive	Reference number
Alternative-fuel and vehicle labeling requirements	Reference 16 CFR 309
Alternative-fuel infrastructure tax credit	26 U.S. Code 30C
Fuel-cell motor vehicle tax credit	Reference 26 U.S. Code 30B
Hydrogen fuel excise tax credit	26 U.S. Code 6426
Improved energy technology loans	Reference 42 U.S. Code 16513

== Hydrogen for stationary applications ==
Several states have energy acts that establish provisions for tax exemptions and corporate income tax credits aimed at promoting infrastructure development that supports hydrogen stationary power technologies. In addition, there are production tax credits that provide corporate income tax credits based on the amount of electricity produced from stationary hydrogen power sources. All state policies, including incentives, tax credits, grants, RPS, interconnection standards, initiatives, and partnerships about stationary hydrogen fuel cell installations can be found on the State Fuel Cell and Hydrogen Database created by FuellCells.org. FuelCells.org also provides a fuel cell Policy Activity Wrapup for fuel cells and hydrogen for the year 2010. This wrap-up includes 2010 legislation and policy only. Several of the incentives and policies involving stationary hydrogen power are explained below.

Colorado: Renewable Energy Standard increased. This new bill boosts Colorado's renewable portfolio standard percentages to achieve 30% renewable generation by 2020. A fuel cell using hydrogen derived from an eligible energy resource is an eligible electric generation technology.

District of Columbia: Net metering cap is raised. Residential or commercial customers with systems powered by renewable energy sources, combined heat and power, fuel cells and microturbines are eligible to net meter up to a maximum capacity of 1 megawatts, raised from 100 kilowatts.

Maryland: Legislation adds fuel cells as eligible net metering resource. House Bill 821 was passed in May 2010, adding fuel cells among the list of eligible customer-generators for net energy metering. System size is limited to 2 megawatts.

New York: Renewable Portfolio Standards: incentives for fuel cell projects. The New York Public Service Commission (NYPSC) made available $30 million in incentives to encourage customer sited projects for large scale projects involving fuel cells. The incentives are generally granted only for installed capacity not exceeding the customer's electrical load. The total value of incentives is capped at $50,000 for systems smaller than 25 kW and $1 million for larger systems.

Net metering and interconnection standards updated. The NYPSC approved tariff filings of the six investor owned utilities in New York to encourage the installation of residential micro CHP and fuel cell electric generation systems that enable homeowners to sell excess power to the utility. New Yorks' net metering rules permit residential fuel cell and CHP installations of up to 10 kW each.

Oklahoma: Renewable energy goal established. Oklahoma established a goal for electric utilities in the state to have 15% of the total installed generation capacity to be derived from renewable sources by 2015. Eligible renewable resources include wind, solar, hydropower, hydrogen, and several others.

West Virginia: Net metering standards implemented. Net metering is available to all retail electricity customers. System capacity limits vary depending on the customer type and the electric utility type. Systems that generate electricity using alternative resources, including hydrogen, are allowed.

== Hydrogen for transportation ==
While the federal government has several hydrogen policies in place for both stationary and mobile hydrogen applications, the states also have their own individual incentives and laws. A database that lists the incentives, laws, and regulations state by state can be found on the U.S. Department of Energy's Alternative Fuels and Advanced Vehicle Data Center's website. The website provides the various laws as well as the statute numbers of the legislation that made the laws active. The table below lists the state incentives, laws, and regulations for hydrogen fuel in the transportation sector state by state. The links will take you to the actual state legislation that codified the laws.

State	Laws and regulations	State incentives	Utility/Private incentives
Alabama	Alternative Fuels Promotion and Information		
Arizona	AFV Dealers Information Dissemination Requirement	Reduced AFV License Tax, Alternative Fuel and AFV Tax Exemption	
California	Hydrogen Highway	Zero Emission Light Duty Vehicle Rebates, Advanced Transportation Financing	AFV and Insurance Discount
Colorado	Clean Energy Development Authority		
Connecticut	Hydrogen and Fuel Cell Promotion		
Delaware	State Agency Energy Plan	Alternative Fuel Tax Exemption	
Florida	Alternative Fuel Economic Development, Alternative Fuels Tax	Hydrogen and Biofuels Investment Tax Credit	
Georgia		AFV Tax Credit, Georgie Code 48-7-40.16	
Hawaii	Hydrogen Energy Plan and Fund		
Idaho		Alternative Fuels Tax Refund	
Illinois	Alternative Fuel Promotion	AFV and Alternative Fuel Rebates	
Indiana		AFV Manufacturer Tax Credit	
Iowa		AFV Demonstration Grants, Code 214A.19, AFV Production Tax Credits	
Maine	AFV and Fueling Infrastructure Loans, Title 10, Sections 1023-K and 1026-A		
Michigan	Vehicle Research and Development Promotion	AFV Research, Development, and Manufacturing Tax Credits	
Minnesota	Hydrogen Energy Plan		
Missouri	Alternative Fuel Promotion	Alternative Fueling Infrastructure Tax Credit	
Montana	Alternative Fuel Promotion	AFV Conversion Tax Credit	
Nebraska	Alternative Fuel User Tax and Registration		
Nevada	Funds for School District Alternative Fuel Use, Statutes 445B.500		
New Hampshire	Alternative Fuel and Advanced Vehicle Study		
New Mexico	Alternative Fuels Tax, Statutes 7-16B		
New York	Alternative Fuel Tax Exemption and Rate Reduction		
North Carolina		Alternative Fuel Tax Exemption	
North Dakota	Alternative Fuel Labeling Requirement	Hydrogen Fuel Tax Exemption	
Ohio	Alternative Fuel Signage		
Oklahoma	Access to State Alternative Fueling Stations, Statute 74-78v1, State Energy Efficiency and Conservation Plans, Statute 27A-3-4-106	AFV Tax Credit, Statute 68-2357.22	
South Carolina		Hydrogen Infrastructure Development Grants	
Tennessee	Energy Task Force, Executive Order 58		
Texas	Provision for Establishment of Hydrogen Program		
Utah		Clean Fuel Vehicle Tax Credit, Code 19-1-402,49-7-605,59-10-1009	
Virginia	Alternative Fuel Research and Development Funding	AFV and Fueling Infrastructure Loans	
West Virginia	Alternative Fuels Studies, Senate Concurrent Resolution 38		
Wisconsin	Alternative Fuel Infrastructure Development	Alternative Fuel Tax Refund for Taxis	

== Programs ==
The US federal government has created several programs to promote alternative fuels including hydrogen. An example of US Department of Energy programs and progress was provided in 2022 in congressional testimony.

== Clean cities ==
The US Department of Energy created Clean Cities to, "advance the energy, economic, and environmental security of the United States by supporting local initiatives to adopt practices that reduce the use of petroleum in the transportation sector". Clean Cities performs these duties through a network of more than 80 offices that develop public/private partnerships to promote alternative fuels, advanced vehicles, fuel blends, hybrid vehicles, and idle reduction. They also provide information about financial opportunities, coordinate technical assistance projects, update and maintain energy databases, publish fact sheets, newsletters, and related technical and informational material.

== State energy program (sep) funding ==
The State Energy Program (SEP) provides grants to states to assist in designing, developing, and implementing renewable energy and energy efficient programs. Each states energy office gets SEP funding and manages all SEP funded projects. For more information about the SEP, including project descriptions, visit the SEP website.

== Clean ports usa ==
Clean Ports USA is an incentive-based program designed to help reduce emissions by encouraging port authorities to redesign and replace older diesel engines with new technologies and cleaner fuels. The U.S. Environmental Protection Agency's National Clean Diesel Campaign offers funding to port authorities to help them overcome the obstacles that prevent the adoption of cleaner diesel technologies.

== Clean construction usa ==
Clean Construction USA promotes the reduction of diesel exhaust emissions from construction equipment and vehicles. They do so by promoting proper operations and maintenance, use of emission-reducing technologies, and use of cleaner fuels. It is part of the U.S. Environmental Protection Agency's National Clean Diesel Campaign, which helps fun for clean diesel construction equipment projects.

== Clean agriculture usa ==
Clean Agriculture USA promotes the reduction of diesel exhaust emissions from agricultural equipment and vehicles by promoting proper operations and maintenance by farmers, ranchers, and agribusinesses. It is also part of the National Clean Diesel Campaign.

== Air pollution control program ==
The Air Pollution Control Program helps state and local agencies in planning, developing, establishing, improving, and maintaining adequate programs for prevention and control of air pollution. Plans emphasize alternative fuels, vehicle maintenance, and transportation choices to reduce miles traveled. Eligible applicants may receive funding for up to 60% of project costs. Reference 42 U.S. Code 7405 is the law that created the grant for support of air pollution planning and control programs.

== Alternative transportation in parks and public lands program ==
The Alternative Transportation in the Parks and Public Lands Program provides funding to support public transportation projects in parks and on public lands. The goal is to include conservation of natural, historical, and cultural resources, and reduced congestion and pollution. The FTC administers the program while partnering with the Department of the Interior and the Forest Service. Eligible projects include capital and planning expenses for alternative transportation systems such as clean fuel shuttle vehicles. Reference 49 U.S. Code 5320 is the law that created program.

== National fuel cell bus program (nfcbp) ==
The goal of the NFCBP is to assist in the development of commercially viable fuel cell bus technologies and related infrastructure with funding awarded through a competitive grant process. Consideration is given to those that have managed advanced transportation projects, including projects related to hydrogen and fuel cell public transportation operations for a period of at least five years. Reference 49 U.S. Code 5309 is the law that created the program.

== Congestion mitigation and air quality (cmaq) improvement program ==
The CMAQ program funds state departments of transportation (DOTS), municipal planning organizations, and transit agencies for projects and programs in air quality maintenance to reduce transportation related emissions. Eligible activities include traffic flow improvements, idle reduction equipment, development of alternative fueling infrastructure, etc. Reference 23 U.S. Code 149 is the law that created the program.

== Clean fuels grant program ==
The Clean Fuels Grant Program assists in achieving or maintaining the National Ambient Air Quality Standards through grant funding. The program accelerates the deployment of advanced bus technologies by supporting the use of low-emission vehicles in transit fleets. It assists in constructing alternative fuel statins, modifying garage facilities to accommodate clean fuel vehicles, and assisting with the use of biodiesel. For more information, visit the Clean Fuels Grant Program fact sheet. Reference 49 U.S. Code 5308 is the law that created the program.

== Transit emissions and energy reduction assistance ==
The Transit Investments for Greenhouse Gas and Energy Reduction (TIGGER) program works with public transit agencies to create strategies for reducing greenhouse gas emissions and energy use from transit operations. Eligible projects include on board vehicle energy management such as energy storage, regenerative braking, fuel cells, and turbines.

== Public perception: potential future policy ==
Public understanding of Hydrogen will have a tremendous impact on current as well as future policy initiatives for vehicle as well as portable and stationary applications. Numerous studies have been performed to analyze the public’s current perception and understanding of hydrogen. Most energy producing technologies have an attached combination of positive and negative stigmas and means of understanding by the general public. For example, individuals who are aware of the environmental effects of a possible nuclear meltdown may deem nuclear power as a negative entity. On the contrary, individuals who are aware of the quantities of carbon emissions being reduced by using one less fossil fuel driven power plant may find nuclear power as a positive entity. A combination of scientific understanding with common associated social themes anchored by pre-existing knowledge will have a significant impact on the future hydrogen policy.

Many studies have been carried out on the topic of Hydrogen Public Perception and degree of acceptance. The Institute for Social, Cultural and Public Policy Research at the University of Salford, evaluated a variety of survey based studies and performed a critical analysis of these selected findings. The article emphasizes that public perception is largely formed on an overall uneducated or misinformed hydrogen knowledge base. Dr. Miriam Ricci states within the article that "Providing factual information on the whole hydrogen chain, not just applications, and the implications it might have on the lives of citizens it may have is a necessary first step." This conclusion reached by many other scholars has been implemented in current US Hydrogen Policy through the appropriations of hydrogen demonstration and public outreach funding described in section 808 of the Energy Policy Act of 2005.

Another concern presented by the Institute for Social, Cultural and Public Policy Research at the University of Salford is that of public distrust of government regulatory committees. In a free-association based survey carried out by Fionnguala Sherry-Brennan of the Manchester Architecture Research Centre (MARC) at the University of Manchester, residents from Unst, Shetland, home of a wind-hydrogen electricity system, were asked to describe words that came to mind when thinking about hydrogen. The survey concluded that details regarding the properties of hydrogen were largely unknown with 9.1 percent of the study population associating the word "hydrogen" with "bomb" and 0.6 percent of the study population associating it with the word "safe." However, there were few safety concerns regarding the use of hydrogen on the island. Concerning a possible hydrogen economy there are safety concerns that need to be addressed, some of which have informed current policy and regulations regarding refueling stations and hydrogen production stations as mentioned earlier in this article.
