= Open Access Same-Time Information System =

Data portal linking generators to transmission markets in the U.S.

The Open Access Same-Time Information System (OASIS) is an Internet-based system for obtaining services related to electric power transmission in North America. It is the primary means by which high-voltage transmission lines are reserved for moving wholesale quantities of electricity. The OASIS concept was originally conceived with the Energy Policy Act of 1992, and formalized in 1996 through Federal Energy Regulatory Commission (FERC) Orders 888 and 889.

== Before OASIS ==
Electric utility systems in North America developed over time as regulated monopolies, jurisdictional utilities given rights to own and operate transmission and distribution networks in a given geographical area along with the responsibility to serve all loads in that same area. At first, utility companies generally served their own system load demand by building local power generation facilities within their systems. Social, economic, and ecological influences later led to new arrangements where a utility company might enter into long-term power purchase or sale agreements with neighboring utility companies, or locate new generation facilities outside of their system and enter into long-term agreements for transmission rights to deliver that energy to their own system. In the short-term world of day-to-day operations, utility companies would agree to "preschedule" (day ahead) or "real time" (same day or next hour) energy transactions with adjacent companies to supplement their own generation asset capabilities.

=== Vertically Integrated Utilities ===
As utility companies began integrating their operations in more complex ways with their neighbors, they evolved into a vertical organizational structure with three tiers: Generation, Transmission, and Scheduling. On a day-to-day or day-ahead operational level these functions might be performed by three or more people at large utilities, but might be combined into a single employee's job at a small utility. The size of the back office support for each function varies greatly depending upon the size of the utility.

==== Generation ====
The generation group manages the maintenance and operations of generation assets, with an eye on the future regarding when, where and how much generation assets will need to be developed to keep up with future demand.

==== Transmission ====
The transmission group concerns itself with maintaining the high voltage transmission system and lower voltage distribution system. As load demands increase or new generation assets come online in their systems, they upgrade existing facilities or construct new transmission corridors to maintain the reliable delivery of energy.

==== Scheduling ====
The scheduling group is responsible for ensuring that there is adequate power supply to meet the demand of the customer load on a day-to-day and hour-to-hour basis, and also for procuring resources to meet long term needs. These resources can be procured through the generation group, or through purchases and sales with other companies.

=== Internal Customers ===
Unlike a typical residential or commercial/industrial customer, large bulk users of electricity such as mills, mines and large factories generally have the opportunity to negotiate the rates they will pay their supplier for electricity. In some cases they might even have their own generation assets as well. If they chose to use their supplier's generation instead of their own, they might also be required to pay a fee for the transmission to deliver it, since that transmission might be built specifically to serve their needs. Fees for services provided by the transmission group were defined in a pro forma tariff, a document the transmission group supplied that detailed requirements and responsibilities for the purchaser and provider, and definitions and costs of the types of transmission services available.

== Impact of the Energy Policy Act of 1992 ==
The Energy Policy Act of 1992 (EPAct) laid the initial foundation for the eventual deregulation of the North American electricity market. This Act called for utility companies to allow external entities fair access to the electric transmission systems in North America. The act's intent was to allow large customers (and in theory, every customer) to choose their electricity supplier and subsequently pay for the transmission to deliver it from the generation to serve their load.

Based on the premise that new generating facilities would be allowed fair access to their regional transmission system, and precipitated by the EPAct of 1992, construction of new independently owned generation assets began in response to the development of the North American electricity market. Recognizing competition was coming, electric utility companies began modifying their scheduling functions by forming affiliated Power Marketing departments. Similarly, financial trading interests and existing energy companies (outside of electricity) saw the opportunities in the emerging electricity market and began to organize unaffiliated power marketing divisions. With open access, anyone with the proper resources and/or creditworthiness could purchase the rights to generation, move it across the transmission network (provided adequate capacity was available), and deliver it to a place of higher demand.

Following passage of the EPAct of 1992, independent generation owner/operators (also called independent power producers or IPPs) and unaffiliated power marketers lodged frequent complaints with FERC about unfair treatment under the new open access requirements. The complaints generally followed the same theme: vertically integrated electric utility companies would favor their own affiliated power marketing division over external parties trying to move power on the system. In many cases, the power marketers operated side by side with the transmission operators (or it might even be the same person) and there were no rules to prevent unfair treatment of external transmission system users.

== FERC Orders 888 and 889 ==
To protect and promote generation competition and also enforce fair treatment of external users of the transmission system, FERC issued Order 888 and Order 889 on April 24, 1996. The EPAct of 1992 was the beginning of electric deregulation in North America, but Orders 888 and 889 marked the point where the trading of electricity gained a firm foothold.

=== Order 888, the "Open Access" order ===
Order 888's primary objective was to establish and promote competition in the generation market, by ensuring fair access and market treatment of transmission customers. FERC outlined six points to accomplish this goal:

- Require all jurisdictional utilities (within the United States) to file an open-access transmission tariff (OATT)
- Require investor-owned utilities (IOU's) to functionally unbundle wholesale generation and power marketing from transmission services
- Create Independent System Operators (ISO's) and operating guidelines
- Encourage reciprocity for non-jurisdictional (i.e., municipalities and cooperatives) utilities
- Allow utilities to recover stranded costs
- Identify ancillary services and comparable services to properly operate the bulk power system

One fairly immediate result of this order was the functional separation and isolation of the power schedulers and power marketers within vertically integrated utilities from their company's area of transmission operations. Affiliated power marketers could no longer work alongside the transmission operators who were charged with treating them and external parties equally, and at the same time affiliated power marketers would no longer have any "inside information" on the availability of the transmission system nor the transactions being scheduled on it.

=== Order 889, the "Standards of Conduct" order ===
Order 889 went to great lengths to detail exactly how all participants in the electricity market should interact with transmission providers. It laid out the structure and function of what became known as OASIS "nodes," which are secure, web-based interfaces to each transmission system's market offerings and transmission availability announcements. Each OASIS node was to be the single point of information dissemination to the market as well as the customer portal for transmission service requests (TSR), even for affiliated power marketers wanting access to their own parent company's transmission.

== OASIS Nodes ==
OASIS nodes are entirely web-based, and public access is limited. Power marketers that become signatories to a transmission provider's OATT gain more complete access so they can view existing transmission and service availability and existing service requests made by other parties. There are also market observers who have read-only access, who may view activity but not request services.

Transmission facilities have power transfer limits that must be maintained to allow the power grid to operate reliably. Transmission operators perform system studies in various future time frames to determine how much transfer capacity is required to serve their own "native load", and how much capacity must remain as a buffer to prevent unscheduled or accidental overflows that can damage high voltage equipment. The difference between the capacity needed to serve load and to maintain safe flow margins can be made available for purchase on the OASIS node.

Unplanned outages and other system emergencies can adversely impact the total power transfer capability across transmission systems, and it sometimes becomes necessary for transmission providers to curtail power flows across the system by revoking transmission rights given to buyers on the OASIS. Some transmission buyers are willing to pay higher rates to avoid having their transactions curtailed, and as such transmission companies offer different priorities of transmission service at varying rates. The least expensive type of transmission is generally "non-firm" and purchased on an hour to hour basis. Daily non-firm is a slightly higher priority (because the buyer committed to purchasing all day), and increments go up from there to weekly, monthly, seasonally, yearly, or longer with the cost for each also rising incrementally. "Firm" transmission services are even more expensive, but are the last transactions to be curtailed.

Even before the appearance of the OASIS nodes, many groups of transmission owners had already turned over operational control of their collective bulk transmission systems to Independent System Operators of various forms. These ISO's offered OASIS access to their collective systems very early on, so that it was often possible to make a single OASIS transmission service request that could cross multiple transmission systems. Since the inception of OASIS, and under the prodding of FERC to move transmission assets under the control of ISO's, the number of OASIS nodes is decreasing as ISO's assume control of transmission systems and consolidate their related OASIS functions.

== OASIS impacts ==
After the doors opened to allow power marketers to move their electricity purchases across multiple transmission systems, many transmission operators saw their transmission systems loaded to much higher levels. Even though transmission services are generally obtained "point-to-point", in actuality power flows divide among numerous paths according to the properties of electricity and thus the actual energy flows follow the path of least resistance—actually the flows are based on the relative (not least) inverse of the resistances in parallel circuits.

A result of the long distance electricity transactions being scheduled was the impact of "loop flows" caused by energy flowing on these alternate paths. Transmission system operators were faced with a dilemma: The problems were often being caused by external influences, and the only way available to them to reduce the stress on the transmission system was to curtail their own transmission sales. This resulted in a loss of revenue and still did not always solve the overloading problems.

The North American Electric Reliability Corporation (NERC) stepped in to address this new problem that threatened the North American power grid by introducing the NERC Tagging application. NERC Tags captured entire transactions from beginning to end. This let them string together all the transmission legs obtained on various OASIS nodes, and then determine how the total schedule impacted transmission systems, and what priorities of transmission were used in the schedule. This let them determine which schedules should be curtailed to relieve loading on transmission systems.

NERC also assumed initial control of the Transmission System Information Networks (TSIN), a database of electric power system data. In 2012 the North American Energy Standards Board (NAESB), an industry council, assumed responsibility for TSIN. It is now the "OATI Web Registry" and requires that users be registered. The registry is a web-based database containing a comprehensive listing of generation points, transmission facilities and delivery points as well as transmission and generation priority definitions with regard to the applications that use it (the various OASIS nodes as well as the NERC Tagging application).

== See also ==
- United States energy
- ISO RTO
- Independent system operator (ISO)
- Regional transmission organization (RTO)
- Transmission system operator (TSO)
