= Federal Power Act =

American hydroelectricity legislation

66th United States Congress
- Long title: An Act to provide for the regulation of interstate commerce in the public interest
- Enacted by: 66th United States Congress
- Enacted: June 10, 1920

Amended by
- Various amendments, including the Energy Policy Act of 2005

Summary
- The Federal Power Act, initially enacted as the Federal Water Power Act, established the Federal Power Commission (now the Federal Energy Regulatory Commission) as the licensing authority for hydroelectric projects in the United States. It regulates interstate electricity transmission, wholesale power sales, and reliability of electric service.
- Status: In force (amended)

The Federal Power Act is a law appearing in Chapter 12 of Title 16 of the United States Code, entitled "Federal Regulation and Development of Power". Enacted as the Federal Water Power Act on June 10, 1920, and amended many times since, its original purpose was to more effectively coordinate the development of hydroelectric projects in the United States. Representative John J. Esch (R-Wisconsin) was the sponsor.

== Background ==
Prior to this time and despite federal control of navigable waters and the necessary congressional approval to construct such facilities, Congress had left the regulation of hydroelectric power to the individual states. The first federal legislation broadly dealing with hydroelectric development regarded its competition with navigation usage; with the passage of the Rivers and Harbors Act of 1899 Congress made it illegal to dam navigable streams without a license (or permit) from them. Until 1903, these congressional permits were given away on a 'first come first served' perpetual basis and controlled by the individual states. This would lead to a long debate between competing private and public development interests, and culminate in the act's passage in 1920.

== Overview ==
The act created the Federal Power Commission (FPC) (now the Federal Energy Regulatory Commission) as the licensing authority for these plants. The FPC regulated the interstate activities of the electric power and natural gas industries, and coordinated national hydroelectric power activities. The Commission's mandate called for it to maintain reasonable, nondiscriminatory and just rates to the consumer. It was ensured that 37.5% of the income derived from hydroelectric power leases given out under the Water Power Act of 1920 went to the state in which the dam was built.

The Federal Energy Regulatory Commission (FERC) regulates under Parts II and III of the Federal Power Act.

In 1935, the law was renamed the Federal Power Act, and the FPC's regulatory jurisdiction was expanded to include all interstate electricity transmission and wholesale power sales (a/k/a "sales for resale"). The Energy Policy Act of 2005 further amended the Federal Power Act to extend FERC's jurisdiction to certain power plant sales as well as the reliability of electric service.

Other amendments to the law include the following:

- Public Utility Regulatory Policies Act (PURPA) (1978)
- Energy Security Act (1980)
- Electric Consumers Protection Act of 1986
- Energy Policy Act of 1992
- America's Water Infrastructure Act of 2018

== See also ==
- Energy law#United States
- United States Department of Energy#Related legislation
- Hydropower Regulatory Efficiency Act of 2013 (H.R. 267; 113th Congress) – a proposed bill from the 113th United States Congress that would amend the Federal Power Act
- FERC v. Electric Power Supply Ass'n – A challenge to the act
