= Tax Relief, Unemployment Insurance Reauthorization, and Job Creation Act of 2010 =

2010 Tax Relief Act

- Long title: An act to amend the Internal Revenue Code of 1986 to extend the funding and expenditure authority of the Airport and Airway Trust Fund, to amend title 49, United States Code, to extend authorizations for the airport improvement program, and for other purposes.
- Enacted by: the 111th United States Congress
- Effective: (various dates for different provisions)

Citations
- Public law: Public Law 111-312
- Statutes at Large: 124 Stat. 3296

Codification
- Acts amended: Economic Growth and Tax Relief Reconciliation Act of 2001; Jobs and Growth Tax Relief Reconciliation Act of 2003; American Recovery and Reinvestment Act of 2009; Energy Policy Act of 2005; Energy Policy Act of 1992; Public Utility Regulatory Policies Act of 1978; Public Utility Holding Company Act of 1935
- Titles amended: 16 U.S.C.: Conservation; 42 U.S.C.: Public Health and Social Welfare
- U.S.C. sections amended: 16 U.S.C. ch. 46 § 2601 et seq. 42 U.S.C. ch. 134 § 13201 et seq. 42 U.S.C. ch. 149 § 15801 et seq.

Legislative history
- Introduced in the House as H.R. 4853 by James Oberstar (D–MN) on March 16, 2010 (in unrelated form); subsequently introduced December 1, 2010 (in this form); Passed the Senate on December 15, 2010 (81–19); Passed the House on December 16, 2010 (277–148); Signed into law by President Barack Obama on December 17, 2010

The Tax Relief, Unemployment Insurance Reauthorization, and Job Creation Act of 2010 (Pub. L. 111–312 (text) (PDF), H.R. 4853, 124 Stat. 3296, enacted December 17, 2010), also known as the 2010 Tax Relief Act, was passed by the United States Congress on December 16, 2010, and signed into law by President Barack Obama on December 17, 2010.

The Act centers on a temporary, two-year reprieve from the sunset provisions of the Economic Growth and Tax Relief Reconciliation Act of 2001 (EGTRRA) and the Jobs and Growth Tax Relief Reconciliation Act of 2003 (JGTRRA), together known as the "Bush tax cuts." Income taxes would have returned to Clinton administration-era rates in 2011 had Congress not passed this law. The Act also extends some provisions from the American Recovery and Reinvestment Act of 2009 (ARRA or 'the Stimulus'). The act also includes several other tax- and economy-related measures intended to have a new stimulatory effect, mostly notably an extension of unemployment benefits and a one-year reduction in the FICA payroll tax, as part of a compromise agreement between Obama and Congressional Republicans. The overall monetary impact of the measure has been placed at $858 billion.

The law was also known, during its earlier formulation in the House of Representatives, as the Middle Class Tax Relief Act of 2010. The package has been referred to as the "Obama-GOP tax deal" as well as the "Obama tax cuts".

== Provisions ==
Key aspects of the law include:

- Extending the EGTRRA 2001 income tax rates for two years. Associated changes in itemized deduction and personal exemption rules are also continued for the same period. The total negative revenue impact of this was estimated at $186 billion.
- Extending the EGTRRA 2001 and JGTRRA 2003 dividends and capital gains rates for two years. The total negative revenue impact of this was estimated at $53 billion.
- Patching the alternative minimum tax to ensure an additional 21 million households will not face a tax increase. This was done by increasing the exemption amount and making other targeted changes. The negative revenue impact of this measure was estimated at $136 billion.
  - The above three measures are intended to provide relief to more than 100 million middle-class families and prevent an annual tax increase of over $2,000 for the typical family.
- A 13-month extension of federal unemployment benefits. The cost of this measure was estimated at $56 billion.
- A temporary, one-year reduction in the FICA payroll tax. The normal employee rate of 6.2 percent is reduced to 4.2 percent. The rate for self-employed individuals is reduced from 12.4 percent to 10.4 percent. The negative revenue impact of this measure was estimated at $111 billion.
- Extension of the Child Tax Credit refundability threshold established by EGTRRA, ARRA, and other measures. According to the White House, this would benefit 10.5 million lower-income families with 18 million children.
- Extension of ARRA's treatment of the Earned Income Tax Credit for two years. According to the White House, this would benefit 6.5 million working parents with 15 million children.
- Extension of ARRA's American opportunity tax credit for two years, including extension of income limits applied thereto. According to the White House, this would benefit more than 8 million students and their families.
  - The above three provisions, as well as some other similar ones, are intended to provide about $40 billion in tax relief for the hardest-hit families and students.
- An extension of the Small Business Jobs and Credit Act of 2010's "bonus depreciation" allowance through the end of 2011, and an increase in that amount from that act's 50 percent to a full 100 percent. For the year of 2012, it returns to 50 percent. The White House hopes the 100 percent expensing change will result in $50 billion in new investments, thus fueling job creation.
- An extension of Section 179 depreciation deduction maximum amounts and phase-out thresholds through 2012.
  - Together, the above two business incentive measures were estimated to have a negative revenue impact of $21 billion.
- Various business tax credits for alternative fuels, such as the Volumetric Ethanol Excise Tax Credit, were also extended. Others extended were credits for biodiesel and renewable diesel, refined coal, manufacture of energy-efficient homes, and properties featuring refueling for alternate vehicles. Also finding an extension was the popular domestic Nonbusiness Energy Property Tax Credit, but with some limitations.
- Estate tax adjustment. EGTRRA had gradually reduced estate tax rates until there was none in 2010. After sunsetting, the Clinton-era rate of 55 percent with a $1 million exclusion was due to return for 2011. The compromise package sets for two years a rate of 35 percent with an exclusion amount of $5 million. The negative revenue impact of this provision was estimated at $68 billion.
- An extension of the 45G short line tax credit, also known as the Railroad Track Maintenance Tax Credit, through January 1, 2012. This credit had been in place since December 31, 2004 and allowed small railroad companies to deduct up to 50% of investments made in track repair and other qualifying infrastructure investments.

== Legislative history ==
The years leading up to 2010 were filled with speculation and political debate about whether the Bush tax cuts should be extended, and if so, how. Rolling back the cuts for the wealthiest taxpayers had been one of the core promises of Obama's 2008 presidential campaign.

The issue came to a head during the lame duck session of the 111th Congress. At the "Slurpee Summit" of November 30, 2010, President Obama appointed Treasury Secretary Tim Geithner and Office of Management and Budget chief Jack Lew to help Republicans and Democrats hammer out an agreement on extending the Bush tax cuts. President Obama wanted to extend the tax cuts for taxpayers making less than $250,000 a year. Congressional Republicans agreed but also wanted to extend the tax cuts for those making over that amount. Indeed, all 42 Republican senators joined in saying that, until the tax dispute was resolved, they would filibuster to prevent consideration of any other legislation, except for bills to fund the U.S. government.

The Middle Class Tax Relief Act of 2010 originated in the Democratic caucus within the House in early December 2010, and proposed to extend the Bush tax cuts for "middle incomes", meaning those earning under $250,000 for joint filers (and for singles, those earning under $200,000). It would restore the previous, higher rates for those "high income" people above that mark. A second proposal raised the dividing line to $1 million. Both proposals were able to pass in the House, but on December 4, 2010, both fell short in the Senate, getting only 53 votes and not the 60 needed for cloture.

On December 6, 2010, President Obama announced that a compromise tax package proposal had been reached with the Republican congressional leadership. This centered around a temporary, two-year extension of the Bush tax cuts and included additional provisions designed to promote economic growth. This proposal was identical to what became law.

In announcing the agreement, the president said, "I'm not willing to let working families across this country become collateral damage for political warfare here in Washington. And I'm not willing to let our economy slip backwards just as we're pulling ourselves out of this devastating recession. ... So, sympathetic as I am to those who prefer a fight over compromise, as much as the political wisdom may dictate fighting over solving problems, it would be the wrong thing to do. ... As for now, I believe this bipartisan plan is the right thing to do. It's the right thing to do for jobs. It's the right thing to do for the middle class. It is the right thing to do for business. And it's the right thing to do for our economy. It offers us an opportunity that we need to seize."

At a press conference the next day, Obama strongly defended the compromise agreement, after numerous congressional Democrats had strongly objected to aspects of it. Obama labelled Republicans as "hostage takers" for forcing the situation, but also lashed out at liberal Democratic opponents of the deal as "sanctimonious" purists and compared it to their unhappiness over the lack of a public option in the health care reform legislation the previous year. His stance led to immediate speculation among pundits that he was engaging in political triangulation, akin to what President Bill Clinton had done following the 1994 Republican Revolution. The White House denied any such thing was happening.

Sanders spoke for over eight hours in his December 2010 filibuster

Administration officials such as Vice President Joe Biden worked to convince the wary Democratic members of Congress to accept the plan, notwithstanding a continuation of lower rates for the highest-income taxpayers. On December 10, Democratic-caucusing independent Senator Bernie Sanders made a filibuster-like stand against the compromise tax proposal, speaking for over eight hours and mocking the need for the wealthy to own multiple homes. Overall, the compromise proved widely popular in public opinion polls, with two-thirds support or more among self-described liberals, moderates, and conservatives, and it allowed Obama to portray himself as a consensus-builder not beholden to the liberal wing of his party.

The bill was opposed by some of the most conservative members of the Republican Party as well as by talk radio hosts such as Rush Limbaugh and some groups in the Tea Party movement. It was also opposed by several leading potential candidates for the Republican nomination in the 2012 presidential election, including Sarah Palin and Mitt Romney, typically on the grounds that it did not make the Bush tax cuts permanent and that it would overall increase the national deficit.

The cut of the FICA payroll tax in the agreement was for one year only at a two percent reduction. This tax holiday was intended as an economic stimulus by Obama and the Democrats, with the value of boosting the disposable income of American families. It would not worsen the Social Security program's financial strength, as the shortfall would be made up from general revenues. Some Republicans thus criticized the idea for increasing the national deficit. Some Democrats were also wary of the notion, either because they thought the return to the normal rate one year hence would be characterized as a politically unpalatable "tax hike", or because they feared that reductions in the payroll tax would undermine the basic model that Social Security was based on.

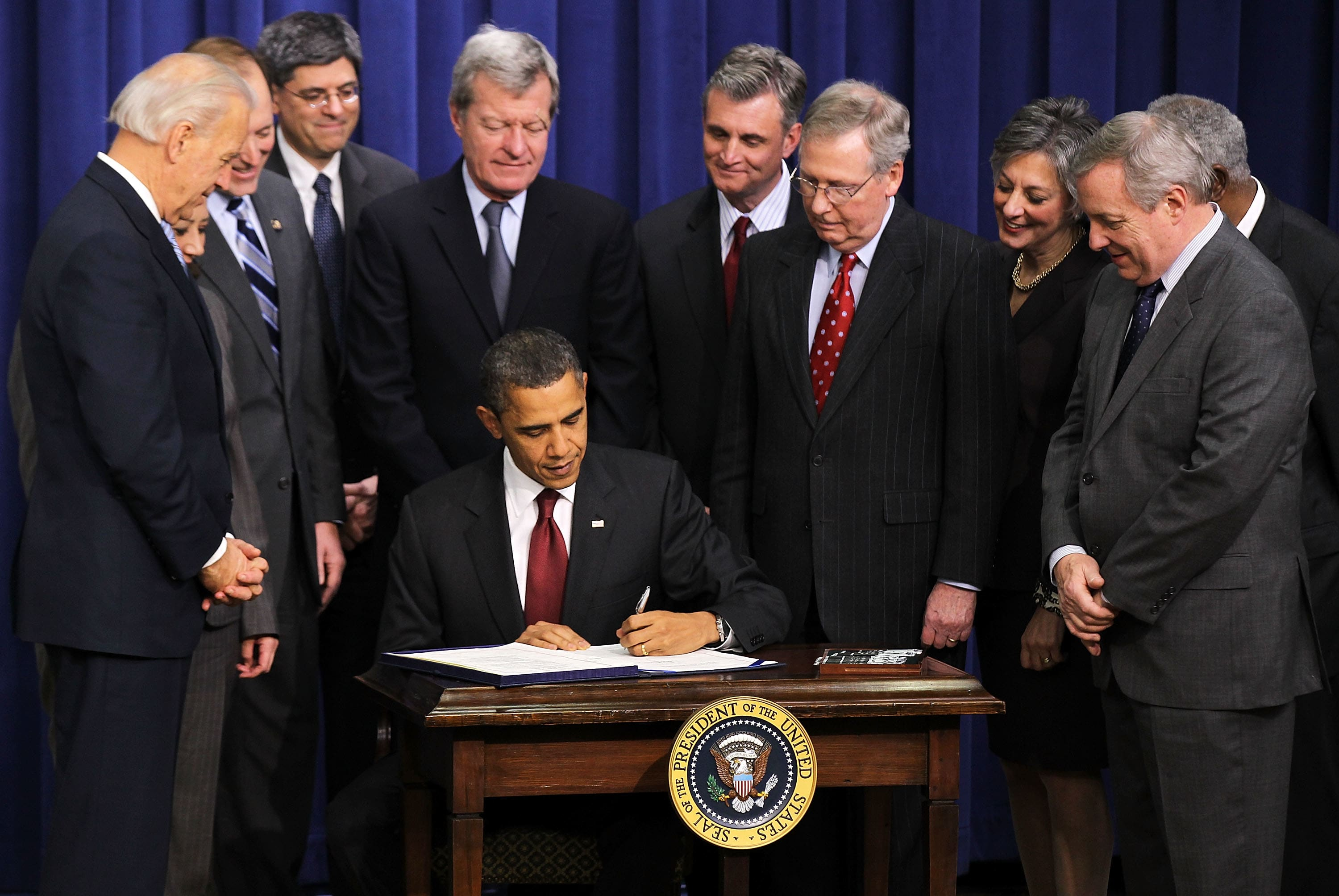
President Obama signs the law into effect, on December 17, 2010, as members of Congress and others look on.

On December 15, the Senate passed the compromise package with an 81–19 vote, with large majorities of both Democrats and Republicans supporting it. Near midnight of December 16, the House passed it 277–148, with it getting only a modest majority among Democrats and a large majority among Republicans (of the 148 votes against the bill in the House, 112 were cast by Democrats and only 36 by Republicans). Before that, an amendment put forward by Democratic Representative Earl Pomeroy and the progressives among the Democratic caucus to raise the estate tax – the ultimate sticking point of the deal for them and the cause of a minor revolt among those against it – had failed on a 194–233 vote. The Washington Post called the approved deal "the most significant tax bill in nearly a decade".

Obama signed the bill into law on December 17, 2010. Much of the Democratic Congressional leadership was absent from the signing ceremony, indicating their ongoing unhappiness with the law. Washington Post writer Dan Balz asserted that Obama's ability to win passage for the law indicated a "resilience of the occupant of the Oval Office" and a possible course he would take during the next Congress.

== Legislative voting breakdown ==
Final Senate vote:

Vote by party	Yea	Nay
Democrats	43	13
Republicans	37	5
Independents	1	1
Total	81	19

Final House vote:

Vote by party	Yea	Nay
Democrats	139	112
Republicans	138	36
Total	277	148

== Implementation ==
The passage of the law so close to the new year caused a scramble for many parties involved.

Employers had to modify payroll systems to the new lower deduction for the FICA payroll tax. The Internal Revenue Service (IRS) allowed employers until January 31, 2011, to do so. While companies that specialize in payroll processing could adapt to the change quickly, smaller companies that do their own payrolls could take longer. It was possible that employees would have to wait for up to three paychecks to see the reduction take place.

The IRS had to reprogram its processing systems for some of the provisions in the law, and said that those who file their tax returns early would need to wait until at least the middle of February if they itemize deductions or take certain other deductions. Any refunds coming to taxpayers would be similarly delayed. Vendors of tax preparation software also had to modify their applications and get the updates to customers; Intuit, the vendor of TurboTax said they were ready and would hold affected returns until the IRS was ready to process them.

== See also ==
- Taxation in the United States
