= Railroad Track Maintenance Tax Credit =

United States federal income tax credit

The Railroad Track Maintenance Tax Credit, also known as the 45G Tax Credit due to its tax line item reference in the Internal Revenue Code of 1986, Title 26, is a federal income tax credit for track maintenance conducted by short lines and regional railroads in the United States. The credit grants an amount equal to 50 percent of qualified track maintenance expenditures and other qualifying railroad infrastructure projects. It was first inserted into the tax code by the American Jobs Creation Act of 2004, and went into effect on January 1, 2005 with an expiration date of December 31, 2009. The credit was extended seven times until it was made permanent by the Consolidated Appropriations Act of 2021, but new legislation was introduced on January 16, 2025 to modify the credit, increasing the per-mile reimbursement cap, making the credit eligible for inflation adjustment and expanding the amount of track eligible for reimbursement.

== Background ==
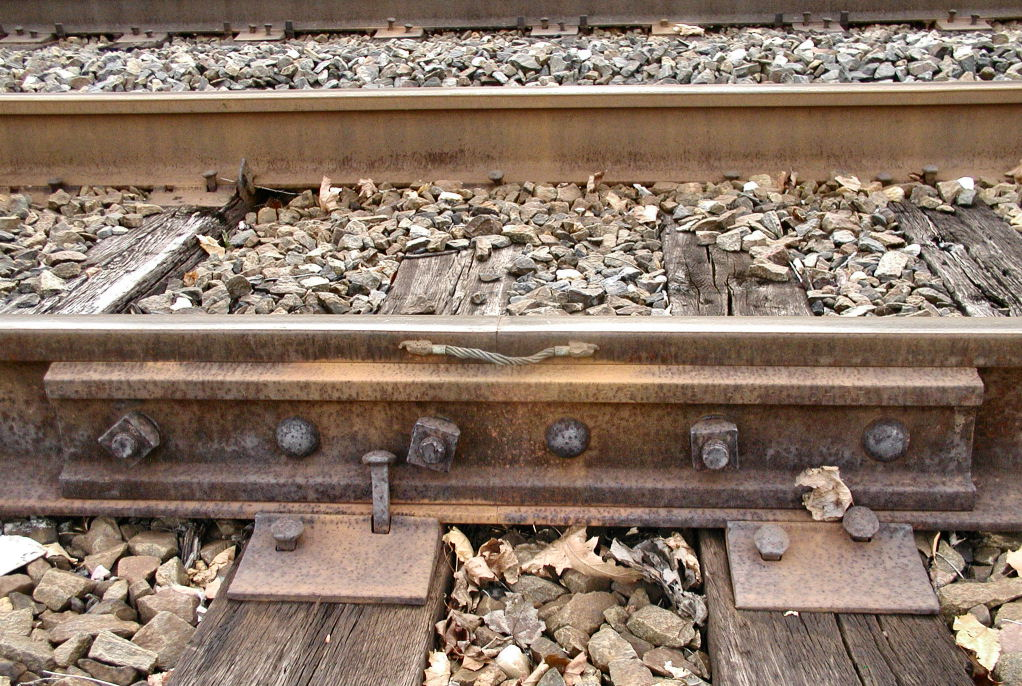
Bonded main line 6-bolt rail joint on a segment of 155 lb/yd (76.9 kg/m) rail.

In the United States, short line and regional railroads grew exponentially following railroad deregulation in 1980. As of 2016 there were an estimated 603 Class II and III railroads serving small and mid-sized towns that otherwise would have lost rail service. Maintenance costs for rail infrastructure are often expensive and difficult for small railroads to cover in part due to the nature of the origins of short line railroads. Many small railroads suffer from decades of deferred maintenance by previous owners, and as a result most of these companies invest a minimum of 25% of their annual revenue in infrastructure improvements.

In order to assist railroads with maintaining their infrastructure, the Railroad Track Maintenance Tax Credit was created. Highway and road infrastructure is maintained by federal and state governments, whereas freight rail infrastructure is maintained by private sector investments. Since its inception, the tax credit has driven over $8 billion in private investment in rail rehabilitation. Data from the Federal Railroad Administration shows that train derailments on short line railroads have declined by 50 percent in the years since the credit was introduced, demonstrating the connection between infrastructure investments and improved safety.

== American Jobs Creation Act of 2004 ==
The tax credit originated with the American Jobs Creation Act of 2004. The credit was capped at $3,500 per mile of track, with eligibility for Class II and Class III railroads, any shippers who transport property using a Class II or Class III railroad, and companies that perform maintenance on or provide material to qualified railroads. With the passing of the act in October 2004, the effective date for the credit was December 31, 2004, with a scheduled expiration date of January 1, 2008, a period of three years.

== Extensions ==
As scheduled, the tax credits originally expired on January 1, 2008. Since then, the provision has been extended six times before it was made permanent as part of the Consolidated Appropriations Act of 2021.

Under the Emergency Economic Stabilization Act of 2008, the tax credit was extended through December 31, 2009. Expiration occurred for the second time as scheduled, however, an extension of the Railroad Maintenance Tax Credit was included in the Tax Relief, Unemployment Insurance Reauthorization, and Job Creation Act of 2010. Under the new legislation, the credit was retroactively applied to the 2010 tax year and extended through January 1, 2012.

The American Taxpayer Relief Act of 2012 (Public Law 112–240, enacted January 2, 2013) made the tax credit effective retroactively from December 31, 2011 to January 1, 2014. The next extension came in the Tax Increase Prevention Act of 2014 (Public Law 113-295, enacted December 19, 2014), effective from 2013 to 2015, followed by an extension in the Protecting Americans from Tax Hikes Act of 2015 (Public Law 114-113, enacted December 18, 2015), effective from 2014 to 2017, and the Bipartisan Budget Act of 2018 (Public Law 115-123, enacted February 9, 2018), effective 2016 to 2018.

Although the tax credit was made permanent, its provisions have not been updated over time. On January 16, 2025 House Ways & Means Committee Tax Subcommittee Chair Mike Kelly (R-Pa.) and Ranking Member Mike Thompson (D-Calif.) introduced the Short Line Railroad Tax Credit Modernization Act, H.R. 516, that would increase the per-mile credit cap and index the credit to inflation.

== IRS Form 8900 ==
Internal Revenue Service Form 8900 is used to claim the tax credit by the taxpayer at a maximum of $3500 per short line track mile per year or 50% of qualified railroad track maintenance paid or incurred during the year whichever is less. Form 8900 is used to assign tax credits between eligible taxpayers who have come to an agreement to transfer tax credits. Eligible taxpayers for this credit are short line railroads, transporters who use the railroad property and any taxpayer who furnishes goods and services to a short line railroad. Shareholders or partners of these eligible taxpayer may receive a passthru of these credits on form K-1.
