= Spark M. Matsunaga Hydrogen Research, Development, and Demonstration Act of 1990 =

- Long title: An Act to establish the Spark M. Matsunaga Hydrogen Research, Development, and Demonstration Program Act of 1990.
- Acronyms (colloquial): HRDDA
- Nicknames: Hydrogen Research, Development, and Demonstration Act of 1990
- Enacted by: the 101st United States Congress
- Effective: November 15, 1990

Citations
- Public law: Pub. L. 101–566
- Statutes at Large: 104 Stat. 2797

Codification
- Titles amended: 42 U.S.C.: Public Health and Social Welfare
- U.S.C. sections created: 42 U.S.C. ch. 128 § 12401 et seq.

Legislative history
- Introduced in the Senate as S. 639 by Spark Matsunaga (D-HI) on March 16, 1989; Committee consideration by Senate Energy and Natural Resources; Passed the Senate on October 16, 1990 (Passed Voice Vote); Passed the House on October 23, 1990 (Passed Voice Vote); Signed into law by President George H. W. Bush on November 15, 1990

Spark M. Matsunaga Hydrogen Research, Development, and Demonstration Act of 1990 is a United States statute establishing a comprehensive five year management program for the domestic distribution, production, and utilization of the lighter than air and diatomic molecule known as hydrogen. The Act of Congress endorsed the development and research of renewable energy and renewable resources for hydrogen production. The United States public law standardized the energy carrier as a critical technology declaring the period 1 element for the expansion of a hydrogen economy within the continental United States.

The United States Senate bill 639 was a supersede to the United States House of Representatives bills H.R. 2793 and H.R. 4521. The Bush Administration bolstered support for the U.S. House bill H.R. 2793 providing initiatives for industry standards as an economic fuel with respect to the hydrogen highway and the hydrogen infrastructure.

== Declaration of the Act ==
The Matsunaga Hydrogen Research and Development Act was authored as nine sections establishing the Title 42 findings, purposes, and definitions for the alternative fuel or hydrogen fuel and energy development resources.

Short Title ~ Title 42 § 101
♦ Act cited as Spark M. Matsunaga Hydrogen Research, Development, and Demonstration Act of 1990
Finding, Purposes, and Definition ~ Title 42 § 102
☆ Finding
♦ It is in the national interest to develop a domestic capability to economically produce hydrogen in quantities that will make a significant contribution toward reducing the Nation's dependence on conventional fuels.
☆ Purposes
♦ Prepare a comprehensive five year comprehensive program management plan that will identify and resolve critical technical issues necessary for the realization of a domestic capability to produce, distribute, and use hydrogen economically.
♦ Develop a technology assessment and information transfer program among the Federal agencies and aerospace, transportation, energy, and other entities.
♦ Develop renewable energy resources as a primary source of energy for the production of hydrogen.
☆ Definition
♦ "Critical technology" or "critical technical issue" means a technology or issue that, requires understanding and development in order to take the next needed step in the development of hydrogen as an economic fuel or hydrogen storage medium.

♦ "Secretary" means the United States Secretary of Energy

Comprehensive Management Plan ~ Title 42 § 103
Research and Development ~ Title 42 § 104
Demonstrations ~ Title 42 § 105
Technology Transfer Program ~ Title 42 § 106
Coordination and Consultation ~ Title 42 § 107
Technical Panel ~ Title 42 § 108
Authorization of Appropriations ~ Title 42 § 109

== Hydrogen Future Act of 1996 ==
The 104th United States Congress drafted U.S. House bill H.R. 655 as introductory legislation for the hydrogen development and research programs. The Clinton Administration supported the renewable energy bill with the exception regarding obligation limitations concerning all energy supply development and research activities.

The 104th United States Congress passed House Bill H.R. 4138 furthering the continuation of the hydrogen demonstration, development, and research programs by the United States Department of Energy. The United States energy policy legislation as congressionally endorsed was presented to the President of the United States on September 30, 1996. United States President Bill Clinton enacted the U.S. House renewable energy law on October 9, 1996.

== See also ==
Energy Policy Act of 1992	Hydrogen safety
Fossil fuel phase-out	Hydrogen station
Green hydrogen	United States energy independence
H_{2} USA	United States hydrogen policy
