= Conduit hydroelectricity =

Conduit hydroelectricity (also known as conduit hydropower, and in-pipe hydropower) is a method of using mechanical energy of water as part of the water delivery system through man-made conduits to generate electricity. Generally, the conduits are existing water pipelines such as in public water supply. Some definitions expand the definition of conduits to be existing tunnels, canals, or aqueducts that are used primarily for other water delivery purposes than electricity generation.

Historically, electricity generation from water pipelines was rare because the water would have been pumped by other engines in the system prior to the intake of water turbines to generate electricity. The energy generated from the turbines would have been offset by the power used in pumping, canceling out the power generation benefit. However, there have been renewed interests to apply this method to recover energy when there is a need to reduce pressure in the water supply system that is normally done through pressure reducing valves. The conduit hydroelectricity generation in this case can be done by replacing the pressure reducing valves with small turbines and electrical generators.

Since 2008, there has been considerable technological development in off-the-shelf "“water-to-wire” turbine technologies including reaction, impulse, and hydrokinetic turbines that target the sub 1-MW in-conduit hydroelectric market."

Portland, Oregon uses conduit generation in its water pipes. The Imperial Irrigation District had plans for 14 new conduit hydropower projects in 2016.

In 2013, the US had "a total of 236 FERC authorized conduit exemption projects."
