= Public Utility Regulatory Policies Act =

Part of the US federal law known as the National Energy Act

- Acronyms (colloquial): PURPA
- Nicknames: Public Utility Regulatory Policies Act of 1978
- Enacted by: the 95th United States Congress
- Effective: November 9, 1978

Citations
- Public law: 95-617
- Statutes at Large: 92 Stat. 3117

Codification
- Titles amended: 16 U.S.C.: Conservation
- U.S.C. sections created: 16 U.S.C. ch. 46 § 2601 et seq.

Legislative history
- Introduced in the House as H.R. 4018 by Thomas B. Evans Jr. (R–DE) on February 24, 1977; Committee consideration by House Ways and Means, Senate Finance; Passed the House on July 18, 1977 (passed voice vote); Passed the Senate on October 6, 1977 (86-7, in lieu of S. 2114 and H.R. 8444); Reported by the joint conference committee on October 6, 1978; agreed to by the Senate on October 9, 1978 (77-14) and by the House on October 14, 1978 (237-174); Signed into law by President Jimmy Carter on November 9, 1978

Major amendments
- Energy Policy Act of 1992; Energy Policy Act of 2005; American Recovery and Reinvestment Act of 2009; Tax Relief, Unemployment Insurance Reauthorization, and Job Creation Act of 2010

The Public Utility Regulatory Policies Act (PURPA, Pub. L. 95–617, 92 Stat. 3117, enacted November 9, 1978) is a United States Act passed as part of the National Energy Act. It was meant to promote energy conservation (reduce demand) and promote greater use of domestic energy and renewable energy (increase supply). The law was created in response to the 1973 energy crisis, and one year in advance of a second energy crisis.

Upon entering the White House, President Jimmy Carter made energy policy a top priority. The law started the energy industry on the road to restructuring.

== Law ==
PURPA was originally passed with the intention of conserving electric energy, increasing efficiency in facilities and resources used by utility companies, making retail rates for electric consumers more fair, speeding up the creation of hydroelectric energy production at small dams, and conserving natural gas.

The main vehicle that the PURPA law used to try and accomplish these goals was by creating a new class of electric generating facilities called “qualifying facilities” (QFs). PURPA gave QFs special rate and regulatory treatment.

The Public Utility Regulatory Policies Act of 1978 (PURPA) encouraged:

- creating a market for power from non-utility power producers
- increased efficiency by making use of cogeneration
- ending promotional rate structures
- encouraging the development of hydroelectric power
- the conservation of electric energy and natural gas

== Non-utility power producers ==
Energy companies were classified as natural monopolies, and for this reason, most were established with vertically integrated structures (that is, they undertook all the functions of generating, transmitting, and distributing electricity to the customer). Utilities became protected as regulated monopolies because it was thought that a company could produce power more efficiently and economically as one company than as several.

PURPA started the industry on the road to restructuring and is one of the first laws that began the deregulation of energy companies. The provision which enabled non-utility generators ("NUGs") to produce power for use by customers attached to a utility's grid broke the previous monopoly in the generation function.

== Ending promotional rate structure ==
Utilities offered customers a "rate structure" that decreased the cost per kWh price of electricity with increasing usage, with subsequent increments costing less per unit. PURPA eliminated promotional rate structures except when they could be justified by the cost structure of utility companies.

== Cogeneration ==
One provision of PURPA is the requirement for increased use of energy cogeneration. The law forced electric utilities to buy power from other more efficient producers, such as cogeneration plants, if that cost was less than the utility's own "avoided cost" rate to the consumer; the avoided cost rate was the additional costs that the electric utility would incur if it generated the required power itself, or if available, could purchase its demand requirements from another source. At the time generally, where demand was growing, this "avoided cost" was considered to be the construction and fossil fuel costs incurred in the operation of another thermal power plant.

As an effect, the number of cogeneration plants, which produce electric power and steam, increased. These plants are encouraged by the law, on the basis that they harness thermal energy (in the form of usable steam) that would be otherwise wasted if electricity alone was produced. PURPA also became the basic legislation that enabled renewable energy providers to gain a toehold in the market, particularly in California, where state authorities were more aggressive in their interpretation of the statute. The portion of the act dealing with cogeneration and small power production appears in US code in Title 16 – Conservation, Chapter 12 – Federal Regulation and Development of Power, Subchapter II – Regulation of Electric Utility Companies Engaged in Interstate Commerce, Sec 824a-3 – Cogeneration and Small Power Production.

This led to the establishment of a new class of generating facilities, which would receive special rate and regulatory treatment. Generating facilities in this group are known as qualifying facilities (QFs), and fall into two categories: qualifying small power production facilities and qualifying cogeneration facilities.

A small power production facility is an electric generation facility that produces 80 MW or less and that uses renewable sources (such as hydro, wind or solar) as its primary energy source. A cogeneration facility is an electric generation facility that creates electricity in a very efficient way, meaning that the facility produces both electricity and “another form of useful thermal energy (such as heat or steam) in a way that is more efficient than the separate production of both forms of energy.”

== Renewable energy ==
PURPA provided favorable terms to companies that produced electricity from renewable (non-fossil-fuel) resources. California increased wind on the grid from 10 MW in 1981 to 1700 MW in the early 1990s.

== Implementation ==
Although a Federal law, PURPA's implementation was left to the individual states, because needs varied; a variety of regulatory regimes developed in states where renewable power resources were needed, available for development, or the generated power could be transmitted. Little was done in many states where such resources were unavailable, where the demand growth was slower or previously accommodated in planning.

== Legacy ==
PURPA is becoming less important, as many of the contracts made under it during the 1980s are expiring. Another reason for PURPA's reduced significance is that electric deregulation and open access to electricity transportation by utilities has created a vast market for the purchase of energy and State regulatory agencies have therefore stopped forcing utilities to give contracts to developers of non-utility power projects. However, it is still an important piece of legislation promoting renewable energy because it exempts the developers of such projects from numerous State and Federal regulatory regimes.

This free market approach presented investment opportunity and government encouragement for more development of environment-friendly, renewable energy projects and technologies; the law created a market in which non-utility Independent Power Producers developed, and some energy market players failed.

Critics of PURPA cited that power producers signed multi-year cost of electricity contracts at a time when energy prices were high. When oil prices went down, utilities had to honor the rates of those contracts, leading to high power prices.

PURPA was the only existing federal law that requires competition in the utility industry and the only law that encourages renewables, if it is cost competitive with conventional polluting resources, until the 2009 amendments to the Defense Production Act and the Inflation Reduction Act of 2022.

== Amendment proposals and new legislation ==
In February 2005, Senator Jim Jeffords from Vermont introduced an amendment to PURPA calling for a Renewable portfolio standard.

PURPA was amended in 2005 by the Energy Policy Act of 2005 in sections 1251 through 1254. There is pending legislation in the US Senate that would amend PURPA to require FERC to develop standards for interconnection of distributed generation facilities, and that would require "electric utilities" meeting the PURPA size requirement (retail sales of more than 500 million kw hrs) to implement those standards.

One proposed law that would amend PURPA is the Hydropower Regulatory Efficiency Act of 2013 (H.R. 267). The bill was introduced into the United States House of Representatives of the 113th United States Congress on January 15, 2013, and it passed the House on February 13, 2013 by a vote of 422-0. If enacted, the bill would change some of the regulations in the United States surrounding hydropower by making it easier for smaller hydropower stations to be created. According to the bill's proponents, current regulations are unwieldy and represent a significant hurdle to creating more hydropower plants. H.R. 267 would alter those regulations to make it easier for smaller plants to get approval quickly. Section 3 of H.R. 267 amends the Public Utility Regulatory Policies Act of 1978 (PURPA) to increase from 5,000 to 10,000 kilowatts the size of small hydroelectric power projects which the Federal Energy Regulatory Commission (FERC) may exempt from its license requirements.

See related energy policy contained in 42 USC Chapter 134 – Energy Policy.

In October 2018, the National Association of Regulatory Utility Commissioners (NARUC) made suggestions in a report that FERC should modernize PURPA for the energy sector. NARUC's paper "proposes that FERC exempt from PURPA’s mandatory purchase obligation those utilities which are subject to state competitive solicitation requirements and other best practices that ensure all technologies access to the market."

=== 2019 FERC notice of proposed rulemaking ===
In September 2019, the Federal Energy Regulatory Commission (FERC) announced its intention to update certain provisions of the PURPA law, in a process known as a “notice of proposed rulemaking” (NOPR). One of the original intentions of PURPA was to try to break the U.S.'s dependence on fossil fuels during the 1970s energy crisis. To accomplish that, PURPA encouraged creation of small power production facilities called “qualifying facilities” (QFs). QFs produce power from sources other than fossil fuels, or they make power using a combination of fossil fuels with renewable energy sources.

In the NOPR, FERC asserted that today the country has a high supply of “relatively inexpensive” natural gas due to technological advances and the discovery of new gas reserves. Therefore, FERC wrote, there is no longer the same need now as there was in 1978 to address natural gas shortages. When PURPA was originally passed in the late 1970s, many utility companies were “vertically integrated” and did not want to buy power from third-party independent generators. However, today the system and market is much different: the market has open-access transmission and there is a wholesale market that allows utilities to buy power from independent generators at competitive market prices. Today, most energy production based on renewable resources does not require reliance on PURPA.

In September 2019, during a FERC hearing, its Chairman Neil Chatterjee voiced his support for making changes to PURPA in light of “tremendous technological advances in renewables” since passage of PURPA in 1978. One idea for updating PURPA is to give more flexibility to individual states to use more competitive prices when setting QF rates.

Investor-owned utility companies, represented by their national association the Edison Electric Institute (EEI), supported FERC’s proposed updates to PURPA. According to the head of the Edison Electric Institute, PURPA requires utilities to buy energy from QFs at prices that are often higher than market prices, resulting in “billions of dollars in additional consumer costs". EEI also stated it more bluntly: PURPA requires its member utilities to buy power it often doesn’t even need at mandatory above-market prices.

The National Rural Electric Cooperative Association and the American Public Power Association also supported FERC's proposed changes.

A group of opponents, which included eight attorneys general, the FTC, and electric power supply companies, wrote FERC to express their opposition. They laid out their concerns that FERC would be overstepping its authority in making these changes, something legal and renewables groups had argued as well. The states also raised concerns that the rules could harm renewables deployment in their states and others according to the electric industry news site UTILITY DIVE.

== See also ==
- Public Utility Holding Company Act of 1935
- Energy Policy Act of 2005
- Energy Policy Act of 1992
