= National Hydropower Association =

The National Hydropower Association (NHA) represents the interests of the U.S. hydropower industry, which includes all forms of water energy—conventional, hydrokinetic, tidal and ocean.

Since 1983, NHA has represented the majority of domestic, non-federal hydroelectric producers. The association has around 350 members which include public utilities, investor-owned utilities, independent power producers, equipment manufacturers, environmental and engineering consultants, and hydropower attorneys from all regions of the country. Its mission is to protect and promote the nation's largest renewable resource through its legislative, regulatory, technical and public communications activities.

The current president and CEO is Malcolm Woolf. Woolf previously worked for Maryland Governor Martin O'Malley and worked on energy policy for the National Governor's Association.

== See also ==
- Hydroelectricity
- Solar Energy Industries Association
- American Wind Energy Association
- List of renewable energy organizations
