= Energy Policy Act of 2005 =

United States Law

- Other short titles: Coal Leasing Amendments Act of 2005; Electricity Modernization Act of 2005; Energy Policy Tax Incentives Act of 2005; Energy Research, Development, Demonstration, and Commercial Application Act of 2005; Energy Tax Incentives Act of 2005; Federal Reformulated Fuels Act of 2005; Indian Tribal Energy Development and Self-Determination Act of 2005; EPAct 2005; John Rishel Geothermal Steam Act Amendments of 2005; National Geological and Geophysical Data Preservation Program Act of 2005; No Oil Producing and Exporting Cartels Act of 2005; NOPEC; Oil Shale, Tar Sands, and Other Strategic Unconventional Fuels Act of 2005; Price-Anderson Amendments Act of 2005; Public Utility Holding Company Act of 2005; SAFE Act; Set America Free Act of 2005; Spark M. Matsunaga Hydrogen Act of 2005; Underground Storage Tank Compliance Act
- Long title: An Act to ensure jobs for our future with secure, affordable, and reliable energy.
- Enacted by: the 109th United States Congress
- Effective: August 8, 2005

Citations
- Public law: 109-58
- Statutes at Large: 119 Stat. 594

Codification
- Acts amended: Energy Policy Act of 1992; Public Utility Regulatory Policies Act (PURPA) of 1978
- Acts repealed: Public Utility Holding Company Act of 1935
- Titles amended: 16 U.S.C.: Conservation; 42 U.S.C.: Public Health and Social Welfare
- U.S.C. sections created: 42 U.S.C. ch. 149 § 15801 et seq.
- U.S.C. sections amended: 16 U.S.C. ch. 46 § 2601 et seq. 42 U.S.C. ch. 134 § 13201 et seq.

Legislative history
- Introduced in the House as H.R. 6 by Joe Barton (R–TX) on April 18, 2005; Committee consideration by House Energy and Commerce, House Education and the Workforce, House Financial Services, House Agriculture, House Resources, House Science, House Ways and Means, House Transportation and Infrastructure; Passed the House on April 21, 2005 (249-183, Roll call vote 132, via Clerk.House.gov); Passed the Senate on June 28, 2005 (85-12, Roll call vote 158, via Senate.gov); Reported by the joint conference committee on July 27, 2005; agreed to by the House on July 28, 2005 (275-156, Roll call vote 445, via Clerk.House.gov) and by the Senate on July 29, 2005 (74-26, Roll call vote 213, via Senate.gov); Signed into law by President George W. Bush on August 8, 2005

Major amendments
- American Recovery and Reinvestment Act of 2009; Tax Relief, Unemployment Insurance Reauthorization, and Job Creation Act of 2010

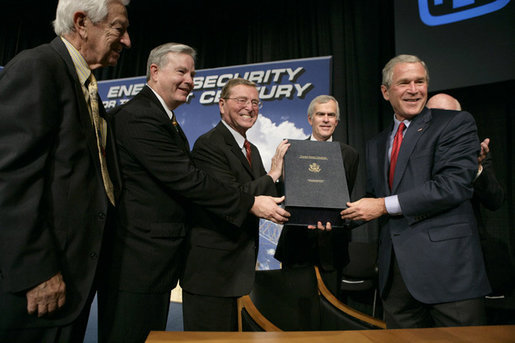
George W. Bush signing the Energy Policy Act of 2005, which was designed to promote US nuclear reactor construction, through incentives and subsidies, including cost-overrun support up to a total of $2 billion for six new nuclear plants.

The Energy Policy Act of 2005 (Pub. L. 109–58 (text) (PDF)) is a federal law signed by President George W. Bush on August 8, 2005, at Sandia National Laboratories in Albuquerque, New Mexico. The act, described by proponents as an attempt to combat growing energy problems, changed US energy policy by providing tax incentives and loan guarantees for energy production of various types. The most consequential aspect of the law was to greatly increase ethanol production to be blended with gasoline. The law also repealed the Public Utility Holding Company Act of 1935, effective February 2006.

== Provisions ==
=== General provisions ===
- The act increases the amount of biofuel (usually ethanol) that must be mixed with gasoline sold in the United States to 4 billion US gallons (15,000,000 m^{3}) by 2006, 6.1 billion US gallons (23,000,000 m^{3}) by 2009 and 7.5 billion US gallons (28,000,000 m^{3}) by 2012; two years later, the Energy Independence and Security Act of 2007 extended the target to 36 billion US gallons (140,000,000 m^{3}) by 2022.
- Under an amendment in the American Recovery and Reinvestment Act of 2009, Section 406, the Energy Policy Act of 2005 authorizes loan guarantees for innovative technologies that avoid greenhouse gases, which might include advanced nuclear reactor designs, such as pebble bed modular reactors (PBMRs) as well as carbon capture and storage and renewable energy;
- It seeks to increase coal as an energy source while also reducing air pollution, through authorizing $200 million annually for clean coal initiatives, repealing the current 160-acre (0.65 km^{2}) cap on coal leases, allowing the advanced payment of royalties from coal mines and requiring an assessment of coal resources on federal lands that are not national parks;
- It authorizes tax credits for wind and other alternative energy producers;
- It adds ocean energy sources, including wave and tidal power for the first time as separately identified, renewable technologies;
- It authorizes $50 million annually over the life of the law for biomass grants;
- It includes provisions aimed at making geothermal energy more competitive with fossil fuels in generating electricity;
- It requires the Department of Energy to:
  - Study and report on existing natural energy resources including wind, solar, waves and tides;
  - Study and report on national benefits of demand response and make a recommendation on achieving specific levels of benefits and encourages time-based pricing and other forms of demand response as a policy decision;
  - Designate National Interest Electric Transmission Corridors where there are significant transmission limitations adversely affecting the public (the Federal Energy Regulatory Commission may authorize federal permits for transmission projects in these regions);
  - Report in one year on how to dispose of high-level nuclear waste;
- It authorizes the Department of the Interior to grant leases for activity that involves the production, transportation or transmission of energy on the Outer Continental Shelf lands from sources other than gas and oil (Section 388);
- It requires all public electric utilities to offer net metering on request to their customers;
- It prohibits the manufacture and importation of mercury-vapor lamp ballasts after January 1, 2008;
- It provides tax breaks for those making energy conservation improvements to their homes;
- It provides incentives to companies to drill for oil in the Gulf of Mexico;
- It exempts oil and gas producers from certain requirements of the Safe Drinking Water Act;
- It extends the daylight saving time by four to five weeks, depending upon the year (see below);
- It requires that no drilling for gas or oil may be done in or underneath the Great Lakes;
- It requires that the Federal Fleet vehicles capable of operating on alternative fuels be operated on these fuels exclusively (Section 701);
- It sets federal reliability standards regulating the electrical grid (done in response to the 2003 North America blackout);
- It includes nuclear-specific provisions;
  - It extends the Price-Anderson Nuclear Industries Indemnity Act through 2025;
  - It authorizes cost-overrun support of up to $2 billion total for up to six new nuclear power plants;
  - It authorizes production tax credit of up to $125 million total a year, estimated at 1.8 US¢/kWh during the first eight years of operation for the first 6.000 MW of capacity, consistent with renewables;
  - It authorizes loan guarantees of up to 80% of project cost to be repaid within 30 years or 90% of the project's life;
  - It authorizes $2.95 billion for R&D and the building of an advanced hydrogen cogeneration reactor at Idaho National Laboratory;
  - It authorizes 'standby support' for new reactor delays that offset the financial impact of delays beyond the industry's control for the first six reactors, including 100% coverage of the first two plants with up to $500 million each and 50% of the cost of delays for plants three through six with up to $350 million each for;
  - It allows nuclear plant employees and certain contractors to carry firearms;
  - It prohibits the sale, export or transfer of nuclear materials and "sensitive nuclear technology" to any state sponsor of terrorist activities;
  - It updates tax treatment of decommissioning funds;
- The law exempted fluids used in the natural gas extraction process of hydraulic fracturing (fracking) from protections under the Clean Air Act, Clean Water Act, Safe Drinking Water Act, and CERCLA ("Superfund").
- It directs the Secretary of the Interior to complete a programmatic environmental impact statement for a commercial leasing program for oil shale and tar sands resources on public lands with an emphasis on the most geologically prospective lands within each of the states of Colorado, Utah, and Wyoming.

=== Tax reductions by subject area ===
- $4.3 billion for nuclear power
- $2.8 billion for fossil fuel production
- $2.7 billion to extend the renewable electricity production credit
- $1.6 billion in tax incentives for investments in "clean coal" facilities
- $1.3 billion for energy conservation and efficiency
- $1.3 billion for alternative fuel vehicles and fuels (bioethanol, biomethane, liquified natural gas, propane)
- $500 million Clean Renewable Energy Bonds (CREBS) for government agencies for renewable energy projects.

=== Change to daylight saving time ===
The law amended the Uniform Time Act of 1966 by changing the start and end dates of daylight saving time, beginning in 2007. Clocks were set ahead one hour on the second Sunday of March (March 11, 2007) instead of on the first Sunday of April (April 1, 2007). Clocks were set back one hour on the first Sunday of November (November 4, 2007), rather than on the last Sunday of October (October 28, 2007). This had the net effect of slightly lengthening the duration of daylight saving time.

Lobbyists for this provision included the Sporting Goods Manufacturers Association, the National Association of Convenience Stores, and the National Retinitis Pigmentosa Foundation Fighting Blindness.

Lobbyists against this provision included the U.S. Conference of Catholic Bishops, the United Synagogue of Conservative Judaism, the National Parent-Teacher Association, the Calendaring and Scheduling Consortium, the Edison Electric Institute, and the Air Transport Association. This section of the act is controversial; some have questioned whether daylight saving results in net energy savings.

=== Commercial building deduction ===
The act created the Energy Efficient Commercial Buildings Tax Deduction, a special financial incentive designed to reduce the initial cost of investing in energy-efficient building systems via an accelerated tax deduction under section §179D of the Internal Revenue Code (IRC) Many building owners are unaware that the [Policy Act of 2005] includes a tax deduction (§179D) for investments in "energy efficient commercial building property" designed to significantly reduce the heating, cooling, water heating and interior lighting cost of new or existing commercial buildings placed into service between January 1, 2006, and December 31, 2013. §179D includes full and partial tax deductions for investments in energy efficient commercial building that are designed to increase the efficiency of energy-consuming functions. Up to $.60 for lighting$, .60 for HVAC and $.60 for building envelope, creating a potential deduction of $1.80 per sq/ft. Interior lighting may also be improved using the Interim Lighting Rule, which provides a simplified process to earn the Deduction, capped at $0.30-$0.60/square foot. Improvements are compared to a baseline of ASHRAE 2001 standards.

To obtain these benefits the facilities/energy division of a business, its tax department, and a firm specializing in EPAct 179D deductions needed to cooperate. IRS mandated software had to be used and an independent 3rd party had to certify the qualification. For municipal buildings, benefits were passed through to the primary designers/architects in an attempt to encourage innovative municipal design.

The Commercial Buildings Tax Deduction expiration date had been extended twice, last by the Energy Improvement and Extension Act of 2008. With this extension, the CBTD could be claimed for qualifying projects completed before January 1, 2014.

=== Energy management ===
The commercial building tax deductions could be used to improve the payback period of a prospective energy improvement investment. The deductions could be combined by participating in demand response programs where building owners agree to curtail usage at peak times for a premium. The most common qualifying projects were in the area of lighting.

=== Energy savings ===
Summary of Energy Savings Percentages Provided by IRS Guidance

Percentages permitted under Notice 2006–52 (Effective for property placed in service January 1, 2006 – December 31, 2008)

- Interior Lighting Systems 16 2/3%,
- Heating, Cooling, Ventilation, and Hot Water Systems 16 2/3%,
- Building Envelope 16 2/3%.

Percentages permitted under Notice 2008–40 (Effective for property placed in service January 1, 2006 – December 31, 2013)

- Interior Lighting Systems 20%,
- Heating, Cooling, Ventilation, and Hot Water Systems 20%,
- Building Envelope 10%.

Percentages permitted under Notice 2012–22

- Interior Lighting Systems 25%,
- Heating, Cooling, Ventilation, and Hot Water Systems 15%,
- Building Envelope 10%.

Effective date of Notice 2012-22 – December 31, 2013; if §179D is extended beyond December 31, 2013, is also effective (except as otherwise provided in an amendment of §179D or the guidance thereunder) during the period of the extension.

== Cost estimate ==
The Congressional Budget Office (CBO) review of the conference version of the bill estimated the act would increase direct spending by $2.2 billion over the 2006–2010 period, and by $1.6 billion over the 2006–2015 period. The CBO did not attempt to estimate additional effects on discretionary spending. The CBO and the Joint Committee on Taxation estimated that the legislation would reduce revenues by $7.9 billion over the 2005–2010 period and by $12.3 billion over the 2005–2015 period.

== Support ==
The collective reduction in national consumption of energy (gas and electricity) is significant for home heating. The act provided tangible financial incentives (tax credits) for average homeowners to make environmentally positive changes to their homes. It made improvements to home energy use more affordable for walls, doors, windows, roofs, water heaters, etc. Consumer spending, and hence the national economy, was abetted. Industry grew for manufacture of these environmentally positive improvements. These positive improvements have been near and long-term in effect.

The collective reduction in national consumption of oil is significant for automotive vehicles. The act provided tangible financial incentives (tax credits) for operators of hybrid vehicles. It helped fuel competition among auto makers to meet rising demands for fuel-efficient vehicles. Consumer spending, and hence the national economy, was abetted. Dependence on imported oil was reduced. The national trade deficit was improved. Industry grew for manufacture of these environmentally positive improvements. These positive improvements have been near and long-term in effect.

== Criticism ==
- The Washington Post contended that the spending bill was a broad collection of subsidies for United States energy companies; in particular, the nuclear and oil industries.
- Speaking for the National Republicans for Environmental Protection Association, President Martha Marks said that the organization was disappointed in the law because it did not support conservation enough, and continued to subsidize the well-established oil and gas industries that didn't require subsidizing.
- The law did not include provisions for drilling in the Arctic National Wildlife Refuge (ANWR); some Republicans claimed "access to the abundant oil reserves in ANWR would strengthen America's energy independence without harming the environment."
- Senator Hillary Clinton criticized Senator Barack Obama's vote for the bill in the 2008 Democratic Primary.

== Legislative history ==
The act was voted on and passed twice by the United States Senate, once prior to conference committee, and once after. In both cases, there were numerous senators who voted against the bill. John McCain, the Republican Party nominee for President of the United States in the 2008 election voted against the bill. Democrat Barack Obama, President of the United States from January 2009 to January 2017, voted in favor of the bill.

=== Provisions in the original bill that were not in the act ===
- Limited liability for producers of MTBE.
- Drilling for oil in the Arctic National Wildlife Refuge (ANWR).
- Increasing vehicle efficiency standards (CAFE).
- Requiring increased reliance on non-greenhouse gas-emitting energy sources similar to the Kyoto Protocol.

To remove from 18 CFR Part 366.1 the definitions of "electric utility company" and exempt wholesale generator (EWG), that an EWG is not an electric utility company.

=== Preliminary Senate vote ===
June 28, 2005, 10:00 a.m. Yeas - 85, Nays - 12

=== Conference committee ===
The bill's conference committee included 14 Senators and 51 House members. The senators on the committee were: Republicans Domenici, Craig, Thomas, Alexander, Murkowski, Burr, Grassley and Democrats Bingaman, Akaka, Dorgan, Wyden, Johnson, and Baucus.

=== Final Senate vote ===
July 29, 2005, 12:50 p.m. Yeas - 74, Nays - 26

=== Legislative history ===
Stage	House of Representatives	Senate
Initial Debate
Introduction	April 18, 2005	June 11
Committed	April 18	June 14
Committee Name(s)	Energy and Commerce; Education and the Workforce; Financial Services; Agriculture; Resources; Science; Ways and Means; Transportation and Infrastructure	
Committee Stage	April 18 to 19	
Committee Report	April 19	
Floor Debate	April 19 to 21	June 14 to 23 Cloture invoked June 23,
Passage	April 21,	June 28,
Conference Stage
Conference Demanded/Accepted	July 13	July 1
Conference Meetings	July 14 to 24	
Report Filed	July 27	
Final Passage
Final Debate	July 28	July 28 to 29; Budget Act waived, July 29,
Concurrence and Passage	July 28,	July 29,
Presented to President	August 4	
Signed	August 8	

== See also ==
- Energy Policy Act of 1992
- Public Utility Regulatory Policies Act (PURPA) of 1978
- Demand response
- Energy crisis
- FutureGen, zero-emissions coal-fired power plant
- Hydrogen economy
- Internal Revenue Service
- Loan guarantee
- Nuclear Power 2010 Program
- Oil depletion
- Oil industry
- Power plant
- Price-Anderson Nuclear Industries Indemnity Act
- Public Utility Holding Company Act of 1935
- Renewable energy in the United States
- Synthetic Liquid Fuels Act
- Energy policy of the United States
- United States energy law
