= Energy Policy Act of 1992 =

United States law

- Other short titles: Energy bill; Energy Security/Oil Independence bill; National Energy efficiency Act of 1991
- Long title: An Act to provide for improved energy efficiency.
- Nicknames: Coal Industry Retiree Health Benefit Act of 1992
- Enacted by: the 102nd United States Congress
- Effective: October 24, 1992

Citations
- Public law: 102-486
- Statutes at Large: 106 Stat. 2776

Codification
- Acts amended: Public Utility Regulatory Policies Act of 1978; Public Utility Holding Company Act of 1935
- Titles amended: 16 U.S.C.: Conservation; 42 U.S.C.: Public Health and Social Welfare
- U.S.C. sections created: 16 U.S.C. ch. 46 § 2601 et seq. 42 U.S.C. ch. 134 § 13201 et seq.

Legislative history
- Introduced in the House as H.R. 776 by Philip R. Sharp (D-IN) on February 4, 1991; Committee consideration by House Energy and Commerce, House Foreign Affairs, House Government Operations, House Judiciary, House Interior and Insular Affairs, House Merchant Marine and Fisheries, House Public Works and Transportation, House Science, Space and Technology, House Ways and Means, House Agriculture, Senate Finance; Passed the House on May 27, 1992 (381-37 Roll call vote 144, via Clerk.House.gov); Passed the Senate on July 30, 1992 (93-3 Roll call vote 163, via Senate.gov); Reported by the joint conference committee on October 5, 1992; agreed to by the House on October 5, 1992 (363-60 Roll call vote 474, via Clerk.House.gov) and by the Senate on October 8, 1992 (passed voice vote); Signed into law by President George H. W. Bush on October 24, 1992

Major amendments
- Energy Policy Act of 2005; American Recovery and Reinvestment Act of 2009; Tax Relief, Unemployment Insurance Reauthorization, and Job Creation Act of 2010

The Energy Policy Act of 1992, effective October 24, 1992, (102nd Congress H.R.776.ENR, abbreviated as EPACT92) is a United States government act. It was passed by Congress and set goals, created mandates, and amended utility laws to increase clean energy use and improve overall energy efficiency in the United States. The Act consists of twenty-seven titles detailing various measures designed to lessen the nation's dependence on imported energy, provide incentives for clean and renewable energy, and promote energy conservation in buildings.

== Amendment of prior energy acts ==
It reformed the Public Utility Holding Company Act of 1935 (PUHCA) to help small utility companies stay competitive with larger utilities and amended the Public Utility Regulatory Policies Act (PURPA) of 1978, broadening the range of resource choices for utility companies and outlined new rate-making standards. It also amended parts of the Federal Power Act of 1935 (Title VII).

== Titles ==
The act addressed:

- Energy efficiency, energy conservation and energy management (Title I),
- Natural gas imports and exports (Title II),
- Alternative fuels and requiring certain fleets to acquire alternative fuel vehicles, which are capable of operating on nonpetroleum fuels (Title III-V),
- Electric motor vehicles (Title VI),
- Radioactive waste (Title VIII),
- Coal power and clean coal (Title XIII),
- Renewable energy (Title XII), and
- Other issues.

=== Title I: Energy efficiency ===
Title I established a comprehensive energy efficiency program that included incentives for energy conservation in buildings and created efficiency standards for appliances.

The EPAct directed the federal government to decrease energy consumption in federal buildings when feasible, and to integrate the use of alternative fuel vehicles in federal and state fleets. There are separate sections dedicated to coal, oil, natural gas, and nuclear energy detailing clean energy incentives, research & development strategies, conservation goals, and responsible management practices.

==== Energy efficiency provisions ====
- Buildings - Requires states to establish minimum commercial building energy codes and to consider minimum residential codes based on current voluntary codes. This gave impetus to the creation and modification of ASHRAE 90.1/1999, 2001, ASHRAE 90.2, the Model Energy Code etc.
- Utilities - Requires states to consider new regulatory standards that would require utilities to undertake integrated resource planning; allow the energy efficiency programs to be at least as profitable as new supply options; and encourage improvements in supply system efficiency.
- Equipment Standards - Establishes efficiency standards for: Commercial heating and air-conditioning equipment; electric motors; and lamps.
- Renewable Energy - Establishes a program for providing federal support on a competitive basis for renewable energy technologies
- Alternative Fuels
- Electric Vehicles
- Electricity - Removes obstacles to wholesale power competition in the Public Utilities Holding Company Act (PUHCA).

=== Title III: Alternative fuels ===
Title III of the 1992 Energy Policy Act addresses alternative fuels. It gave the United States Department of Energy administrative power to regulate the minimum number of light duty alternative fuel vehicles required in certain federal fleets beginning in fiscal year 1993. Title III includes:

- Federal Fleet Requirements.
- State and Alternative Fuel Provider Rule.
- Private and Local Government Fleet Rule.
- Alternative Fuel Designation Authority.

=== Title VI: Electric motor vehicles ===
The United States Department of Energy, which has EPACT92 implementation authority, ruled that diesel-electric or gasoline-electric hybrids are not "alternative fuel vehicles."

=== Title VIII: Radioactive waste ===
Section 801 directed the United States Environmental Protection Agency to promulgate radiation protection standards for the Yucca Mountain nuclear waste repository, which had been designated by the Federal government to serve as the permanent disposal site for used nuclear fuel and other radioactive materials from commercial nuclear power plants and U.S. Department of Defense activities.

=== Title XII: Renewable energy ===
Title XXII in the EPAct authorized tax incentives and marketing strategies for renewable energy technologies in an effort to encourage commercial sales and production.

=== Title XX: Reduction of oil vulnerability ===
Section 2026 known as Renewable Hydrogen Energy establishes a five-year program in accordance with the Spark M. Matsunaga Hydrogen Research, Development, and Demonstration Act of 1990 for the distribution, production, storage, and utilization of hydrogen.

== Impact ==
EPACT92 was far reaching in the impacting electric power deregulation, building codes and new energy efficient products. The act was also responsible for the mandate of low flush toilets and outlawing the installation of toilets that flushed more than 1.6 U.S. gallons (6.1 liters) of water.

== See also ==
- United States Enrichment Corporation
- Public Utility Holding Company Act of 1935
- Public Utility Regulatory Policies Act of 1978
