= List of United States energy acts =

This is a list of statutes enacted by the United States Congress pertaining to the energy industry.

| Year | Title | Summary |
|---|---|---|
| 1920 | Federal Water Power Act | Created Federal Power Commission to coordinate federal hydroelectric projects. |
| 1935 | Federal Power Act | Put electricity sale and transportation regulation under Federal Power Commission. |
| 1935 | Public Utility Holding Company Act | Regulated size of electric utilities, limiting each to a specific geographic area. (repealed in 2005) |
| 1936 | Rural Electrification Act | Funded electric cooperatives to bring electricity to underserved rural areas. |
| 1938 | Natural Gas Act | Gas pipelines regulated under Federal Power Commission. |
| 1946 | Atomic Energy Act | Put development of nuclear weapons and power under civilian control (instead of military). |
| 1954 | Atomic Energy Act | Opened way for civilian nuclear power program. |
| 1974 | Solar Energy Research, Development and Demonstration Act of 1974 | Created the Solar Energy Coordination and Management Project.; Created the Solar Energy Research Institute (the predecessor to NREL). |
| 1975 | Energy Policy and Conservation Act | Created Strategic Petroleum Reserve.; Established first automobile fuel economy standards.; Banned crude oil exports (repealed in 2015). |
| 1977 | Department of Energy Organization Act | Created Federal Department of Energy (DOE). |
| 1978 | National Energy Act, incorporating: National Energy Conservation Policy Act; Power Plant and Industrial Fuel Use Act; Public Utility Regulatory Policies Act; Energy Tax Act; Natural Gas Policy Act | Encouraged conservation efforts in homes, schools, and other public buildings.; Restricted new power plants using oil or natural gas (repealed in 1987).; Opened electric markets to alternative power producers.; Taxed "gas guzzlers", gave income tax credits for alternative fuel use.; Phased deregulation of gas wellhead prices. |
| 1978 | Solar Photovoltaic Energy Research, Development, and Demonstration Act of 1978 | Accelerated solar power generation technologies. |
| 1980 | Energy Security Act, incorporating: U.S. Synthetic Fuels Corporation Act; Biomass Energy and Alcohol Fuels Act; Renewable Energy Resources Act; Solar Energy and Energy Conservation Act; Geothermal Energy Act; Ocean Thermal Energy Conversion Act | Created Synthetic Fuels Corporation to market fossil fuel alternatives.; Provided loan guarantees for biofuels and alcohol fuels projects.; Revised the Defense Production Act of 1950 to allow federal improvements to energy supply.; Created financing regulations for solar, geothermal, and ocean thermal energy conversion (OTEC) energy. |
| 1982 | Nuclear Waste Policy Act | First comprehensive nuclear waste legislation. |
| 1989 | Natural Gas Wellhead Decontrol Act of 1989 | Amends the Natural Gas Policy Act of 1978 to declare that the price guidelines for the first sale of natural gas. |
| 1992 | Energy Policy Act | Required alternative fuel vehicle use in some private/government fleets.; Mandated energy efficiency standards for buildings, lights, and appliances.; Created a cost-sharing program for turbine efficiency research.; Exempted a new category of power generator, the "wholesale generator", from federal regulation. |
| 2005 | Energy Policy Act | Provided tax incentives for conservation and use of alternative fuels.; Repealed the Public Utility Holding Company Act of 1935, allowing more corporate concentration for utilities.; Gave FERC "backstop siting authority" for interstate transmission lines in case a state deferred approval. |
| 2007 | Energy Independence and Security Act, incorporating: America COMPETES Act | Increased fuel economy requirements.; Phased out incandescent light bulbs.; Encouraged biofuel development.; Created ARPA-E. |
| 2008 | Public Law 110-343, incorporating: Food, Conservation, and Energy Act of 2008; Strategic Petroleum Reserve Fill Suspension and Consumer Protection Act; Energy Improvement and Extension Act of 2008 | Promoted biofuels.; Created tax incentives for electric vehicles.; Extended and modified renewable energy tax incentives and defined electricity as a clean fuel. |
| 2009 | American Recovery and Reinvestment Act of 2009 | Provided funding for an electric smart grid.; Created and modified renewable energy tax cuts.; Weatherized modest-income homes.; Incentivized federal building energy efficiency.; Funded development of carbon capture and storage, electric vehicle battery manufacturing, and biofuel and fossil fuel research.; Reduced the nation's nuclear footprint by nearly 70 percent. |
| 2009 | Defense Production Act Reauthorization | Modified the Defense Production Act to promote renewables and the smart grid. |
| 2015 | Consolidated Appropriations Act, 2016 | Extended renewable energy tax cuts.; Lifted crude oil export ban. |
| 2020 | Consolidated Appropriations Act, 2021, incorporating: Energy Act of 2020 | Incentivized federal building energy efficiency.; Funded development of carbon capture and storage and fossil fuel research.; Weatherized modest- and low-income homes.; Promoted water efficiency and grid battery storage. |
| 2021 | Infrastructure Investment and Jobs Act | Expanded funding for DOE research and development into carbon capture and storage, hydrogen economy tech, battery recycling, and grid battery storage.; Promoted smart grid deployment and resiliency, and workforce development.; Extended tax breaks to nuclear power industry.; Confirmed FERC's backstop siting authority under the EPAct of 2005.; Created ARPA-I. |
| 2022 | CHIPS and Science Act | Expanded funding for DOE research, development and national security initiatives. |
| 2022 | Inflation Reduction Act | Provided funding for a smart grid and forgave debts held by utility cooperatives.; Extended and modified renewable energy tax cuts.; Weatherized low-income homes.; Provided tax incentives for electric vehicles and new appliances.; Prioritized oil exploration ahead of renewables for federal land leases. |
| 2025 | One Big Beautiful Bill Act | Provided a tax exemption for domestic oil companies from the IRA's corporate tax provisions.; Repealed or phased down many of the IRA's tax incentives. |

== See also ==
- List of United States federal environmental statutes
- Fossil fuel regulations in the United States
