= National Energy Act =

1978 American legislation

The National Energy Act of 1978 (NEA78) was a legislative response by the U.S. Congress to the 1973 energy crisis. It included the following statutes:

- Public Utility Regulatory Policies Act (PURPA) (Pub. L. 95–617)
- Energy Tax Act (Pub. L. 95–618)
- National Energy Conservation Policy Act (NECPA) (Pub. L. 95–619)
- Power Plant and Industrial Fuel Use Act (Pub. L. 95–620)
- Natural Gas Policy Act of 1978 (Pub. L. 95–621)

The legislative initiative was introduced by President Jimmy Carter. The package was a major step in legislation regarding the energy field, involving both the supply and the demand side. The package was soon followed by the Energy Security Act, 8 acts signed by president Carter in 1980. This sequel package addressed energy conservation and development of renewable energy sources.

The NEA78 and the "security" package established a framework for:

- Regulatory initiatives,
- Market-based initiatives,
- Energy efficiency programs,
- Tax incentives and disincentives,
- Energy conservation programs, and
- Alternative fuel programs.

Most of the market-based mechanisms have been retained in some form to the present, whereas command and control items have been abandoned.

The next major step in energy legislation in the USA was the Energy Policy Act of 1992.
