= List of federal environmental statutes in the United States =

The United States environmental laws listed below meet the following criteria: (1) they were passed by the United States Congress, and (2) pertain to (a) the regulation of the interaction of humans and the natural environment, or (b) the conservation and/or management of natural or historic resources. They need not be wholly codified in the United States Code.

- Antiquities Act
- Atomic Energy Act of 1946
- Atomic Energy Act of 1954
- Clean Air Act
- Clean Water Act
- Coastal Zone Management Act
- Comprehensive Environmental Response, Compensation and Liability Act (Superfund)
- Emergency Planning and Community Right-to-Know Act
- Endangered Species Act
- Energy Policy Act of 1992
- Energy Policy Act of 2005
- Federal Food, Drug, and Cosmetic Act
- Federal Land Policy and Management Act
- Federal Insecticide, Fungicide, and Rodenticide Act
- Federal Power Act
- Fish and Wildlife Coordination Act
- Food Quality Protection Act
- Fisheries Conservation and Management Act (Magnuson-Stevens)
- Lacey Act
- Marine Mammal Protection Act
- Marine Protection, Research, and Sanctuaries Act
- Migratory Bird Treaty Act
- Mineral Leasing Act
- National Environmental Policy Act
- National Forest Management Act
- National Historic Preservation Act
- National Park Service Organic Act
- Noise Control Act
- Nuclear Waste Policy Act
- Ocean Dumping Act
- Oil Pollution Act
- Resource Conservation and Recovery Act
- Rivers and Harbors Act
- Safe Drinking Water Act
- Surface Mining Control and Reclamation Act
- Toxic Substances Control Act
- Wild and Scenic Rivers Act
- Wilderness Act

== See also ==
- Environmental law
- United States Environmental Protection Agency
- List of international environmental agreements
- List of United States energy acts
- Timeline of major U.S. environmental and occupational health regulation
