= Sun Day =

Annual international event on May 3

Sun Day (May 3, 1978) was designated by United States President Jimmy Carter, specifically devoted to advocacy for solar power, following a joint resolution by Congress, H.J.Res. 715 becoming Pub. L. 95–253. It was modeled on the highly successful Earth Day of April 22, 1970. It was the idea of Denis Hayes, who also coordinated Earth Day in 1970. The date became an international event in 1994.

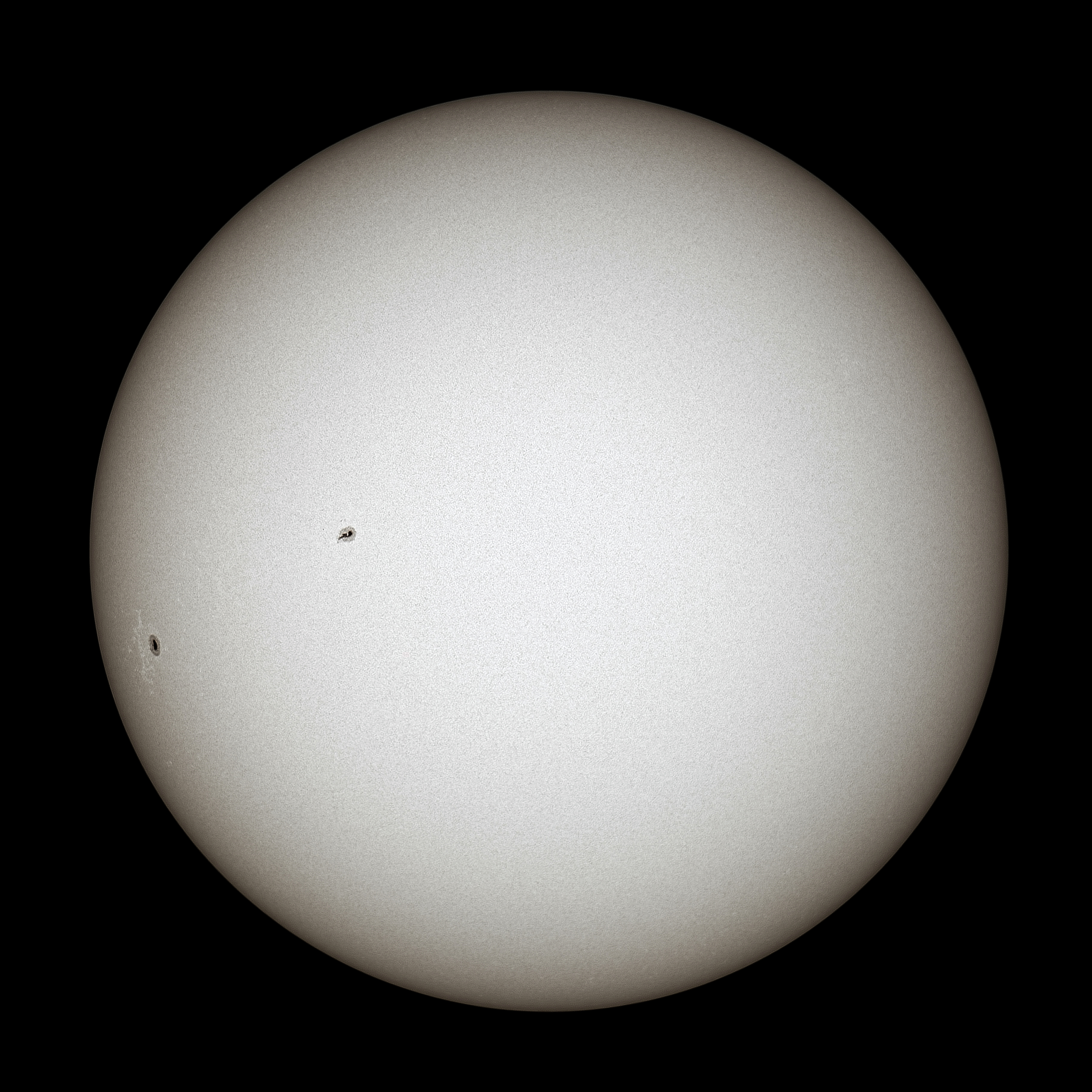
The Sun

== Commemorations ==
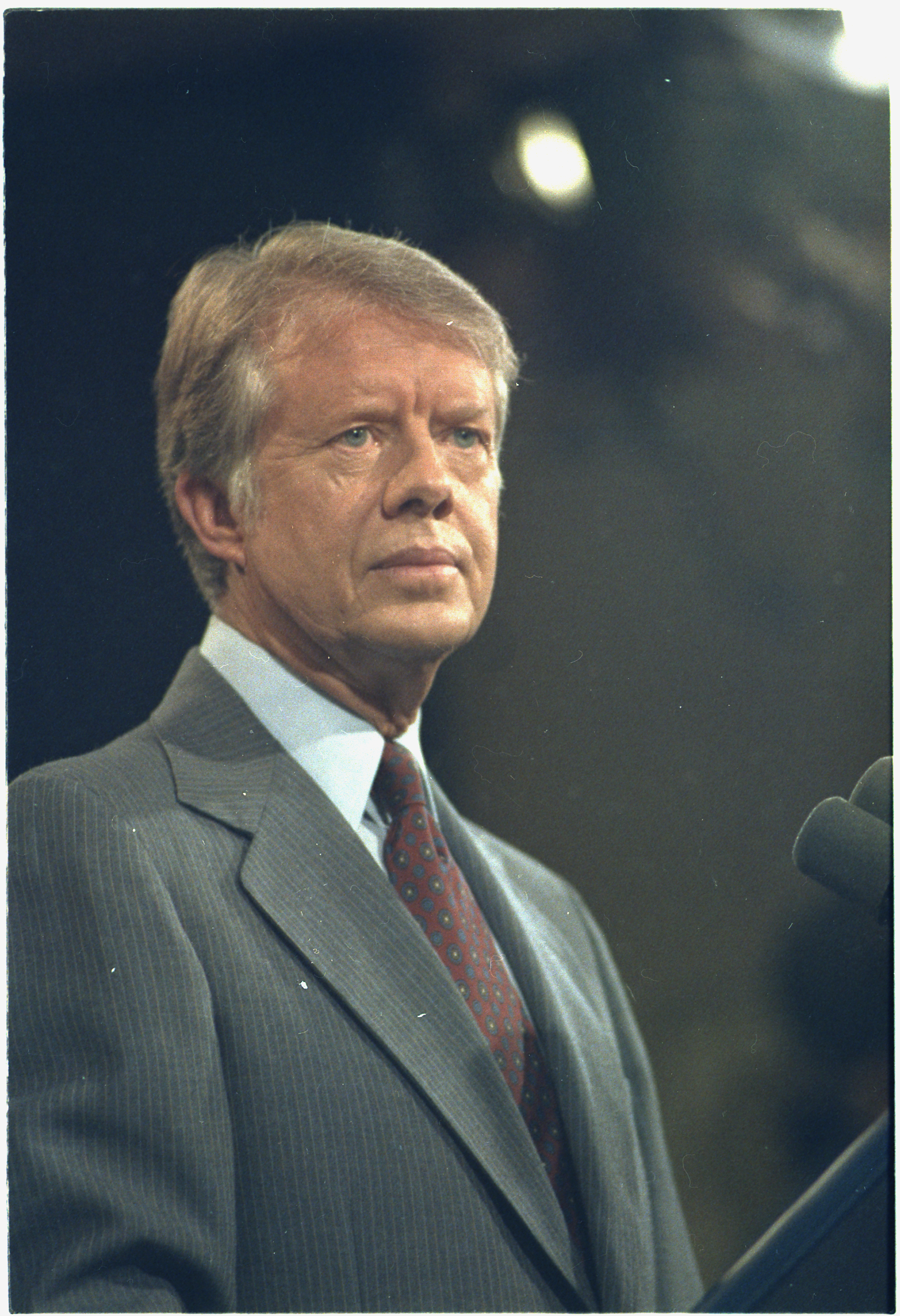
President Carter was a major proponent of solar energy in the U.S.

While President Carter flew to Denver to visit a solar power research institute, others gathered in Cadillac Mountain in Maine where the sun's rays allegedly first touch the United States (although not at that time of the year). A crowd gathered at UN Plaza in New York City to listen to speeches by people such as Robert Redford, who reminded them that the sun "can't be embargoed by any foreign nation". At the Lincoln Memorial in Washington, DC, environmental activist Barry Commoner opined to a group of 500 people that solar power was an issue as pivotal as slavery and that "if Mr. Carter and Energy Secretary Schlesinger won't talk about solar energy, it's time that we did," and that solar power was the "one solution to the economic problems of the United States." Other events on the National Mall included a Marathon, speeches by Senators Ted Kennedy and Ralph Nader, and a concert with Jackson Browne. In DC, the event was so popular that it resulted in a single day ridership record for Metrorail of 197,201, breaking the record set a month earlier; the record only lasted for 5 weeks, when it was broken by the Washington Bullets NBA Championship victory parade.

Events were planned in twenty-two countries around the world.
