= Power Plant and Industrial Fuel Use Act =

The Power Plant and Industrial Fuel Use Act (FUA) was an act enacted in 1978 by the U.S. Congress which prohibited:

- The use of natural gas or petroleum as an energy source in any new electric power plant; and
- Construction of any new electric power plant without the capability to use coal or any alternate fuel as a primary energy source.

It prohibited the use of natural gas or petroleum as the primary energy source in a new major fuel-burning installation (MFBI) consisting of a boiler.

The legislation was part of the National Energy Plan of President Jimmy Carter.

== Objectives ==
The major purposes of the FUA program were:

To reduce the importation of petroleum.

Increase the nation's use of indigenous energy resources.

To conserve natural gas and petroleum and minimize their use as primary energy source.

To foster greater use of coal.

To encourage the use of synthetic fuels.

To reduce the vulnerability of the US to energy-supply interruptions.

== Criticism ==
Due to the requirements of coal as one source of fuel for energy power plants, environmentalists expressed the concern about power plants burning more coal without the imposition of stricter sulphur dioxide emission controls, because that this could increase the risk the acid rain.
