= Energy Security Act =

United States federal law concerning domestic fuel and electricity supply

- Other short titles: Acid Precipitation Act of 1980; Biomass Energy and Alcohol Fuels Act of 1980; Defense Production Act Amendments of 1980; Geothermal Energy Act of 1980; Renewable Energy Resources Act of 1980; Solar Energy and Energy Conservation Act of 1980; United States Synthetic Fuels Corporation Act of 1980
- Long title: An Act to extend the Defense Production Act of 1950, and for other purposes.
- Nicknames: Defense Production Act Amendments of 1980
- Enacted by: the 96th United States Congress
- Effective: June 30, 1980

Citations
- Public law: 96-294
- Statutes at Large: 94 Stat. 611

Codification
- Titles amended: 42 U.S.C.: Public Health and Social Welfare; 50 U.S.C.: War and National Defense
- U.S.C. sections created: 42 U.S.C. ch. 95 § 8701
- U.S.C. sections amended: 50 U.S.C. Appendix § 2061, Defense Production Act of 1950

Legislative history
- Introduced in the Senate as S. 932 by William Proxmire (D–WI) on April 9, 1979; Committee consideration by Senate Banking, Housing, and Urban Affairs, Senate Energy and Natural Resources; Passed the Senate on June 20, 1979 (passed); Passed the House on June 26, 1979 (368-25, in lieu of H.R. 3930); Reported by the joint conference committee on June 18, 1980; agreed to by the Senate on June 19, 1980 (78-12) and by the House on June 26, 1980 (317-93); Signed into law by President Jimmy Carter on June 30, 1980

The Energy Security Act was signed into law by U.S. President Jimmy Carter on June 30, 1980. It consisted of six major acts:

== Biomass Energy and Alcohol Fuels Act ==
The Biomass Energy and Alcohol Fuels Act of 1980 addresses general biomass energy development in its various forms, and the use of gasohol. The purpose of the statute is to reduce the dependence of the United States on imported petroleum and natural gas. It is law that had been enacted by the U.S. Congress for the production and use of biomass energy. It also provided for the use of municipal waste biomass energy and rural, agricultural, and forestry biomass energy.

For general biomass energy development, the Secretary of Agriculture and Secretary of Energy were required by the act to jointly prepare and transmit to the President and the Congress, a plan for maximizing biomass energy production and use. The act required the plan to be designed to achieve a total level of alcohol production and use within the United States of at least 60,000 barrels per day of alcohol by December 31, 1982. For municipal waste biomass energy, the Secretary of Energy was to prepare a report and transmit it to the President and Congress. The Secretary of Agriculture was to prepare such a report for rural, agricultural, and forestry biomass energy.

== Renewable Energy Resources Act ==
The Renewable Energy Resources Act of 1980 sought to incentivize the use of renewable energy resources, any energy resource which has recently originated in the sun, including direct and indirect solar radiation and intermediate solar energy forms such as wind, ocean thermal gradients, ocean currents and waves, hydropower, photovoltaic energy, products of photosynthetic processes, organic wastes, and others.

== Solar Energy and Energy Conservation Act ==
The Solar Energy and Energy Conservation Act of 1980 (SEECA) has since been repealed. It established the Solar Energy and Energy Conservation Bank in the Department of Housing and Urban Development. It provided that the Bank shall have the same powers as those granted to the Government National Mortgage Association (GNMA) by the National Housing Act. However, the legislation terminated the Bank after September 30, 1987. It also established as part of the Bank, an Energy Conservation Advisory Committee to assist the Bank in carrying out the activities of the Bank which relate to residential and commercial energy conserving improvements, and that a Solar Energy Advisory Committee to provide advice to assist the Bank in carrying out the activities of the Bank which relate to solar energy systems. Due to the scheduled expiration, pursuant to SEECA law, of the Bank's authorization, the Bank ceased operations in 1988.

== Geothermal Energy Act ==
The Geothermal Energy Act of 1980 (GEA) addresses geothermal energy legislation . Domestic geothermal reserves could be developed into regionally significant energy sources promoting the economic health as well as the national security of the United States. However, there were institutional and economic barriers to the commercialization of geothermal technology, and federal agencies should consider the use of geothermal energy for government buildings.

The majority of the subsections of the act address the financial and insurance issues of geothermal energy production. Prior to this legislation was the Federal Geothermal Research, Development and Demonstration Act of 1974.

== Ocean Thermal Energy Conversion Act ==
The Ocean Thermal Energy Conversion Act of 1980 (OTECA) addressed ocean thermal energy conversion, the extraction of energy from the thermal differentials of subsea and surface water in regions with tropical oceans. The OTECA activities by means of three main functions. Firstly, the regulation of ocean thermal energy conversion (OTEC) facilities and plantships, maritime financing of such facilities and plantships,and enforcement of law and regulations concerning this issue. It establishes rules for the protection of the environment as well as to ensure the protection of life and property.

For the purposes of the Merchant Marine Act (1936), any ship providing service for OTEC facilities shall be considered "be deemed to be used in, and used in an essential service in, the foreign commerce or foreign trade of the United States." This was to allow financing under the 1936 act. The act limits the ownership, construction and operation of offshore ocean thermal energy facilities and plantships to those licensed by the National Oceanic and Atmospheric Administration (NOAA).

== See also ==
- Energy security
- Energy Independence and Security Act of 2007
