= List of Department of Energy appointments by Donald Trump =

Key
Appointees serving in offices that did not require Senate confirmation.
Appointees confirmed by the Senate who are currently serving or served through the entire term.
Appointees awaiting Senate confirmation.
Appointees serving in an acting capacity.
Appointees who have left office after confirmation or offices which have been disbanded.
Nominees who were withdrawn prior to being confirmed or assuming office.

== Appointments (first administration) ==
Office	Nominee	Assumed office	Left office
Secretary of Energy	Dan Brouillette	December 11, 2019 (Confirmed December 2, 2019, 70–15)	January 20, 2021
Secretary of Energy	Rick Perry	March 2, 2017 (Confirmed March 2, 2017, 62–37)	December 1, 2019
Deputy Secretary of Energy	Mark Menezes	August 4, 2020 (Confirmed August 4, 2020, 79–16)	January 20, 2021
Deputy Secretary of Energy	Mark Menezes	December 4, 2019	August 4, 2020
Deputy Secretary of Energy	Dan Brouillette	August 7, 2017 (Confirmed August 3, 2017, 79–17)	December 4, 2019
Office of the Secretary of Energy
General Counsel of Energy	William Cooper	May 9, 2019 (Confirmed April 30, 2019, 68–31)	January 20, 2021
General Counsel of Energy	David S. Jonas	Nomination lapsed and returned to the President on January 3, 2018	
Inspector General of Energy	Teri L. Donaldson	January 23, 2019 (Confirmed January 2, 2019, voice vote)	January 24, 2025
Chief Financial Officer of Energy	John G. Vonglis	December 2017 (Confirmed December 21, 2017, voice vote)	May 2019
Assistant Secretary of Energy (International Affairs)	Theodore J. Garrish	April 12, 2018 (Confirmed April 9, 2018, voice vote)	January 20, 2021
Assistant Secretary of Energy (Congressional and Intergovernmental Affairs)	Melissa F. Burnison	February 21, 2018 (Confirmed February 15, 2018, voice vote)	January 20, 2021
Science and Energy
Under Secretary of Energy (Science & Energy)	Paul Dabbar	November 7, 2017 (Confirmed November 2, 2017, voice vote)	January 20, 2021
Director of the Office of Science	Chris Fall	May 31, 2019 (Confirmed May 23, 2019, voice vote)	January 20, 2021
Assistant Secretary of Energy (Energy Efficiency and Renewable Energy)	Daniel Simmons	January 17, 2019 (Confirmed January 2, 2019, voice vote)	January 20, 2021
Assistant Secretary of Energy (Fossil Energy)	Steven Winberg	November 27, 2017 (Confirmed November 2, 2017, voice vote)	January 2021
Assistant Secretary of Energy (Nuclear Energy)	Rita Baranwal	July 11, 2019 (Confirmed June 20, 2019, 86–5)	January 8, 2021
Assistant Secretary of Energy (Energy, Electricity, Delivery and Energy Reliability)	Bruce J. Walker	October 16, 2017 (Confirmed October 5, 2017, voice vote)	October 2020
Management & Performance
Under Secretary of Energy (Management & Performance)	Mark Menezes	November 6, 2017 (Confirmed November 2, 2017, voice vote)	August 4, 2020
Director of the Office of Economic Impact and Diversity	James E Campos	April 9, 2018 (Confirmed April 9, 2018 by voice vote)	January 20, 2021
Assistant Secretary of Energy (Environmental Management)	Anne Marie White	March 2018 (Confirmed March 22, 2018, voice)	June 2019
Assistant Secretary of Energy (Cybersecurity, Energy Security and Emergency Response)	Karen Evans	September 4, 2018 (Confirmed August 28, 2018, voice)	February 14, 2020
National Nuclear Security Administration
Under Secretary of Energy (Nuclear Security); Administrator of the National Nuclear Security Administration	Lisa Gordon-Hagerty	February 22, 2018 (Confirmed February 15, 2018, voice vote)	November 6, 2020
Principal Deputy Administrator	William Bookless	May 31, 2019 (Confirmed May 23, 2019, voice vote)	January 20, 2021
Deputy Administrator for Defense Programs	Charles P. Verdon	October 9, 2018 (Confirmed September 18, 2018, voice vote)	
Deputy Administrator for Defense Nuclear Nonproliferation	Brent K. Park	April 3, 2018 (Confirmed March 22, 2018, voice vote)	January 20, 2021
Advanced Research Projects Agency
Director of the Advanced Research Projects Agency	Lane Genatowski	July 11, 2019 (Confirmed June 27, 2019, voice vote)	January 20, 2021
Energy Information Administration
Administrator of the Energy Information Administration	Linda Capuano	January 9, 2018 (Confirmed December 21, 2017, voice vote)	January 20, 2021
Federal Energy Regulatory Commission
Chairman of the Federal Energy Regulatory Commission	James Danly	November 5, 2020 (Designated by the President)	January 21, 2021
Chairman of the Federal Energy Regulatory Commission	Kevin J. McIntyre	December 7, 2017 (Designated by the President)	October 22, 2018
Chairman of the Federal Energy Regulatory Commission	Neil Chatterjee	October 24, 2018 (Designated by the President)	November 5, 2020
Chairman of the Federal Energy Regulatory Commission	Neil Chatterjee	August 10, 2017 (Designated by the President)	December 7, 2017
Commissioner of the Federal Energy Regulatory Commission	Neil Chatterjee	August 10, 2017 (Confirmed August 3, 2017, voice vote)	August 30, 2021
Commissioner of the Federal Energy Regulatory Commission	Mark Christie	January 4, 2021 (Confirmed November 30, 2020, voice vote)	August 8, 2025
Commissioner of the Federal Energy Regulatory Commission	Allison Clements	December 8, 2020 (Confirmed November 30, 2020, voice vote)	June 30, 2024
Commissioner of the Federal Energy Regulatory Commission	James Danly	March 31, 2020 (Confirmed March 12, 2020, 52–40)	January 3, 2024
Commissioner of the Federal Energy Regulatory Commission	Bernard McNamee	December 11, 2018 (Confirmed December 6, 2018, 50–49)	September 4, 2020
Commissioner of the Federal Energy Regulatory Commission	Kevin J. McIntyre	December 7, 2017 (Confirmed November 2, 2017, voice vote) Reappointment (Confirmed November 2, 2017, voice vote)	January 2, 2019
Commissioner of the Federal Energy Regulatory Commission	Richard Glick	November 29, 2017 (Confirmed November 2, 2017, voice vote)	January 3, 2023
Commissioner of the Federal Energy Regulatory Commission	Robert Powelson	August 10, 2017 (Confirmed August 3, 2017, voice vote)	July 1, 2018

== Appointments (second administration) ==
Office	Nominee	Assumed office	Left office
Secretary of Energy	Chris Wright	February 4, 2025 (Confirmed February 3, 2025, 59–38)	
Secretary of Energy	Ingrid Kolb	January 20, 2025	February 4, 2025
Deputy Secretary of Energy	James Danly	June 11, 2025 (Confirmed May 13, 2025, 52–44)	
General Counsel of Energy	Jonathan Brightbill	October 3, 2025 (Confirmed* September 18, 2025, 51–44); *En bloc confirmation of 48 nominees.	
Chief Financial Officer of Energy	Tina Pierce	October 3, 2025 (Confirmed* September 18, 2025, 51–44); *En bloc confirmation of 48 nominees.	July 3, 2026
Under Secretary of Energy for Infrastructure	Kyle Haustveit	May 22, 2026 (Confirmed* May 18, 2026, 46–43); *En bloc confirmation of 49 nominees.	
Under Secretary of Energy for Infrastructure	Alex Fitzsimmons	October 20, 2025	May 22, 2026
Under Secretary of Energy for Infrastructure	Preston Wells Griffith III	July 10, 2025 (Confirmed July 9, 2025, 54-43)	October 20, 2025
Under Secretary of Energy for Infrastructure	Kathleen Hogan	January 20, 2025	July 10, 2025
Under Secretary of Energy for Science and Innovation	Darío Gil	September 26, 2025 (Confirmed* September 18, 2025, 51–44); *En bloc confirmation of 48 nominees.	
Assistant Secretary of Energy for Nuclear Energy	Theodore J. Garrish	September 26, 2025 (Confirmed* September 18, 2025, 51–44); *En bloc confirmation of 48 nominees.	
Assistant Secretary of Energy for Electricity	Catherine Jereza	October 14, 2025 (Confirmed* October 7, 2025, 51–47); *En bloc confirmation of 107 nominees.	
Assistant Secretary of Energy for Hydrocarbons and Geothermal Energy	Toby Deen	Awaiting Senate Confirmation	
Assistant Secretary of Energy for Hydrocarbons and Geothermal Energy	Kyle Haustveit	September 19, 2025 (Confirmed* September 18, 2025, 51–44); *En bloc confirmation of 48 nominees.	May 22, 2026
Assistant Secretary of Energy for International Affairs	Kaveh Farzad	August 2026 (Confirmed* August 7, 2026, 51–47); *En bloc confirmation of 74 nominees.	
Assistant Secretary of Energy for International Affairs	David Eisner	Nomination withdrawn by the President on July 30, 2025	
Assistant Secretary of Energy for Energy Efficiency and Renewables	Audrey Robertson	October 23, 2025 (Confirmed* October 7, 2025, 51–47); *En bloc confirmation of 107 nominees.	
Assistant Secretary of Energy for Environmental Management	Timothy John Walsh	October 23, 2025 (Confirmed* October 7, 2025, 51–47); *En bloc confirmation of 107 nominees.	
National Nuclear Security Administration
Under Secretary of Energy for Nuclear Security and Administrator of the National Nuclear Security Administration	Brandon Williams	September 26, 2025 (Confirmed* September 18, 2025, 51–44); *En bloc confirmation of 48 nominees.	
Under Secretary of Energy for Nuclear Security and Administrator of the National Nuclear Security Administration	Teresa Robbins	January 20, 2025	September 26, 2025
Principal Deputy Administrator	Scott Pappano	September 26, 2025 (Confirmed* September 18, 2025, 51–44); *En bloc confirmation of 48 nominees.	
Deputy Administrator for Defense Programs	David Beck	January 2026 (Confirmed* December 18, 2025, 53–43); *En bloc confirmation of 97 nominees.	
Deputy Administrator for Defense Nuclear Nonproliferation	Matthew Clark Napoli	October 3, 2025 (Confirmed* September 18, 2025, 51–44); *En bloc confirmation of 48 nominees.	
Advanced Research Projects Agency
Director of the Advanced Research Projects Agency	Conner Prochaska	September 22, 2025 (Confirmed* September 18, 2025, 51–44); *En bloc confirmation of 48 nominees.	
Energy Information Administration
Administrator of the Energy Information Administration	Tristan Abbey	September 25, 2025 (Confirmed* September 18, 2025, 51–44); *En bloc confirmation of 48 nominees.	
Administrator of the Energy Information Administration	Stephen Nalley	January 20, 2025	September 25, 2025

== Notes ==
=== Confirmation votes ===
Confirmations by roll call vote (first administration)

Confirmations by voice vote (first administration)

Confirmations by roll call vote (second administration)

Confirmations by voice vote (second administration)
