= Natural gas storage =

Facilities for storing natural gas

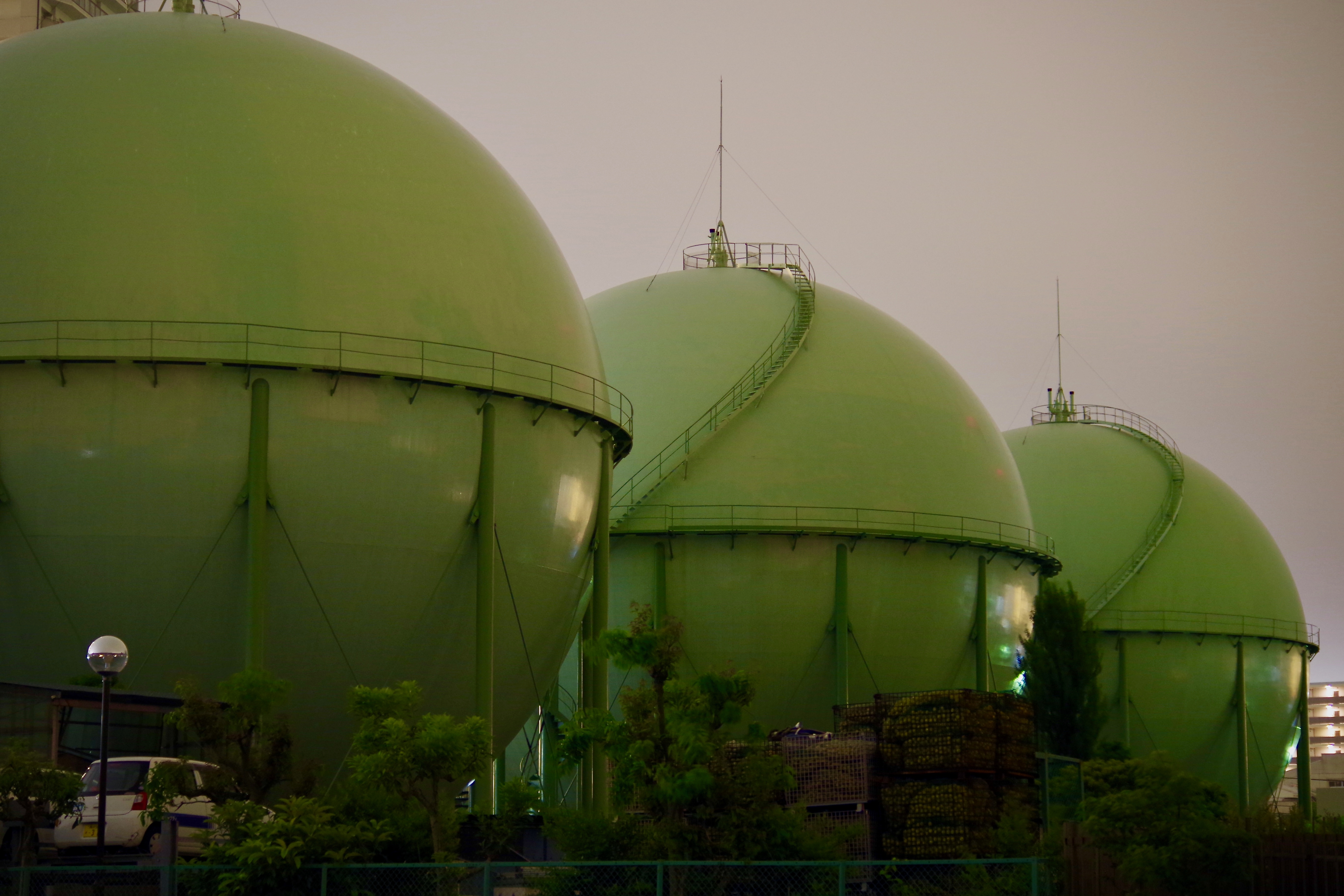
Spherical tanks storing compressed natural gas

Natural gas is a commodity that can be stored for an indefinite period of time in natural gas storage facilities for later consumption.

== Usage ==
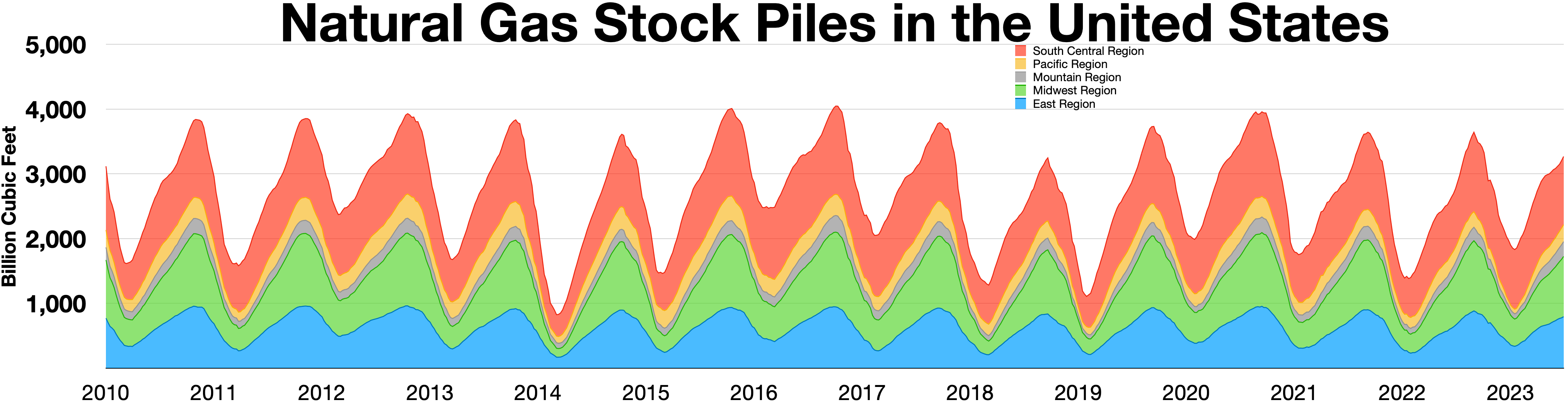
Natural Gas Stockpiles Natural gas stock piles peak in early November South Central Region Pacific Region Mountain Region Midwest Region East Region

Gas storage is principally used to meet load variations. Gas is injected into storage during periods of low demand and withdrawn from storage during periods of peak demand. It is also used for a variety of secondary purposes, including:

- Balancing the flow in pipeline systems. This is performed by mainline transmission pipeline companies to maintain operational integrity of the pipelines, by ensuring that the pipeline pressures are kept within design parameters.
- Maintaining contractual balance. Shippers use stored gas to maintain the volume they deliver to the pipeline system and the volume they withdraw. Without access to such storage facilities, any imbalance situation would result in a hefty penalty.
- Leveling production over periods of fluctuating demand. Producers use storage to store any gas that is not immediately marketable, typically over the summer when demand is low and deliver it in the winter months when the demand is high.
- Market speculation. Producers and marketers use gas storage as a speculative tool, storing gas when they believe that prices will increase in the future and then selling it when it does reach those levels.
- Insuring against any unforeseen accidents. Gas storage can be used as an insurance that may affect either production or delivery of natural gas. These may include natural factors such as hurricanes, or malfunction of production or distribution systems.
- Meeting regulatory obligations. Gas storage ensures to some extent the reliability of gas supply to the consumer at the lowest cost, as required by the regulatory body. This is why the regulatory body monitors storage inventory levels.
- Reducing price volatility. Gas storage ensures commodity liquidity at the market centers. This helps contain natural gas high price fluctuations over the short run and uncertainty.
- Offsetting changes in natural gas demands. Gas storage facilities are gaining more importance due to changes in natural gas demands. First, traditional supplies that once met the winter peak demand are now unable to keep pace. Second, there is a growing summer peak demand on natural gas, due to electric generation via gas fired power plants.

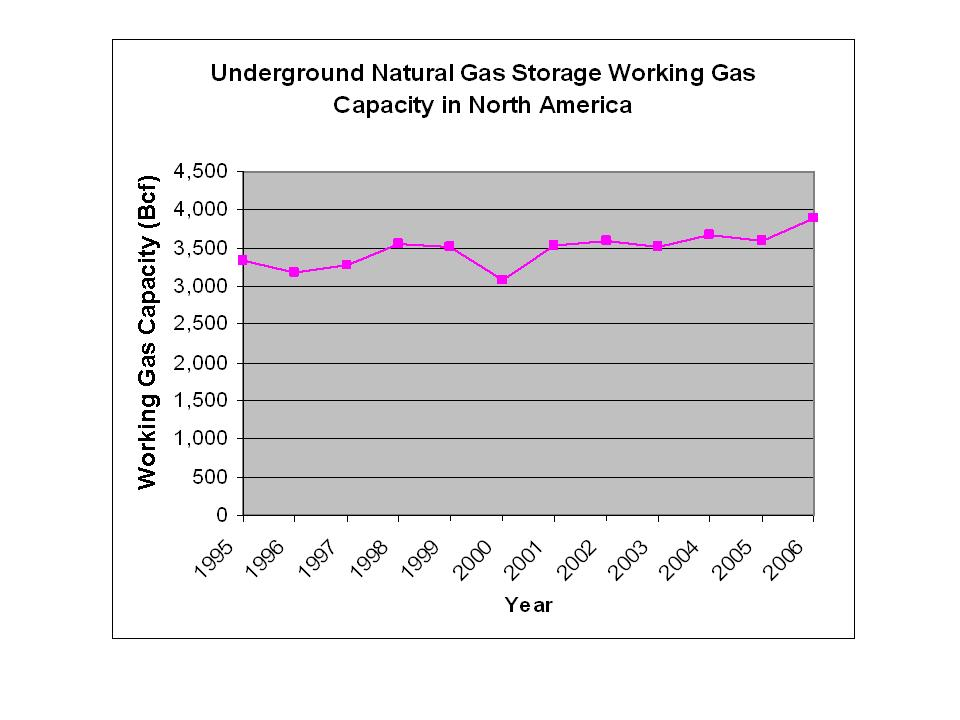
Datasource.

== Measures and definitions ==
A number of metrics are used to define and measure the volume of an underground storage facility:

- Total gas storage capacity: It is the maximum volume of natural gas that can be stored at the storage facility. It is determined by several physical factors such as the reservoir volume, and also on the operating procedures and engineering methods used.
- Total gas in storage: It is the total volume of gas in storage at the facility at a particular time.
- Base gas (also referred to as cushion gas): It is the volume of gas that is intended as permanent inventory in a storage reservoir to maintain adequate pressure and deliverability rates throughout the withdrawal season.
- Working gas capacity: It is the total gas storage capacity minus the base gas.
- Working gas: It is the total gas in storage minus the base gas. Working gas is the volume of gas available to the market place at a particular time.
- Physically unrecoverable gas: The amount of gas that becomes permanently embedded in the formation of the storage facility and that can never be extracted.
- Cycling rate: It is the average number of times a reservoir’s working gas volume can be turned over during a specific period of time. Typically the period of time used is one year.
- Deliverability: It is a measure of the amount of gas that can be delivered (withdrawn) from a storage facility on a daily basis. It is also referred to as the deliverability rate, withdrawal rate, or withdrawal capacity and is usually expressed in terms of millions of cubic feet of gas per day that can be delivered.
- Injection capacity (or rate): It is the amount of gas that can be injected into a storage facility on a daily basis. It can be thought of as the complement of the deliverability. Injection rate is also typically measured in millions of cubic feet of gas that can be delivered per day.

The measurements above are not fixed for a given storage facility. For example, deliverability depends on several factors including the amount of gas in the reservoir and the pressure etc. Generally, a storage facility’s deliverability rate varies directly with the total amount of gas in the reservoir. It is at its highest when the reservoir is full and declines as gas is withdrawn. The injection capacity of a storage facility is also variable and depends on factors similar to those that affect deliverability. The injection rate varies inversely with the total amount of gas in storage. It is at its highest when the reservoir is nearly empty and declines as more gas is injected. The storage facility operator may also change operational parameters. This would allow, for example, the storage capacity maximum to be increased, the withdrawal of base gas during very high demand or reclassifying base gas to working gas if technological advances or engineering procedures allow.

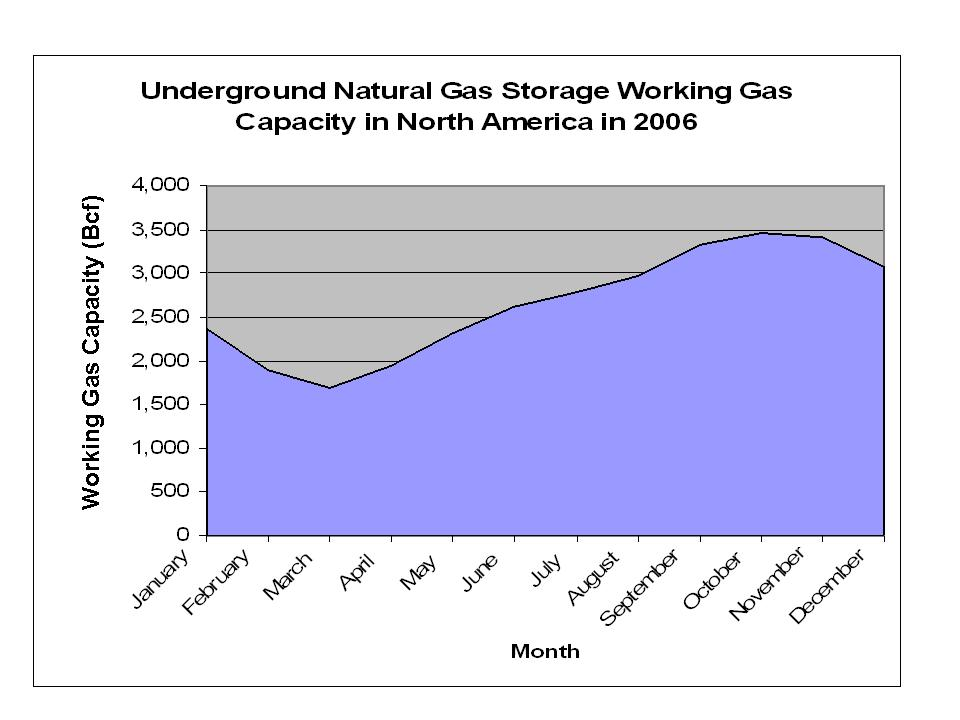
Datasource.

== Types ==
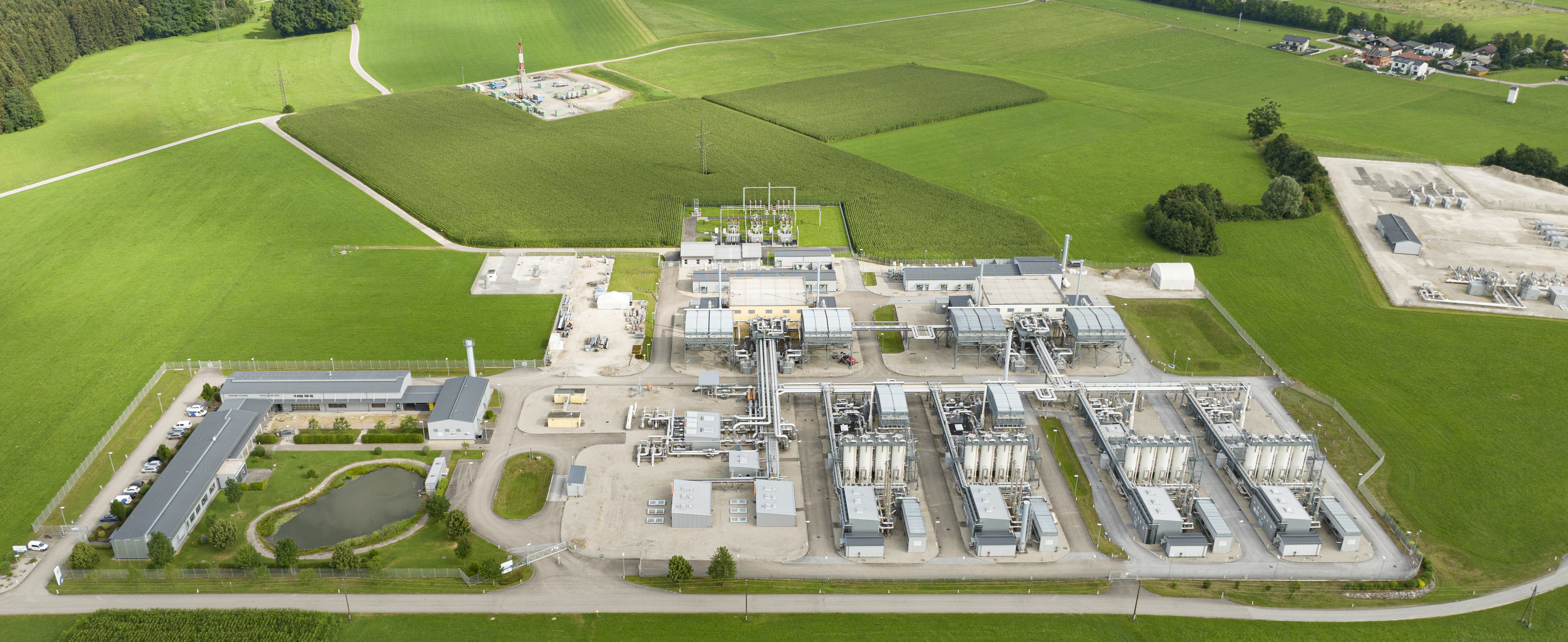
Equipment of an underground natural gas storage facility in Austria

The most important type of gas storage is in underground reservoirs. There are three principal types — depleted gas reservoirs, aquifer reservoirs and salt cavern reservoirs. Each of these types has distinct physical and economic characteristics which govern the suitability of a particular type of storage type for a given application.

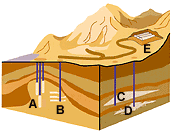
Natural gas is stored in underground (A) salt formations, (C) aquifer reservoirs and (D) depleted reservoirs.

=== Depleted gas reservoir ===
These are the most prominent and common form of underground storage of natural gas. They are the reservoir formations of natural gas fields that have produced all or part of their economically recoverable gas. The depleted reservoir formation should be readily capable of holding sufficient volumes of injected natural gas in the pore space between grains (via high porosity), of storing and delivering natural gas at sufficient economic rates (via high permeability) and be contained so that natural gas cannot migrate into other formations and be lost. In addition the rock (both the reservoir and the seal) should be capable of withstanding the repeated cycle of an increase in pressure when natural gas is injected into the reservoir and in reverse the drop in pressure when natural gas is produced.

Using such a facility that meets the above criteria is economically attractive because it allows the re-use, with suitable modification, of the extraction and distribution infrastructure remaining from the productive life of the gas field which reduces the start-up costs. Depleted reservoirs are also attractive because their geological and physical characteristics have already been studied by geologists and petroleum engineers and are usually well known. Consequently, depleted reservoirs are generally the cheapest and easiest to develop, operate, and maintain of the three types of underground storage.

In order to maintain working pressures in depleted reservoirs, about 50 percent of the natural gas in the formation must be kept as cushion gas. However, since depleted reservoirs were previously filled with natural gas and hydrocarbons, they do not require the injection of gas that will become physically unrecoverable as this is already present in the formation. This provides a further economic boost for this type of facility, particularly when the cost of gas is high. Typically, these facilities are operated on a single annual cycle; gas is injected during the off-peak summer months and withdrawn during the winter months of peak demand.

A number of factors determine whether or not a depleted gas field will make an economically viable storage facility:

- The reservoir must be of sufficient quality in terms of porosity and permeability to allow storage and production to meet demand as required;
- Natural gas must be contained by effective seals otherwise there will be lost volumes that cannot be recovered;
- The depleted reservoir and field infrastructure must be close to gas markets;
- The existing infrastructure must be suitable for retrofitting the equipment to inject and produce gas at the necessary pressures and rates;

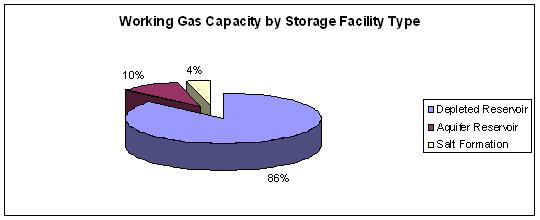
Datasource.

=== Aquifer reservoir ===
Aquifers are underground, porous and permeable rock formations that act as natural water reservoirs. In some cases they can be used for natural gas storage. Usually these facilities are operated on a single annual cycle as with depleted reservoirs. The geological and physical characteristics of aquifer formation are not known ahead of time and a significant investment has to go into investigating these and evaluating the aquifer’s suitability for natural gas storage.

If the aquifer is suitable, all of the associated infrastructure must be developed from scratch, increasing the development costs compared to depleted reservoirs. This includes installation of wells, extraction equipment, pipelines, dehydration facilities, and possibly compression equipment. Since the aquifer initially contains water there is little or no naturally occurring gas in the formation and of the gas injected some will be physically unrecoverable. As a result, aquifer storage typically requires significantly more cushion gas than depleted reservoirs; up to 80% of the total gas volume. Most aquifer storage facilities were developed when the price of natural gas was low, meaning this cushion gas was inexpensive to sacrifice. With rising gas prices aquifer storage becomes more expensive to develop.

A consequence of the above factors is that developing an aquifer storage facility is usually time consuming and expensive. Aquifers are generally the least desirable and most expensive type of natural gas storage facility.

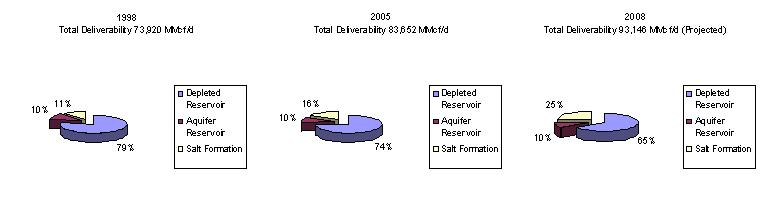
Total Deliverability from Natural Gas Storage by Type of Facility, 1998, 2005, 2008.

=== Salt formation ===
Underground salt formations are well suited to natural gas storage. Salt caverns allow very little of the injected natural gas to escape from storage unless specifically extracted. The walls of a salt cavern are strong and impervious to gas over the lifespan of the storage facility.

Once a salt feature is discovered and found to be suitable for the development of a gas storage facility a cavern is created within the salt feature. This is done by the process of solution mining. Fresh water is pumped down a borehole into the salt. Some of the salt is dissolved leaving a void and the water, now saline, is pumped back to the surface. The process continues until the cavern is the desired size, some are 800 m tall and 50 m diameter with a volume of around ½ million m^{3}. Once created, a salt cavern offers an underground natural gas storage vessel with high deliverability. Cushion gas requirements are lower, typically about 33 percent of total gas capacity.

Salt caverns are usually much smaller than depleted gas reservoir and aquifer storage facilities. A salt cavern facility may occupy only one one-hundredth of the area taken up by a depleted gas reservoir facility. Consequently, salt caverns cannot hold the large volumes of gas necessary to meet base load storage requirements. Deliverability from salt caverns is, however, much higher than for either aquifers or depleted reservoirs. This allows the gas stored in a salt cavern to be withdrawn and replenished more readily and quickly. This faster cycle-time is useful in emergency situations or during short periods of unexpected demand surges.

Although construction is more costly than depleted field conversions when measured on the basis of dollars per thousand cubic feet of working gas, the ability to perform several withdrawal and injection cycles each year reduces the effective cost.

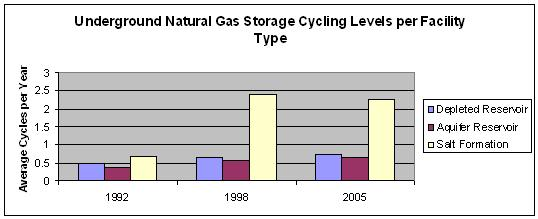
Datasource.

Gas Storage Facility Operations
| Type | Cushion Gas | Injection Period (Days) | Withdrawal Period (Days) |
|---|---|---|---|
| Depleted Reservoir | 50% | 200-250 | 100-150 |
| Aquifer Reservoir | 50%-80% | 200-250 | 100-150 |
| Salt Formation | 20%-30% | 20-40 | 10-20 |

=== Other ===
There are also other types of storage such as:

==== Liquefied Natural Gas ====
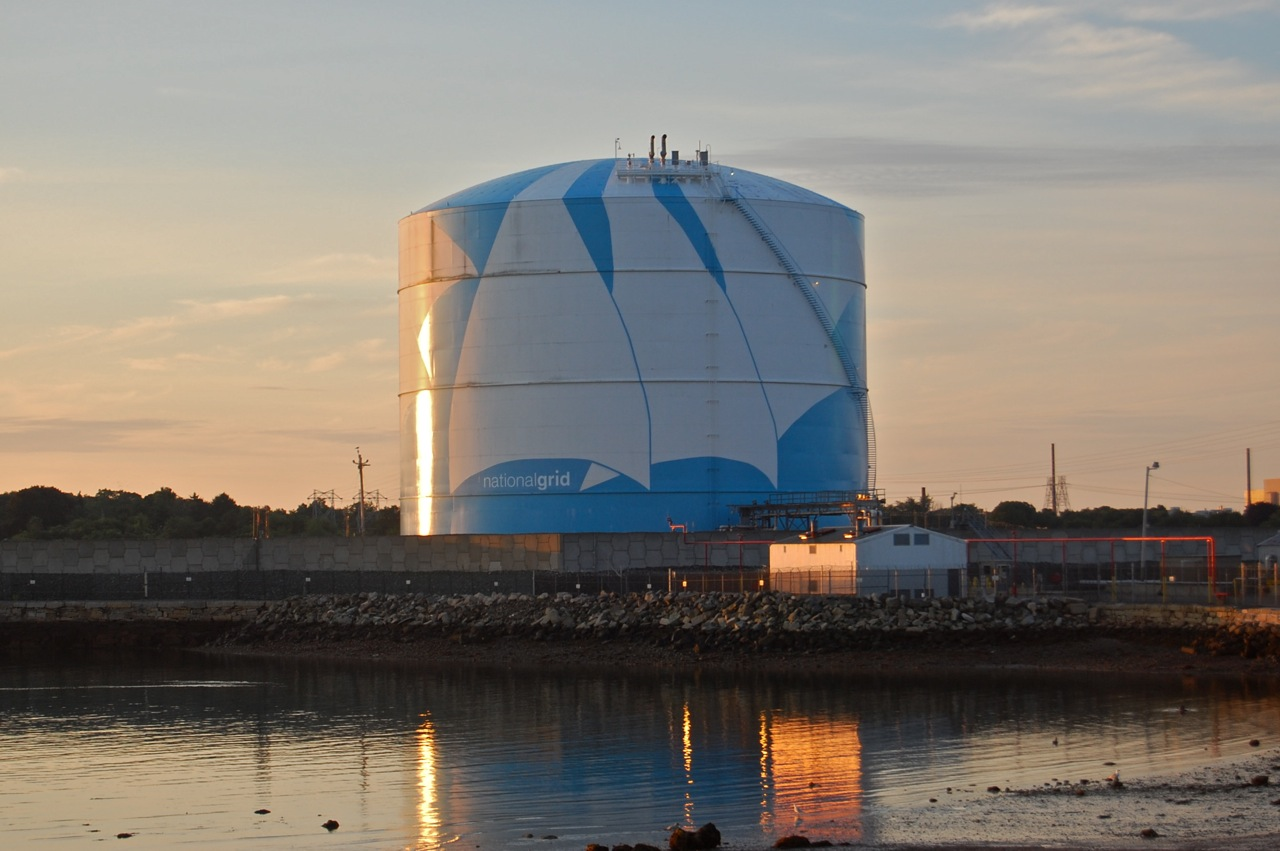
A liquefied natural gas storage tank in Massachusetts.

Liquefied Natural Gas (LNG) facilities provide delivery capacity during peak periods when market demand exceeds pipeline deliverability. LNG storage tanks possess a number of advantages over underground storage. As a liquid at approximately −163 °C (−260 °F), it occupies about 600 times less space than gas stored underground, and it provides high deliverability at very short notice because LNG storage facilities are generally located close to market and can be trucked to some customers avoiding pipeline tolls. There is no requirement for cushion gas and it allows access to a global supply. LNG facilities are, however, more expensive to build and maintain than developing new underground storage facilities.

==== Pipeline capacity ====
Gas can be temporarily stored in the pipeline system, through a process called line packing. This is done by packing more gas into the pipeline by increasing the pressure. During periods of high demand, greater quantities of gas can be withdrawn from the pipeline in the market area than is injected at the production area. This process is usually performed during off peak times to meet the next day’s peaking demands. This method provides a temporary short-term substitute for traditional underground storage.

==== Gasholders ====
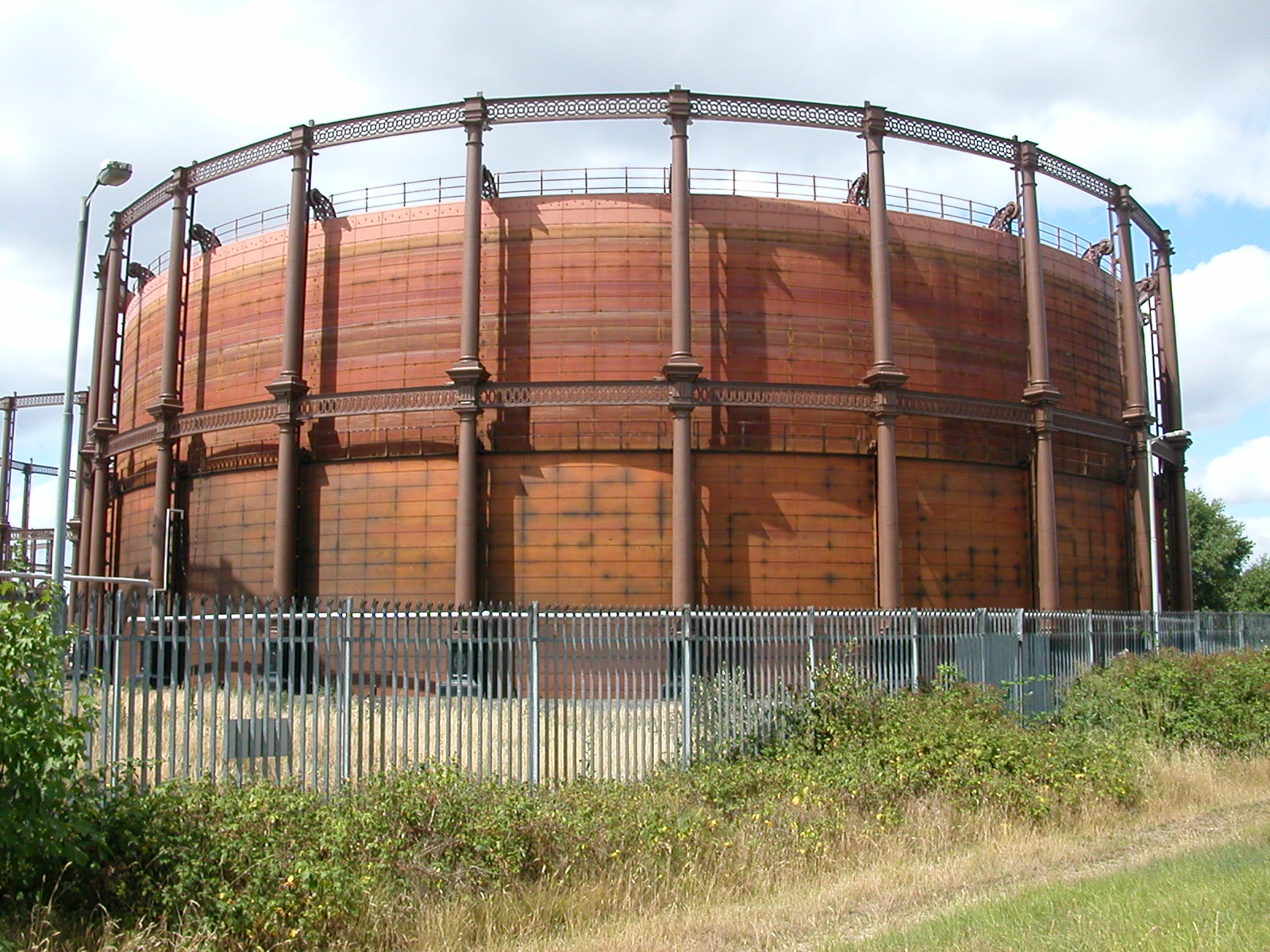
An older column-guided gasholder in West Ham, London

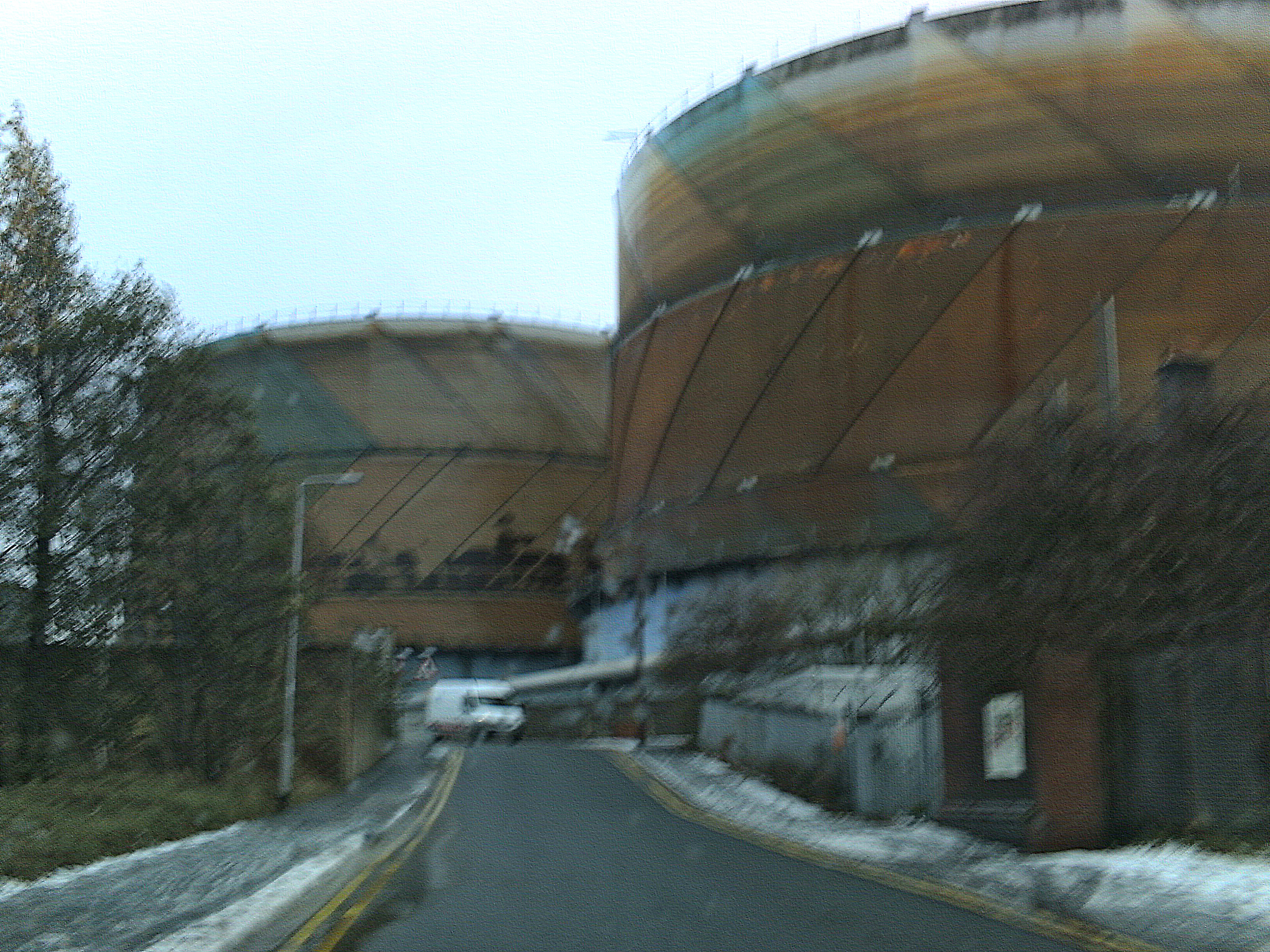
1960s-built spiral-guided gasholders in Hunslet, Leeds

Gas can be stored above ground in a gasholder (or gasometer), largely for balancing, not long-term storage, and this has been done since Victorian times. These store gas at district pressure, meaning that they can provide extra gas very quickly at peak times. Gasholders are perhaps most used in the United Kingdom and Germany. There are two kinds of gasholder — column-guided, which are guided up by a large frame that is always visible, regardless of the position of the holder; and spiral-guided, which have no frame and are guided up by concentric runners in the previous lift.

Perhaps the most famous British gasholder is the large column-guided "Oval gasholders" that overlooks The Oval cricket ground in London. Gasholders were built in the United Kingdom from early Victorian times; many such as Kings Cross in London and St. Marks Street in Kingston upon Hull are so old that they are entirely riveted, as their construction predates the use of welding in construction. The last to be built in the UK was in 1983.

== Owners ==
=== Interstate pipeline companies ===
Interstate pipeline companies rely heavily on underground storage to perform load balancing and system supply management on their long-haul transmission lines. FERC regulations though demand that these companies open up the remainder of their capacity not used for that purpose to third parties. Twenty-five interstate companies currently operate 172 underground natural gas storage facilities. In 2005, their facilities accounted for about 43 percent of overall storage deliverability and 55 percent of working gas capacity in the US. These operators include the Columbia Gas Transmission Company, Dominion Gas Transmission Company, The National Fuel Gas Supply Company, Natural Gas Pipeline of America, Texas Gas Transmission Company, Southern Star Central Pipeline Company, TransCanada Corporation.

=== Intrastate pipeline companies and local distribution companies ===
Intrastate pipeline companies use storage facilities for operational balancing and system supply as well as to meet the energy demand of end-use customers. LDCs generally use gas from storage to serve customers directly. This group operates 148 underground storage sites and account for 40 percent of overall storage deliverability and 32 percent of working gas capacity in the US. These operators include Consumers Energy Company and the Northern Illinois Gas Company (Nicor), in the US and Enbridge and Union Gas in Canada.

=== Independent storage service providers ===
The deregulation activity in the underground gas storage arena has attracted independent storage service providers to develop storage facilities. The capacity made available would then be leased to third-party customers such as marketers and electricity generators. It is expected that in the future, this group would take more market share, as more deregulation takes place. Currently in the US, this group accounts for 18 percent of overall storage deliverability and 13 percent of working gas capacity in the US.

Underground Natural Gas Storage by Type of Owner, 2005.
| Type of Owner | Number of Sites | Working Gas Capacity (10^{9} ft^{3}) | Daily Deliverability (10^{6} ft^{3}) |
|---|---|---|---|
| Interstate Pipeline | 172 | 2,197 | 35,830 |
| Intrastate & LDC | 148 | 1,292 | 33,121 |
| Independent | 74 | 521 | 14,681 |

== Location and distribution ==
=== Europe ===
As of January 2011, there were 124 underground storage facilities in Europe. Gas Infrastructure Europe (GIE) reports 254 existing facilities or planned expansions in its Gas storage database. Most member states have a minimum storage requirement that covers at least 15% of their annual gas consumption. In 2022, the requirement was 80% for 1 November, rising to 90% for 2023 and 2024, and reducing to 83% for 2025.

=== Russia ===
Gazprom uses large seasonal stores, mostly in western Russia, to manage the large variation in domestic and export demands, filling in the summer low demand season and supplying high demand in the winter. Between 2005 and 2021 an average of about 40 billion cubic metres (1.4 trillion cubic feet) of storage was used in this way, peaking at about 60 billion cubic metres (2.1 trillion cubic feet) in 2020/2021.

=== United States ===
The United States is typically broken out into three main regions when it comes to gas consumption and production. These are the consuming East, the consuming West and the producing South.

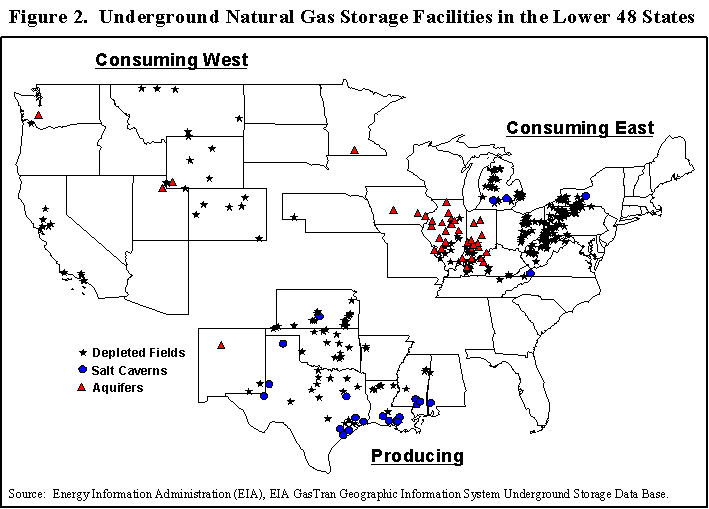
Source.

==== Consuming East ====
The consuming east region, particularly the states in the northern part, heavily rely on stored gas to meet the peak demand during the cold winter months. Due to the prevailing cold winters, large population centers and developed infrastructure, it is not surprising that this region has the highest level of working gas storage capacity of the other regions and the largest number of storage sites, mainly in depleted reservoirs. In addition to underground storage, LNG is increasingly playing a crucial role in providing supplemental backup and/or peaking supply to LDCs on a short term basis. Although the total capacity for these LNG facilities does not match those of underground storage in scale, the short term high deliverability makes up for that.

==== Consuming West ====
The consuming west region has the smallest share of gas storage both in terms of the number of sites as well as gas capacity/deliverability. Storage in this area is mostly used to allow domestic and Albertan gas, coming from Canada, to flow at a rather constant rate. In northern California, Pacific Gas and Electric (PG&E) has underground storage capacity for about 100 billion cubic feet (2.8×10^{9} cubic metres) of gas across three storage facilities. PG&E uses the storage to store gas when it is inexpensive in summer to use in winter when purchased gas is expensive.

==== Producing South ====
The producing south's storage facilities are linked to the market centers and play a crucial role in the efficient export, transmission and distribution of natural gas produced to the consuming regions. These storage facilities allow the storage of gas that is not immediately marketable to be stored for later use.

Underground Natural Gas Storage by Region, 2000
| Region | Number of Sites | Working Gas Capacity (10^{9} ft^{3}) | Daily Deliverability (10^{6} ft^{3}) |
|---|---|---|---|
| East | 280 | 2,045 | 39,643 |
| West | 37 | 628 | 9,795 |
| South | 98 | 1,226 | 28,296 |

=== Canada ===
In Canada, the maximum working gas stored was 456 billion cubic feet (1.29×10^{10} cubic metres) in 2006. Alberta storage accounts for 47.5 percent of the total working gas volume. It is followed by Ontario which accounts for 39.1 percent, British Columbia which accounts for 7.6 percent, Saskatchewan which accounts for 5.1 percent and finally Quebec which accounts for 0.9 percent.

== Regulation and deregulation ==
=== United States ===
Interstate pipeline companies in the US are subject to the jurisdiction of the Federal Energy Regulatory Commission (FERC). Prior to 1992, these companies owned all the gas that flowed through their systems. This also included gas in their storage facility, over which they had complete control. Then FERC Order 636 was implemented. This required the companies to operate their facilities, including gas storage on an open access basis. For gas storage, this meant that these companies could only reserve the capacity needed to maintain system integrity. The rest of the capacity would be available for leasing to third parties on a nondiscriminatory basis. Open access has opened a wide variety of application for gas storage, particularly for marketers which can now exploit price arbitrage opportunities. Any storage capacity would be priced at cost-based pricing, unless the provider can demonstrate to FERC that it lacks market power, in which case it may be allowed to price at market-based rates to gain market share. FERC defines market power as "..the ability of a seller profitably to maintain prices above competitive levels for a significant period of time".

The underlying pricing structure for storage has discouraged development in the gas storage sector, which has not seen many new storage facilities constructed, besides current ones being expanded. In 2005, FERC announced a new Order 678 targeted particularly to gas storage. This rule is intended to stimulate the development of new gas storage facility in the ultimate goal of reducing natural gas price volatility. Commission Chairman Joseph T. Kelliher observed: "Since 1988, natural gas demand in the United States has risen 24 percent. Over the same period, gas storage capacity has increased only 1.4 percent. While construction of storage capacity has lagged behind the demand for natural gas, we have seen record levels of price volatility. This suggests that current storage capacity is inadequate. Further, this year, what storage capacity exists may be full far earlier than in any previous year. According to some analysts, that raises the prospect that some domestic gas production may be shut-in. Our final rule should help reduce price volatility and expand storage capacity."

This ruling aims at opening up two approaches for developers of natural gas storage, to be able to charge market-based rates. The first one is the redefinition of the relevant product market for storage that includes alternatives for storage such as available pipeline capacity, local gas production and LNG terminals. The second approach aims at implementing section 312 of the Energy Policy Act. It would allow an applicant to request authority to charge "market-based rates even if a lack of market power has not been demonstrated, in circumstances where market-based rates are in the public interest and necessary to encourage the construction of storage capacity in the area needing storage service and that customers are adequately protected," the Commission said. It is expected that this new order will entice developers, especially independent storage operators, to develop new facilities in the near future.

=== Canada ===
In Alberta, gas storage rates are not regulated and providers negotiate rates with their customers on a contract-by-contract basis. However the Carbon facility which is owned by ATCO gas is regulated, since ATCO is a utility company. Therefore, ATCO Gas has to charge cost-based rates for its customers, and can market any additional capacities at market-based rates. In Ontario, gas storage is regulated by the Ontario Energy Board. Currently all the available storage is owned by vertically integrated utilities. The utility companies have to price their storage capacity sold to their customers at cost-based rates, but can market any remaining capacity at market-based rates. Storage developed by independent storage developers can charge market-based rates. In British Columbia, gas storage is not regulated. All available storage capacity is marketed at market-based rates.

=== United Kingdom ===
The regulation of gas storage, transportation and sale is overseen by Ofgem (a government regulator). This has been the case since the gas industry was privatised in 1986. Most forms of gas storage were owned by Transco (now part of National Grid plc), however the national network has now largely been broken down into regional networks, owned by different companies, they are however all still answerable to Ofgem.

== Storage economics ==
=== Storage development cost ===
As with all infrastructural investments in the energy sector, developing storage facilities is capital-intensive. Investors usually use the return on investment as a financial measure for the viability of such projects. It has been estimated that investors require a rate or return between 12 percent to 15 percent for regulated projects, and close to 20 percent for unregulated projects. The higher expected return from unregulated projects is due to the higher perceived market risk. In addition significant expenses are accumulated during the planning and location of potential storage sites to determine its suitability, which further increases the risk.

The capital expenditure to build the facility mostly depends on the physical characteristics of the reservoir. First of all, the development cost of a storage facility largely depends on the type of the storage field. As a general rule of thumb, salt caverns are the most expensive to develop on a volume of Working Gas Capacity Basis. However one should keep in mind that because the gas in such facilities can be cycled repeatedly, on a Deliverability basis, they may be less costly. A Salt Cavern facility might cost anywhere from $10 million to $25 million per billion cubic feet (10^{9} ft^{3}) of working gas capacity. The wide price range is because of region difference which dictates the geological requirements. These factors include the amount of compressive horsepower required, the type of surface and the quality of the geologic structure to name a few. A depleted reservoir costs between $5 million to $6 million per billion cubic feet of Working Gas Capacity. Finally another major cost incurred when building new storage facilities is that of base gas. The amount of base gas in a reservoir could be as high as 80% for aquifers making them very unattractive to develop when gas prices are high. On the other hand, salt caverns require the least amount of base gas. The high cost of base gas is what drives the expansion of current sites vs the development of new ones. This is because expansions require little addition to base gas.

The expected cash flows from such projects depend on a number of factors. These include the services the facility provides as well as the regulatory regime under which it operates. Facilities that operate primarily to take advantage of commodity arbitrage opportunities are expected to have different cash flow benefits than ones primarily used to ensure seasonal supply reliability. Rules set by regulators can on one hand restrict the profit made by storage facility owners or on the other hand guarantee profit, depending on the market model.

=== Storage valuation ===
To understand the economics of gas storage, it is crucial to be able to value it. Several approaches have been proposed. They include:

- Cost-of-service valuation
- Least-cost planning
- Seasonal valuation
- Option-based valuation

The different valuation modes co-exist in the real world and are not mutually exclusive. Buyers and sellers typically use a combination of the different prices to come up with the true value of storage. An example of the different valuations and the price they generate can be found in the table below.

Cost of storage per valuation mode.
| Type | Dollars/mcf of working gas |
|---|---|
| Median cost-of-service | $0.64 |
| Intrinsic value for Winter 05/06 as of August 2004 | $0.47-$0.62 |
| Least cost planning (depleted reservoir) | $0.70-$1.10 |
| Hypothetical cost-of-service of salt cavern | $2.93 |
| Intrinsic and extrinsic value of salt cavern (depleted reservoir) | $1.60-$1.90 |

==== Cost-of-service valuation ====
This valuation mode is typically used to value regulated storage, for instance storage operated by interstate pipeline companies. These companies are regulated by FERC. This pricing method allows the developers to recover their cost and an agreed upon return on investment. The regulatory body requires that the rates and tariffs are maintained and publicly published. The services provided by these companies include firm and interruptible storage as well as no-notice storage services. Usually, cost of service pricing is used for depleted reservoir facilities. If it is used to price, say salt cavern formations, the cost would be very high, due to the high cost of development of such facilities.

==== Least-cost planning ====
This valuation mode is typically used by local distribution companies (LDCs). It is based on pricing storage, according to the savings resulting from not having to resort to other more expensive options. This pricing mode depends on the consumer and their respective load profile/shape.

==== Seasonal valuation ====
The seasonal valuation of storage is also referred to as the intrinsic value. It is evaluated as the difference between the two prices in a pair of forward prices. The idea being that one can lock-in a forward spread, either physically or financially. For developers seeking to study the feasibility of building a storage facility, they would typically look at the long-term price spreads.

==== Option-based valuation ====
In addition to possessing an intrinsic value, storage may also have extrinsic value. Intrinsic valuation of storage does not take the cycling ability of high-deliverability storage. The extrinsic valuation reflects the fact that in such facilities, say salt cavern formations, a proportion of the space can be used more than once, thus increasing value. Such high-deliverability storage facility allows its user to respond to variations in demand/price within a season or during a given day rather than just seasonal variations as was the case with single cycle facilities.

=== Effects of natural gas prices on storage ===
In general as we see in the graph below, high gas prices are typically associated to low storage periods. Usually when prices are high during the early months of the refill season (April–October), many users of storage adopt a wait and see attitude. They limit their gas intake in anticipation that the prices will drop before the heating season begins (November–March). However, when that decrease does not occur, they are forced to buy natural gas at high prices. This is particularly true for Local Distribution and other operators who rely on storage to meet the seasonal demand for their customers. On the other hand, other storage users, who use storage as a marketing tool (hedging or speculating) will hold off storing a lot of gas when the prices are high.

== Future of storage technology ==
Research is being conducted on many fronts in the gas storage field to help identify new improved and more economical ways to store gas. Research being conducted by the US Department of Energy is showing that salt formations can be chilled allowing for more gas to be stored. This will reduce the size of the formation needed to be treated, and have salt extracted from it. This will lead to cheaper development costs for salt formation storage facility type0.

Another aspect being looked at, are other formations that may hold gas. These include hard rock formations such as granite, in areas where such formations exists and other types currently used for gas storage do not. In Sweden a new type of storage facility has been built, called "lined rock cavern". This storage facility consists of installing a steel tank in a cavern in the rock of a hill and surrounding it with concrete. Although the development cost of such facility is quite expensive, its ability to cycle gas multiple times compensates for it, similar to salt formation facilities. Finally, another research project sponsored by the Department of Energy, is that of hydrates. Hydrates are compounds formed when natural gas is frozen in the presence of water. The advantage being that as much as 181 standard cubic feet of natural gas could be stored in a single cubic foot of hydrate.

== See also ==
- Natural gas prices
- Natural gas processing
- Carbon dioxide (CO_{2})
- Compressed natural gas (CNG)
- Fuel station
- Future energy development
- Hydrogen storage
- List of North American natural gas pipelines
- Underground hydrogen storage
- Steam reforming
- Strategic natural gas reserve
- World energy consumption
