= Jon Wellinghoff =

American government official (born 1949)

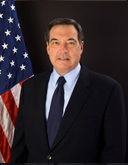

Chairman of the Federal Energy Regulatory Commission
- In office January 23, 2009 – November 25, 2013; Acting: January 23, 2009 – March 19, 2009
- President: Barack Obama
- Preceded by: Joseph T. Kelliher
- Succeeded by: Cheryl LaFleur

Personal details
- Born: Jon B. Wellinghoff; May 30, 1949 (age 77) Santa Monica, California, U.S.
- Spouse: Karen Galatz
- Relations: 4 children, 3 grandchildren
- Education: University of Nevada, Reno; Howard University; Antioch School of Law

Jon B. Wellinghoff (born May 30, 1949) is an American attorney who served as the chairman of the Federal Energy Regulatory Commission (FERC) from 2009 to 2013. The FERC is a U.S. government agency that regulates the interstate transmission of electricity, natural gas, and oil. The FERC also reviews proposals to build liquefied natural gas (LNG) terminals and interstate natural gas pipelines and licenses hydropower projects.

Wellinghoff's work in energy-related fields has included renewable integration, plug-in electric vehicles, and the modernization of the American electric grid. In November 2013, Wellinghoff stepped down from his post as the 13th FERC chairman.

== Early life and education ==
Wellinghoff was born in Santa Monica, California, on May 30, 1949, and moved to Reno, Nevada, at the age of four. He attended the University of Nevada-Reno, earning a B.S. in mathematics in 1971. The following year he earned a master's degree in teaching mathematics from Howard University and stayed in Washington, D.C., to attend Antioch School of Law where he earned his J.D. in 1975.

Wellinghoff returned to Nevada where he would specialize in energy law for more than 30 years. In private practice, he focused exclusively on cases pertaining to renewable energy and energy efficiency, causes he continued to promote as FERC Chairman. He was the primary author of Nevada's Renewable Portfolio Standard (RPS), one of two state RPS programs to receive an "A" rating from the Union of Concerned Scientists.

Wellinghoff has also held a variety of positions in the public sector, providing legal counsel on energy issues to, among others, the U.S. Senate Commerce Committee, the Federal Trade Commission and the Nevada Public Utility Commission.

Consumer protection was another hallmark of Wellinghoff's career prior to joining FERC. In his hometown of Reno, he held the position of Deputy District Attorney in the Washoe County District Attorney's Consumer Fraud division. His work on behalf of consumers helped make him Nevada's first Consumer Advocate for customers of public utilities. In that role, he argued for the public in cases before FERC, the Nevada Supreme Court and what is now the Nevada Public Utility Commission.

== Career ==
=== FERC commissioner ===
In 2006, Wellinghoff was appointed by President George W. Bush and confirmed by the Senate as one of the five commissioners at the FERC.

As commissioner, Wellinghoff was influential in moving FERC towards prioritizing the removal of barriers to integration of renewable energy into the electric grid. He has been an advocate of "demand response" and "smart grid" technologies that will facilitate coordination and communication between electricity consumers and providers, allowing consumers to have greater control over their energy usage and the associated costs.

Wellinghoff was an early proponent of improving energy infrastructure to accommodate future demands from automobiles powered primarily by electricity. He coined the phrase "Cashback Car" in a contribution to the Brookings Institution publication, "Plug-In Electric Vehicles: What Role for Washington?" In it, he envisioned a future where drivers not only save money by switching from gasoline but are paid by utilities for use of their batteries to provide and store electricity. Wellinghoff explained that while the necessary technology already exists, improvements to infrastructure will be needed to make the "Cashback Car" a reality.

In 2008, the Alliance to Save Energy honored Wellinghoff with its prestigious Charles Percy Award for Public Service. The non-profit group bestowed the award "in recognition of [his] decades of outstanding public service and his expertise and leadership on energy efficiency as the nation confronts the dual challenge of electricity supply security climate change."

During his time as commissioner, Wellinghoff also received the EnerNoc Thought Leadership Award at a summit on energy efficiency and the Award for Leadership in Demand Response from the U.S. Demand Response Coordinating Committee.

=== FERC chairman ===
On March 19, 2009, President Barack Obama named Wellinghoff as FERC Chairman. Wellinghoff quickly established three top priorities for his term: the integration of renewable energy sources, including wind, solar geothermal and hydrokinetic energy, into the electric grid; the implementation of advanced technologies aimed at making the use and distribution of energy more efficient; and the promotion of demand-side energy practices, including real-time electricity pricing and the use of electric cars. All three of these priorities will emphasize improvements to the overall efficiency of the nation's energy infrastructure.

Wellinghoff has vowed to pursue his priorities through the implementation of regulatory practices that ensure a fair and competitive energy market, pointing out that it is through competitive energy markets that consumers will reap the full benefits of new technology.

To promote policies that will increase renewable energy and improve energy efficiency, Wellinghoff created a new office within the Commission: the Office of Energy Policy and Innovation. The office is tasked with providing leadership in the development and formulation of policies and regulations to address emerging issues affecting wholesale and interstate energy markets.

The potential of renewable energy resources to expand our energy supply while decreasing adverse environmental impact has been an interest of Wellinghoff throughout his career. Obstacles remain, however, to the full utilization of wind, solar, geothermal, and hydrokinetic energy. While these resources provide a growing share of America's energy, they remain hampered by their often remote proximity to major population centers and other impediments. Wellinghoff has made the integration of these resources into the energy market a key aspect of his agenda.

Renewable integration will also be facilitated by another of the Wellinghoff's priorities, the development and implementation of advanced broadband and digital technologies collectively referred to as "smart grid." This push to modernize the nation's energy infrastructure will allow consumers and providers to make more informed decisions about how they use electricity. Problems stemming from the variable nature of some renewable energy technologies would be reduced if grid operators could easily rely on alternatives when encountering high demand or unfavorable natural conditions.

On July 16, 2009, the Commission released a Smart Grid Policy Statement setting priorities for the adoption of new standards and practices that will best enable FERC to facilitate the widespread and expedited use of smart grid technology.

A major component of an effective smart grid will be improved demand response capabilities, the third of Wellinghoff's top priorities. Wellinghoff has labeled demand response the "killer app" for the smart grid. This form of enhanced, two-way communication would allow electricity providers to pay consumers to use less electricity. At times of peak demand (and peak prices) and other times of grid stress or need, consumers could respond by modifying their usage. Grid operators could, in turn, respond with more efficient management of available resources and avoid the high expenses associated with putting another power plant on-line to generate the electricity necessary to meet demand. Less wasted electricity would help lower prices for everyone and foster a more efficient and environmentally sustainable market. FERC's most recent assessment of the country's demand response potential concluded that peak demand could be reduced by as much 188 GW, or roughly 20%, by 2019.

Wellinghoff has worked to create a receptive environment for new and emerging energy technologies such as hydrokinetic energy. Under his leadership, the Commission has continued to collaborate with the Department of the Interior to incubate the growth of this technology. This partnership will facilitate the development of offshore hydrokinetic projects as well as wind and solar projects. Similarly, the Commission has signed agreements with states such as Maine and Washington that will help fast-track new projects while ensuring that associated environmental concerns are given careful agreement.

Under Wellinghoff's leadership the Commission issued FERC Order 745 on March 15, 2011, which prescribes how providers of demand response are to be compensated in the organized wholesale markets. On January 25, 2016, the Supreme Court upheld FERC 745, overruling the US Court of Appeals decision. The Court affirmed that the FERC had jurisdiction over prices paid for wholesale demand response.

Jon Wellinghoff submitted his resignation to U.S. President Barack Obama on May 5, 2013, and remained in the post until November 25, 2013, when the president appointed his successor, Cheryl A. LaFleur.

For his work with the Energy Storage Community he received the Energy Storage Association's 2014 Phil Symons Award at their 24th Annual Conference.

=== Stoel Rives LLP ===
Wellinghoff joined Stoel Rives LLP after leaving FERC in 2013. His work there focused on assisting emerging energy technology firms (battery manufacturers, solar PV system developers and manufacturers, demand response providers, and advanced grid technology providers to name a few) with strategies and counsel as to growing their businesses and avoiding and/or removing barriers to market success. He also participated in numerous speaking engagements and keynote presentations for energy technology firms, trade associations and energy sector organizations. Topics included a look at our energy future, grid security, the rise of solar energy and distributed generation, the German energy experience, and advances in energy technology.

Bloomberg at the time quoted him as saying, “If battery costs fall far enough compared with gas, then wind and solar could become the preferred source of ‘peaking’ power that’s needed when electricity demand is at its highest.”

Battery storage devices have fallen a lot in the last decade. According to Bloomberg New Energy Finance, the cost of lithium-ion battery storage has dropped by roughly 80 percent-85 percent. Going back to 2010, the drop is an even more staggering 90 percent-93 percent.

=== SolarCity ===
Wellinghoff served as SolarCity's Chief Policy Officer from April 2016 through April 2017. Here he was responsible for recommending policy initiatives and interventions in state, federal, and other forums to support distributed energy resource products and services offered by SolarCity.

=== Grid Policy Consulting ===
In April 2017, Jon opened GridPolicy, Inc. where as the CEO, he works to enable the intersection of policy and distributed energy technologies. GridPolicy assists energy tech companies from start-ups to fully commercialized enterprises to get to market and expand markets by addressing critical policy barriers to business success.

== Personal life ==
Wellinghoff is married to Karen Galatz and he has four children, Andrea, Sarah, Jules, and Jacob, and three grandchildren.

== Bibliography ==
- Wellinghoff, Jon; Sandalow, David (2009). "The Cashback Car" (PDF). Plug-In Vehicles: What Role for Washington?. Washington, D.C.: Brookings Institution. pp. 65–85. Archived from the original (PDF) on June 16, 2009.
- Wellinghoff, Jon; Morenoff, David (November 2007). "Recognizing the Importance of Demand Response: The Second Half of the Wholesale Electric Market Equation" (PDF). Energy Law Journal. pp. 389–419. Archived from the original (PDF) on May 7, 2009.
- Wellinghoff, Jon; Morenoff, David (November 2008). "Facilitating Hydrokinetic Energy Development through Regulatory Innovation" (PDF). Energy Law Journal. pp. 397–420. Archived from the original (PDF) on July 26, 2011.
- Wellinghoff, Jon; Combs, Jim; Pechman, Carl; Ringo, Marty (September 2003). "Geothermal Development on Military Lands: Development Opportunities Through the Public/Private Partnership Model". United States Navy Geothermal Program Office.
- Wellinghoff, Jon (October 1992). "The System Approach to Commercial Lighting". Southern California Edison Lighting Course Manual.

Political offices
Preceded by Joseph T. Kelliher	Chairperson of the Federal Energy Regulatory Commission; 2009–2013	Incumbent
