= David Rosner (analyst) =

American energy industry analyst

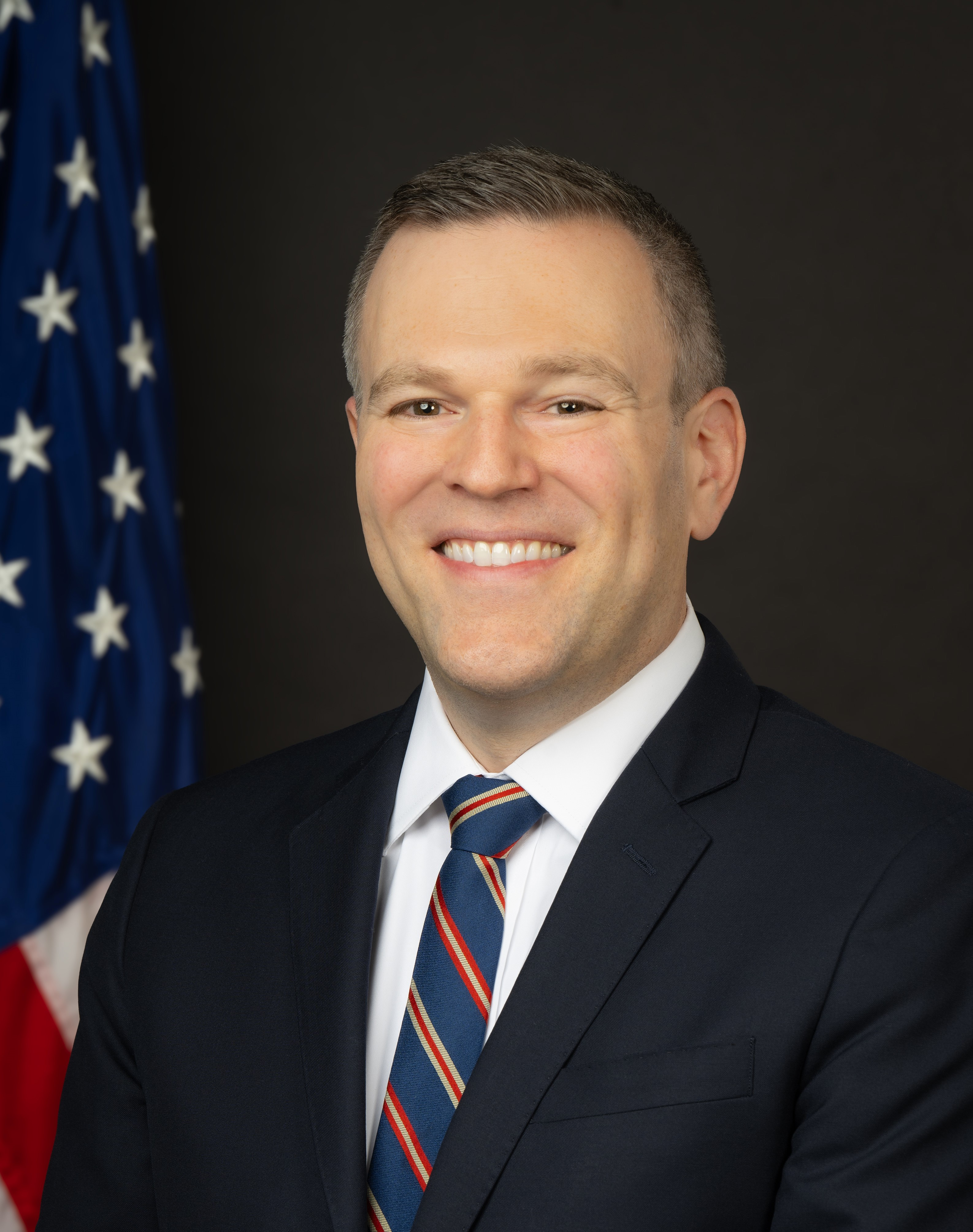
- Official portrait, 2024

Chair of the Federal Energy Regulatory Commission
- In office August 13, 2025 – October 23, 2025
- President: Donald Trump
- Preceded by: Mark Christie
- Succeeded by: Laura Swett

Member of the Federal Energy Regulatory Commission
- Incumbent
- Assumed office June 17, 2024
- President: Joe Biden; Donald Trump
- Preceded by: Richard Glick

Personal details
- Party: Democratic
- Education: Tufts University (BA); American University (MA, MPP)

David Rosner is an American government official who has been a member of the Federal Energy Regulatory Commission (FERC) since 2024. He previously served as an energy industry analyst for FERC, detailed to the Democratic staff of the United States Senate Committee on Energy and Natural Resources.

Rosner was named chair of FERC after the departure of Mark Christie in August 2025.
