= Laura Swett =

American lawyer and government official

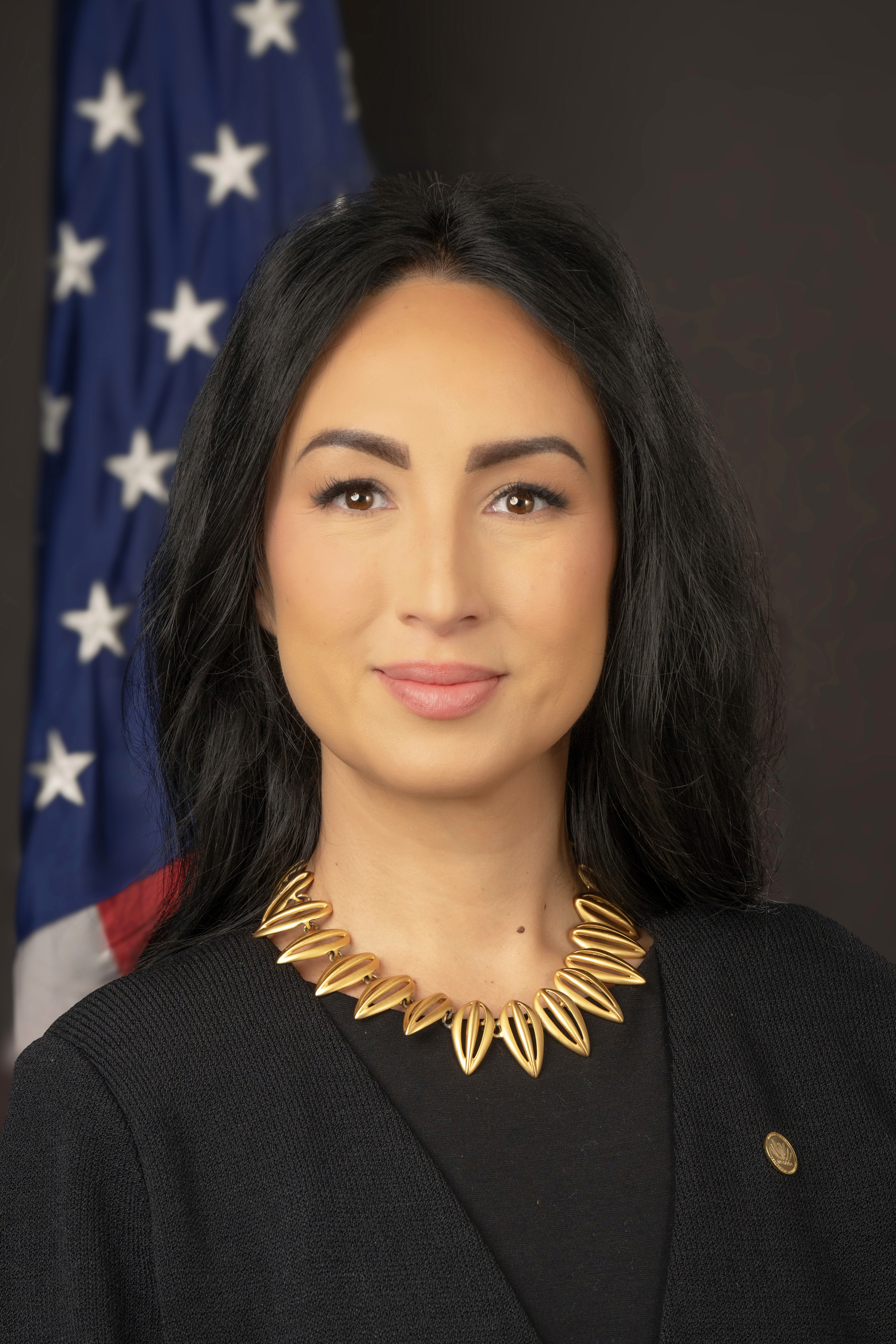
- Official portrait, 2025

Chair of the Federal Energy Regulatory Commission
- Incumbent
- Assumed office October 23, 2025
- President: Donald Trump
- Preceded by: David Rosner

Member of the Federal Energy Regulatory Commission
- Incumbent
- Assumed office October 20, 2025
- President: Donald Trump
- Preceded by: Mark Christie

Personal details
- Born: Laura Victoria Swett
- Party: Republican
- Education: University of Virginia (BA); Georgetown University (JD)

Laura Victoria Swett is an American lawyer and government official who has been a member of the Federal Energy Regulatory Commission (FERC) since 2025. She was appointed chair of the commission by President Donald Trump shortly after being confirmed as a commissioner. She was previously employed as an advisor and lawyer for FERC and as an energy litigator for Vinson & Elkins.
