= Willie L. Phillips =

American government employee

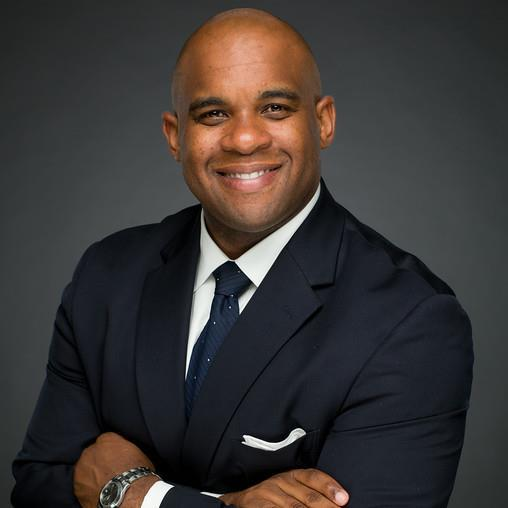

Chair of the Federal Energy Regulatory Commission
- In office January 3, 2023 – January 20, 2025; Acting: January 3, 2023 – February 9, 2024
- President: Joe Biden
- Preceded by: Richard Glick
- Succeeded by: Mark Christie

Member of the Federal Energy Regulatory Commission
- In office December 3, 2021 – April 22, 2025
- President: Joe Biden; Donald Trump
- Preceded by: Neil Chatterjee
- Succeeded by: David LaCerte

Personal details
- Party: Democratic
- Education: University of Montevallo (BA); Howard University (JD)

Willie Lee Phillips Jr. is an American attorney who served as the chairman of the Federal Energy Regulatory Commission (FERC) from 2023 to 2025.

== Career ==
Phillips is originally from Fairhope, Alabama, and attended the University of Montevallo.

Phillips was assistant general counsel for the North American Electric Reliability Corporation. He previously worked in private practice in energy policy.

In 2014 he was appointed to the District of Columbia Public Service Commission. Mayor Muriel Bowser appointed him chairman in 2018. At the DCPSC, Phillips approved the merger of Exelon and Pepco in 2016, which was challenged by D.C. Attorney General Karl Racine but upheld by the courts. Phillips had rejected a previous version of the merger proposal the year before.

=== FERC ===
President Joe Biden appointed Phillips to the Federal Energy Regulatory Commission in September 2021 and he was confirmed unanimously by the Senate on November 16, taking office on December 3, 2021. Phillips sees himself as a consensus-builder.

After the expiration of Commissioner Richard Glick's term as chairman, Biden named Phillips acting chairman of the commission. He is the first Black person to be serve as chair. In July 2023, the Congressional Black Caucus wrote to President Biden to make Phillips the permanent chairman, but the White House stated he was still the acting chairman, pending confirmation of a new chair, though observers state there is no difference. On February 9, 2024, Biden officially designated Phillips as chair.

Since Phillips became chair, the commission has approved multiple natural gas projects and pipelines, resulting in criticism from environmental advocates.

One of Phillips's priorities at the agency was to accelerate power plant interconnection and transmission planning. In July 2023, it approved a rule directing how grid operators study proposed projects, which Phillips called "historic." Phillips has also emphasized grid reliability during his term: in May 2024, FERC approved a rule regarding interstate electricity transmission and cost-sharing of large projects.

Phillips resigned from the commission in April 2025 following a request from the Trump administration.
