= Nora Brownell =

American businesswoman

- Born: Erie, Pennsylvania
- Education: Syracuse University
- Known for: Former Commissioner for the Federal Energy Regulatory Commission

Nora Mead Brownell (born May 1947) is the co-founder of Espy Energy Solutions, LLC, an energy consulting firm and a former Commissioner of the Federal Energy Regulatory Commission (FERC) from 2001–2006 under the administration of President George W. Bush. She is a former President of the National Association of Regulatory Utility Commissioners (NARUC).

== Early life and education ==
Brownell is a native of Erie, Pennsylvania and attended Syracuse University.

== Career ==
In 1987, Brownell served as the Deputy Executive Assistant to Pennsylvania Governor Richard Thornburgh. Her career in energy began when she served as a Commissioner of the Pennsylvania Public Utility Commission (PUC) from 1997 to 2001.

On April 30, 2001 President George W. Bush nominated Brownell to serve as a Commissioner for the Federal Energy Regulatory Commission. Her nomination was confirmed by the United States Senate a month later on May 25. She served until July 21, 2006. Following the conclusion of her term as a Commissioner with FERC, Brownell helped found the energy consulting firm, ESPY Energy Solutions, based in Alexandria, Virginia.

She served as the Board Chair for Pacific Gas and Electric. She has been a Board Member for many corporations including National Grid, Spectra Energy, Oncor Electric Delivery, and Times Publishing Company. In addition, she has lectured at the University of Vermont Law School, Michigan State University, and the University of Idaho.
