= Kevin J. McIntyre =

American lawyer (1960–2019)

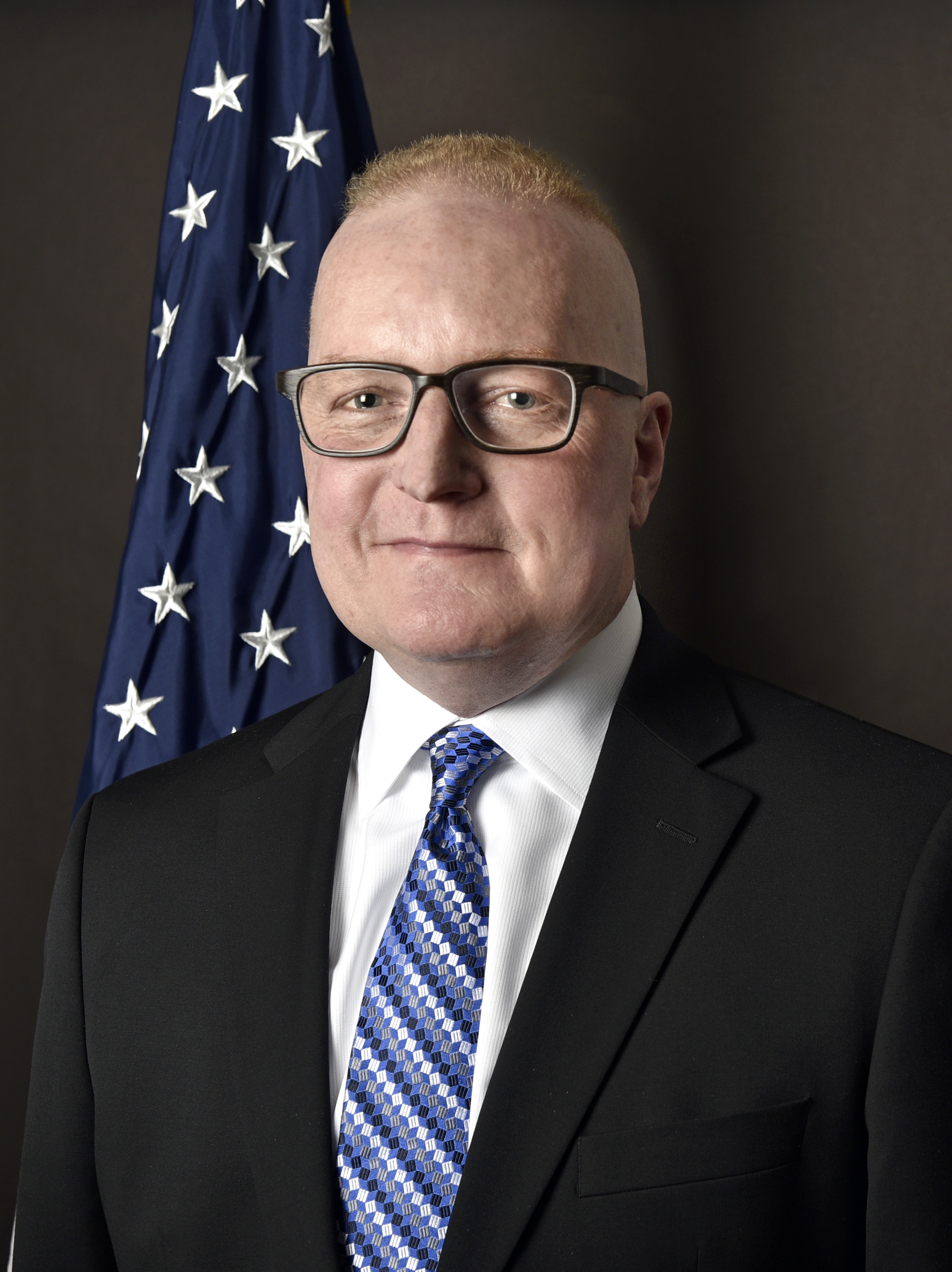

Chairman of the Federal Energy Regulatory Commission
- In office December 7, 2017 – October 22, 2018
- President: Donald Trump
- Preceded by: Neil Chatterjee
- Succeeded by: Neil Chatterjee

Member of the Federal Energy Regulatory Commission
- In office December 7, 2017 – January 2, 2019
- President: Donald Trump
- Preceded by: Norman Bay
- Succeeded by: James Danly

Personal details
- Born: Kevin Joseph McIntyre; December 27, 1960 Dover Air Force Base, Delaware, U.S.
- Died: January 2, 2019 (aged 58) Arlington, Virginia, U.S.
- Party: Republican
- Spouse: Jennifer
- Children: 3
- Education: San Diego State University; Georgetown Law School

Kevin Joseph McIntyre (December 27, 1960 – January 2, 2019) was an American attorney and government official who served as a member and Chairman of the Federal Energy Regulatory Commission (FERC). Prior to his role at FERC, he was co-leader of the global energy practice at the law firm Jones Day. At Jones Day, McIntyre's legal practice focused on compliance and enforcement, energy trading, competition issues, and energy exports.

== Early life ==
Born at Dover Air Force Base in Delaware, he was educated at San Diego State University and at Georgetown Law School.

McIntyre died on January 2, 2019, from brain cancer at his home in Arlington, Virginia, aged 58.
