= Mark Christie =

American attorney

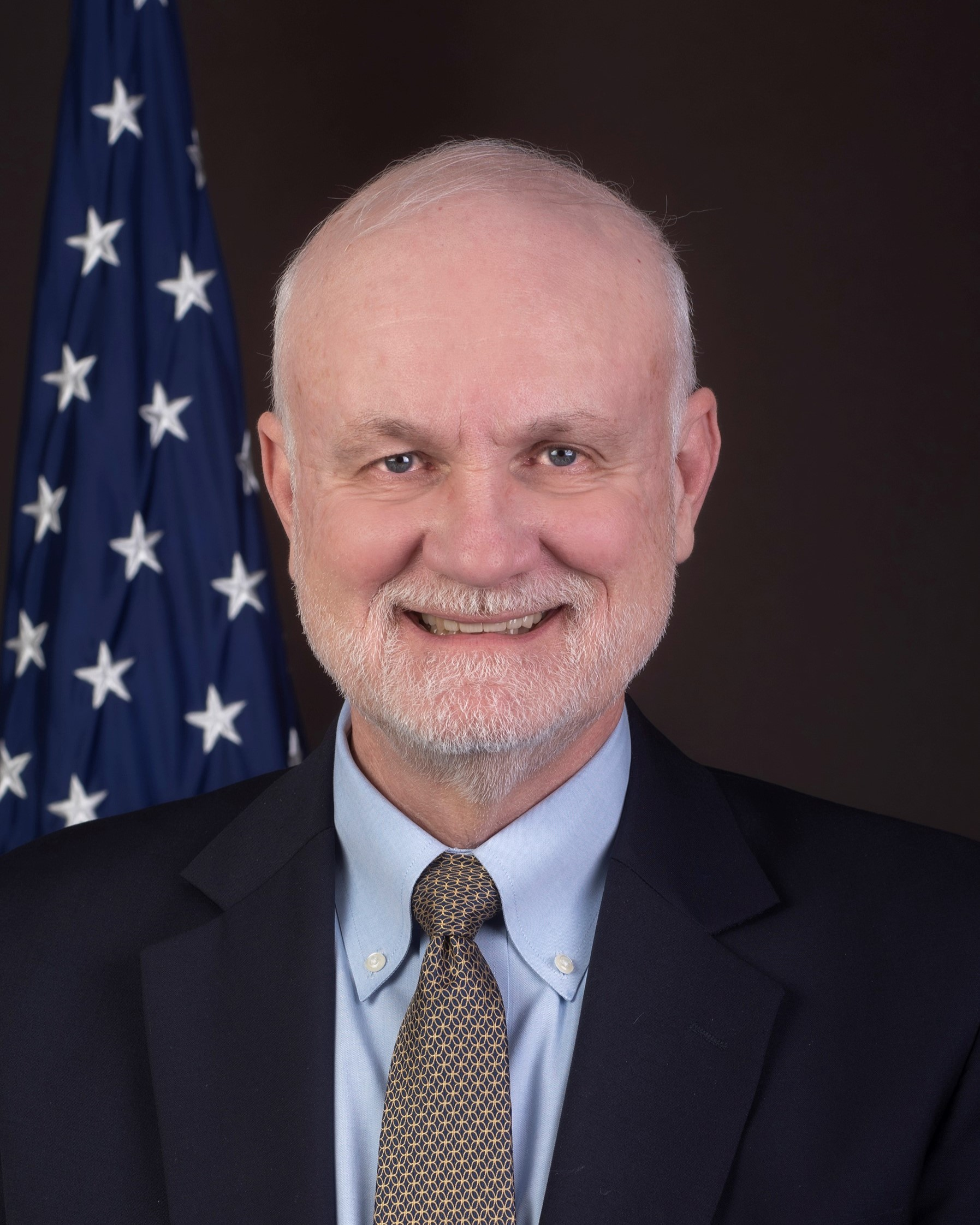
- Official portrait, 2023

Chair of the Federal Energy Regulatory Commission
- In office January 20, 2025 – August 8, 2025
- President: Donald Trump
- Preceded by: Willie L. Phillips
- Succeeded by: David Rosner

Member of the Federal Energy Regulatory Commission
- In office January 4, 2021 – August 8, 2025
- President: Donald Trump; Joe Biden; Donald Trump
- Preceded by: Bernard L. McNamee
- Succeeded by: Laura Swett

Personal details
- Born: Mark Curtis Christie; August 8, 1953 (age 72) Bluefield, West Virginia, U.S.
- Party: Republican
- Education: Wake Forest University (BA); Georgetown University (JD)

Military service
- Branch/service: United States Marine Corps
- Rank: Major

Mark Curtis Christie (born August 8, 1953) is an American attorney who has served as a Republican member of the Federal Energy Regulatory Commission since 2021. He was previously a judge of the Virginia State Corporation Commission, counsel to Virginia House Speaker William J. Howell, and counsel to Virginia Governor George Allen.

Christie had been a counsel to the Governor of Virginia during George Allen's term from 1996 to 1998 and a member of the Virginia State Corporation Commission from 2004 to 2021.
