= Robert Powelson =

American lawyer

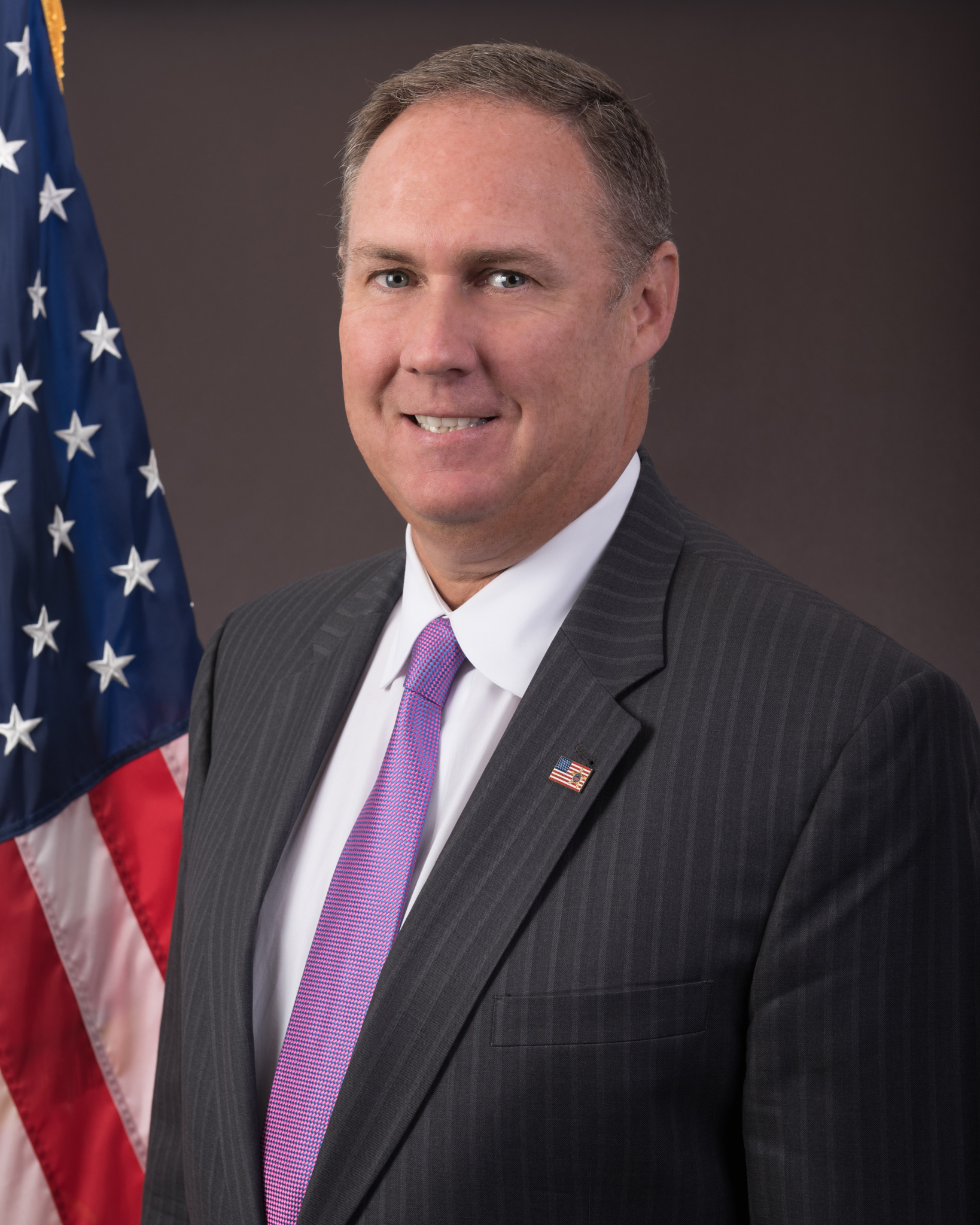

Commissioner of the Federal Energy Regulatory Commission
- In office August 10, 2017 – July 1, 2018
- President: Donald Trump
- Preceded by: Philip D. Moeller
- Succeeded by: Bernard McNamee

Member of the Pennsylvania Public Utility Commission
- In office 2008–2017

Personal details
- Party: Republican
- Education: Saint Joseph's University; University of Pennsylvania

Robert F. Powelson is an American nonprofit executive and former government official who currently serves as president and CEO of the National Association of Water Companies. He was a member of the Federal Energy Regulatory Commission from 2017 until 2018. Powelson previously served as a commissioner on the Pennsylvania Public Utility Commission from 2008 until 2017, and he is a past president of the National Association of Regulatory Utility Commissioners.

Powelson was previously president of the Chester County Chamber of Business and Industry. He has served on the board of directors of the Electric Power Research Institute and Drexel University.

== Federal Energy Regulatory Commission ==
In May 2017, Powelson was nominated by President Donald Trump to become a member of the Federal Energy Regulatory Commission.

At his confirmation hearing, Powelson said he would work to address delays in the approval of natural gas pipelines and spoke favorably about liquefied natural gas exports.

He was confirmed by voice vote on August 3, 2017.

On June 28, 2018, he announced that he was resigning from FERC to become president and CEO of the National Association of Water Companies.
