= Joseph T. Kelliher =

American energy executive (born 1961)

Joseph Timothy Kelliher
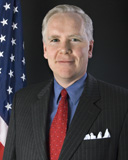
- Official portrait, 2005

Chairman of the Federal Energy Regulatory Commission
- In office July 9, 2005 – January 23, 2009
- President: George W. Bush
- Preceded by: Patrick H. Wood III
- Succeeded by: Jon Wellinghoff

Personal details
- Born: January 17, 1961 (age 65)
- Education: Georgetown University (B.S., 1983); American University, Washington College of Law (J.D., 1994)
- Occupation: Energy executive, attorney
- Known for: Leading FERC during major regulatory reforms

Joseph Timothy Kelliher (born January 17, 1961) is an American energy executive and former chairman of the Federal Energy Regulatory Commission (FERC).

== Education ==
Kelliher received his bachelor's degree from Georgetown University's School of Foreign Service in 1983. In 1994 he graduated with a Juris Doctor, magna cum laude, from Washington College of Law at American University.

== Career ==
Kelliher worked in a private law firm and then on the staff of U.S. Representative Joe Barton, a Republican from Texas. He served as legislative programs director for the American Nuclear Energy Council and represented Public Service Electric and Gas Company (PSEG) until 1995.

In 1995 he went to work for the U.S. House Committee on Commerce as Republican (majority) counsel for electricity, nuclear waste, hydropower, and energy conservation matters, as well as oversight of the U.S. Department of Energy (DOE) and FERC. In that capacity he managed a number of bills that became law. In 1998 Kelliher drafted the first comprehensive electricity legislation that eventually became the electricity provisions of the Energy Policy Act of 2005.

After leaving the Hill in 2000, he briefly reentered the private practice of law, and also served on the Bush/Cheney Presidential Transition Team in late 2000 and early 2001. Kelliher then went to work for DOE where he served as a senior policy advisor to the Secretary of Energy on electricity and other domestic energy issues, including doing staff work for the National Energy Policy Development Group, commonly known as the Cheney Energy Task Force. He played an important role in developing the federal response to the California and Western Power Crisis of 2000-2001. Kelliher also was a principal drafter of the Bush Administration's National Energy Strategy, which guided federal policy from 2001 to 2009.

Kelliher's nomination to FERC was announced by President George W. Bush in October 2001, but he did not receive his hearing in front of the Senate committee until 2003. Kelliher was ultimately confirmed by unanimous voice vote of the Senate and took office on November 20, 2003. On July 9, 2005 he was appointed chairman, replacing Patrick H. Wood III. As Chairman, Kelliher worked to combat market manipulation and price volatility. He created two new divisions at FERC, the Office of Enforcement, to investigate violations of FERC requirements, especially as regard to market manipulation, and the Office of Electric Reliability to review and improve the grid's reliability standards. Under Kelliher's leadership, FERC launched a number of major market manipulation investigations, some of which resulted in significant civil penalties. The nation's first mandatory electric reliability standards were established during his tenure. Kelliher was responsible for efficient implementation of the Energy Policy Act of 2005, the largest grant of regulatory power to FERC since the New Deal in the 1930s. He left FERC in March 2009 to become Executive Vice President for Federal Regulatory Affairs for NextEra Energy, Inc. (FPL Group).

Kelliher was responsible for developing and executing FERC regulatory strategy for NextEra Energy, the largest electricity company in the U.S., one of the few national electricity companies, operating in every region and every organized market, and the most complex company regulated by FERC, with multiple business lines regulated by FERC. Kelliher left NextEra Energy in October 2020.
