= Richard Glick =

American government official

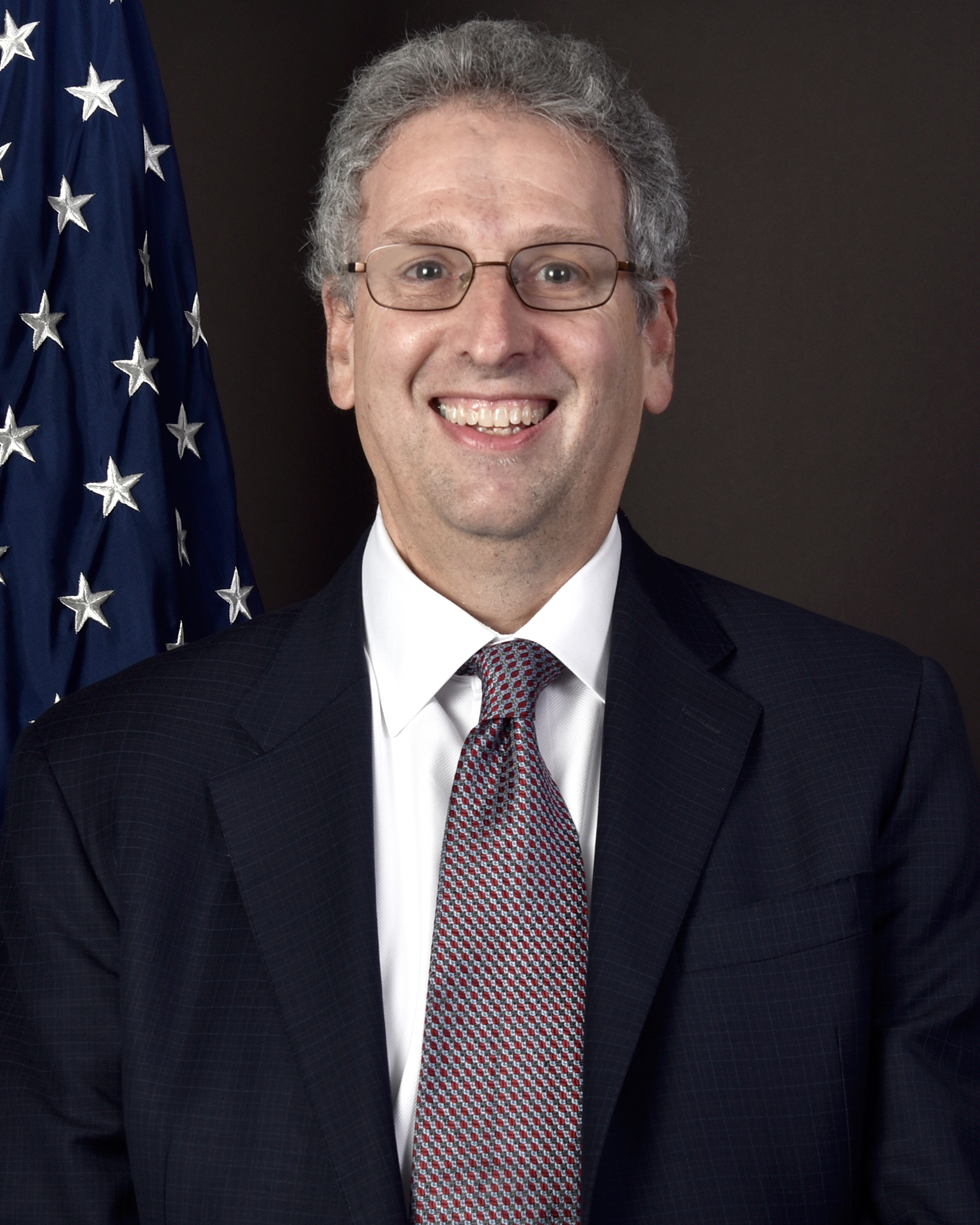

Chair of the Federal Energy Regulatory Commission
- In office January 21, 2021 – January 3, 2023
- President: Joe Biden
- Preceded by: James Danly
- Succeeded by: Willie L. Phillips

Member of the Federal Energy Regulatory Commission
- In office November 29, 2017 – January 3, 2023
- President: Donald Trump; Joe Biden
- Preceded by: Colette Honorable
- Succeeded by: David Rosner

Personal details
- Political party: Democratic
- Education: George Washington University (BA); Georgetown University (JD)

Richard Glick is an American political aide and government official who served as Chairman of the Federal Energy Regulatory Commission (FERC) from January 2021 to January 2023.

== Career ==
Glick previously served as general counsel for Democrats on the United States Senate Committee on Energy and Natural Resources. Glick was also the head lobbyist for energy firm Avangrid. He worked as an adviser to Bill Richardson when Richardson was serving as United States Secretary of Energy during Bill Clinton's presidency.

On January 21, 2021, he was named chairman of the Federal Energy Regulatory Commission by President Joe Biden.

In February 2022, Glick was in a 3-2 majority of FERC commissioners who voted to significantly update the FERC interstate pipeline review policy. The new policy "will take into account a proposed project’s effect on climate change, look at a wider set of impacts on landowners and environmental justice communities, and scrutinize the economic need for a project beyond its contracts with shippers." Glick and his fellow commissioners were called before the Senate Energy and Natural Resources Committee and criticized by Senator Joe Manchin for the incoming policy change.

President Biden appointed Glick to a second term as FERC chairman, but Senator Manchin refused to hold a confirmation hearing for him, and his term expired at the end of the 117th Congress.
