= Patrick H. Wood =

Texas lawyer and government official (born 1962)

Chairman of the Public Utility Commission of Texas
- In office 1995–2001
- Governor: George W. Bush; Rick Perry
- Preceded by: Judy Walsh
- Succeeded by: Max Yzaguirre

Patrick Henry Wood III (born July 4, 1962) was a Texas lawyer who served as chairman of the Public Utility Commission of Texas from 1995 to 2001, and of the Federal Energy Regulatory Commission from 2001 to 2005.

== Biography ==
Born in Port Arthur, Texas, Wood received a B.S. from Texas A&M University and a J.D. from Harvard Law School. Wood was thereafter a legal adviser for the Federal Energy Regulatory Commission in Washington, D.C.

Wood was appointed to the PUC by Governor George W. Bush on February 1, 1995. Wood was voted chairman by his fellow commissioners in June of that year.

On March 27, 2001, President Bush named Wood to chair the Federal Energy Regulatory Commission, where Wood remained until 2005.

Earlier in the same month that he was appointed, Wood voted with the Texas Commission to impose price caps on providers to prevent energy price spikes, suggesting that he would not oppose this practice at the federal level.

In March 2005, in was reported that Wood "warned top electric company officials in a private meeting in January that they need to focus more heavily on cybersecurity". Over the course of his tenure, Wood was reported to have "alienated some on Capitol Hill by pushing hard for a particular approach to national deregulation of wholesale electricity".
