= James Danly =

American attorney and government official

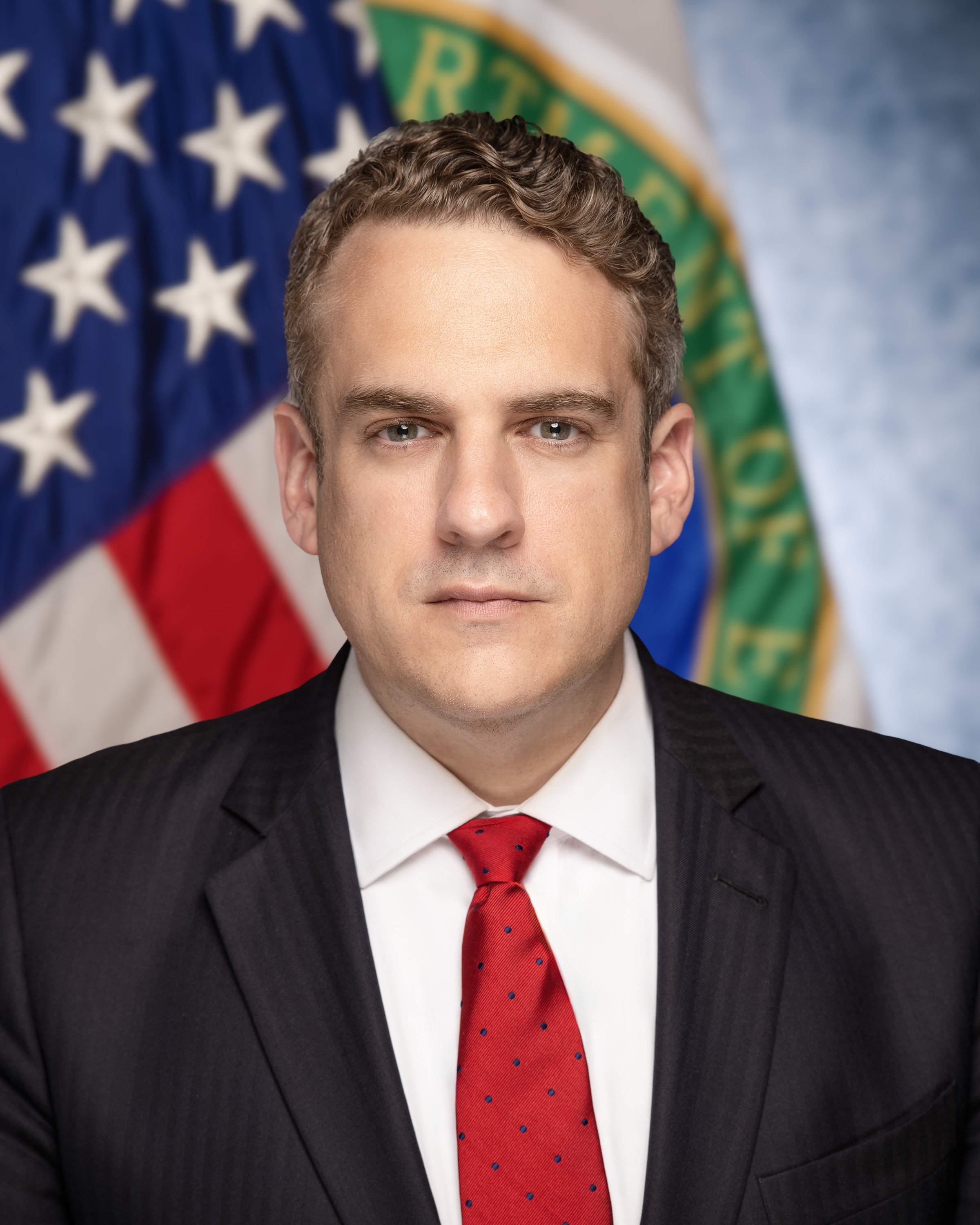
- Official portrait, 2025

22nd United States Deputy Secretary of Energy
- Incumbent
- Assumed office June 11, 2025
- President: Donald Trump
- Preceded by: David Turk

Chair of the Federal Energy Regulatory Commission
- In office November 5, 2020 – January 21, 2021
- President: Donald Trump
- Preceded by: Neil Chatterjee
- Succeeded by: Richard Glick

Member of the Federal Energy Regulatory Commission
- In office March 30, 2020 – January 3, 2024
- President: Donald Trump; Joe Biden
- Preceded by: Kevin J. McIntyre
- Succeeded by: Lindsay See

Personal details
- Born: James Patrick Danly Nashville, Tennessee, U.S.
- Party: Republican
- Education: Yale University (BA); Vanderbilt University (JD)

James Patrick Danly is an American attorney who was a member of the Federal Energy Regulatory Commission. He was nominated by President Donald Trump in 2019 and took office on March 30, 2020. In January 2025, President-elect Donald Trump announced his intention to appoint Danly as Deputy Secretary of the United States Department of Energy.

He formerly served as FERC's general counsel. On November 5, 2020, he was named chairman of FERC. After serving for only 77 days, Danly was demoted on January 21, 2021, when President Biden named Richard Glick Chairman. He stepped down at the end of the 2023-2024 congressional session when his term expired.

== Background ==
Danly was born in Belgium, and has lived in Memphis, Tennessee; Paris, France; and London, England. He earned a Bachelor of Arts degree in English from Yale University and Juris Doctor from Vanderbilt University Law School. After graduating from law school, Danly worked as an attorney in the energy industry, including at the law firm Skadden.
