= Neil Chatterjee =

American lawyer

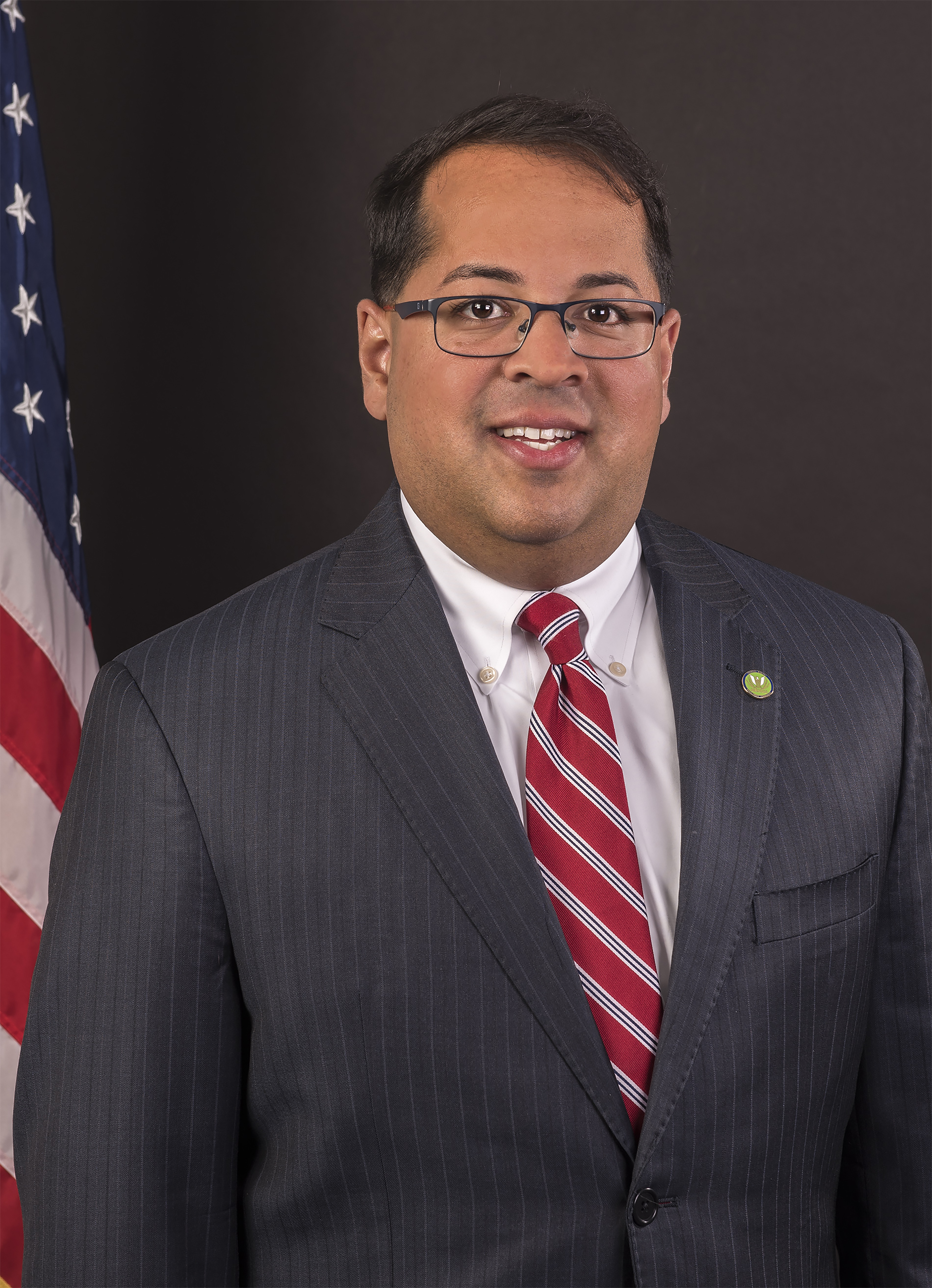

Chairman of the Federal Energy Regulatory Commission
- In office October 24, 2018 – November 5, 2020
- President: Donald Trump
- Preceded by: Kevin J. McIntyre
- Succeeded by: James Danly
- In office August 10, 2017 – December 7, 2017
- President: Donald Trump
- Preceded by: Cheryl LaFleur
- Succeeded by: Kevin J. McIntyre

Member of the Federal Energy Regulatory Commission
- In office August 8, 2017 – August 30, 2021
- President: Donald Trump; Joe Biden
- Preceded by: Anthony T. Clark
- Succeeded by: Willie L. Phillips

Personal details
- Born: Indranil Chatterjee Buffalo, New York, U.S.
- Party: Republican
- Education: St. Lawrence University; University of Cincinnati

Indranil "Neil" Chatterjee (born July 16, 1976) is an American lawyer, political advisor, and government official. A member of the Republican Party, he served on the Federal Energy Regulatory Commission (FERC) from 2017 to 2021. He served as chairman of the commission under President Donald Trump from August 10, 2017, to December 7, 2017, and later from October 24, 2018, to November 5, 2020.

Prior to his appointment to FERC, he served an energy policy advisor to Senate Majority Leader Mitch McConnell. After leaving office, he became an advisor at international law firm Hogan Lovells.

== Early life and education ==
Chatterjee was born on July 16, 1976. His parents, Sunil and Malaya Chatterjee, were medical doctors and cancer researchers. He grew up in Buffalo, New York, attending Nichols School, later living with his family in Lexington, Kentucky.

In 1995, he graduated from Henry Clay High School in Lexington. He later graduated from St. Lawrence University in Canton, New York. Chatterjee later received his legal education from the University of Cincinnati College of Law.

== Early career ==
Chatterjee began his career working on the U.S. House Committee on Ways and Means. He later worked as an aide to Representative Deborah Pryce, then-serving as chairwoman of the House Republican Conference. Chatterjee later worked for the National Rural Electric Cooperative Association, becoming its principal in government relations.

In 2009, Chatterjee joined Senate Republican leader Mitch McConnell as a legislative director in his Senate office. He later became an energy policy advisor.

== Federal Energy Regulatory Commission (FERC) ==
Chatterjee was confirmed by the United States Senate as a member of the Federal Energy Regulatory Commission on August 3, 2017. On August 10, 2017, President Donald Trump designated Chatterjee as chairman of FERC.

On December 7, 2017, Kevin J. McIntyre succeeded Chatterjee as the chairman of FERC. On October 24, 2018, President Donald Trump again designated Chatterjee as chairman of the commission.

=== Tenure ===
As chairman of FERC, Chatterjee was characterized by The Washington Post as an often "outspoken advocate for coal and gas", while also supporting certain clean energy efforts. During his tenure, he was noted by Politico for his use of social media, including "public Twitter battles" with reporters.

==== Removal as chair ====
Chatterjee was fired from his position as chairman on November 5, 2020, the day after the 2020 presidential election. CNN reported that his demotion was a result of Chatterjee's statements in support of clean energy proposals.

Chatterjee stated he was "demoted for my independence" on climate policy matters. He remained a commissioner until his term expired in August 2021. In July 2021, he expressed regret for his role advancing a Trump-era initiative that prioritized coal as an energy source to promote grid resilience. He stated he bore "culpability for why the resilience docket moved the way it did", adding "I didn’t handle it well, and it added this element of politics to what is a real issue".

== Post-FERC career ==
Following his FERC service, he was hired in August 2021 as an advisor at Hogan Lovells' energy regulation practice. In 2024, he was chosen to serve on the board of CarbonCapture, an Arizona-based carbon removal startup.
