= Federal Energy Regulatory Commission =

Independent agency of the US federal government

- Seal of the United States Federal Energy Regulatory Commission

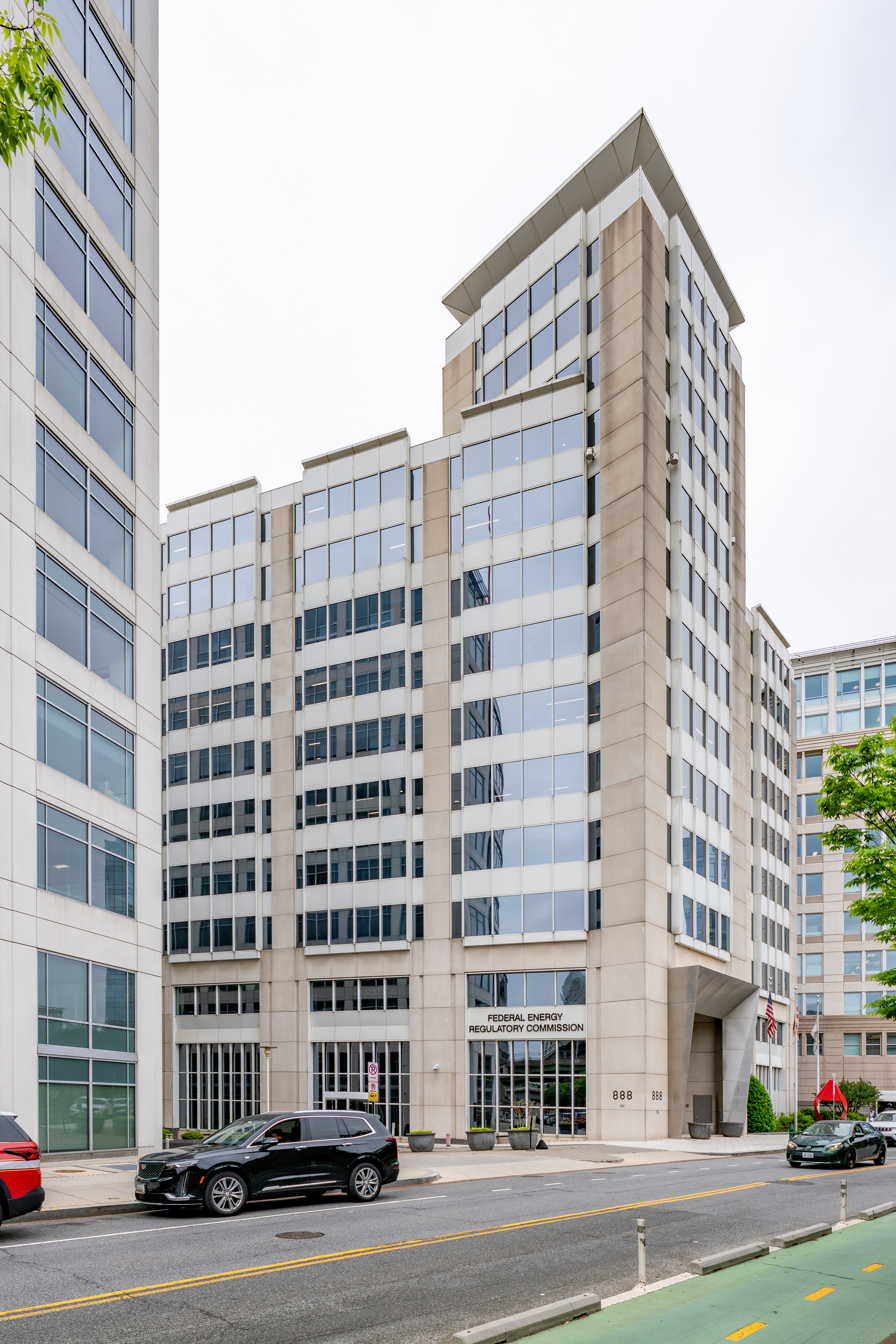
- Headquarters in Washington, D.C.

Agency overview
- Formed: October 1, 1977; 49 years ago
- Preceding agency: Federal Power Commission
- Jurisdiction: U.S. government
- Headquarters: Washington, D.C., U.S.
- Agency executive: Laura Swett, Chairman
- Parent department: United States Department of Energy
- Website: www.FERC.gov

The Federal Energy Regulatory Commission (FERC) is an independent agency of the United States government that regulates the interstate transmission and wholesale sale of electricity and natural gas and the prices of interstate transport of petroleum by pipeline. FERC also reviews proposals to build interstate natural gas pipelines, natural gas storage projects, and liquefied natural gas (LNG) terminals, in addition to licensing non-federal hydropower projects.

FERC was created in 1977 by the United States Congress in the aftermath of the 1973 oil crisis. It is an independent agency, despite being part of the United States Department of Energy. It is headed by five commissioners who are nominated by the president of the United States and confirmed by the United States Senate. There may be no more than three commissioners of one political party serving on the commission at any given time.

== Primary duties ==
The responsibilities of FERC include the following:

- Regulating the transmission and sale of natural gas for resale in interstate commerce;
- Regulating the transmission of oil by pipelines in interstate commerce;
- Regulating the transmission and wholesale sales of electricity in interstate commerce;
- Licensing and inspecting private, municipal, and state hydroelectric projects;
- Approving the siting of and abandonment of interstate natural gas facilities, including pipelines, storage and liquefied natural gas;
- Ensuring the reliability of high voltage interstate transmission system;
- Monitoring and investigating energy markets;
- Using civil penalties and other means against energy organizations and individuals who violate FERC rules in the energy markets;
- Overseeing environmental matters related to natural gas and hydroelectricity projects and major electricity policy initiatives; and
- Administering accounting and financial reporting regulations and regulating businesses of regulated companies.

== Jurisdiction and authorities ==
FERC is a large independent regulatory agency, within the United States Department of Energy, that participates in business oversight. The President and Congress do not generally review FERC decisions, but the decisions are reviewable by the federal courts. FERC is self-funding, in that Congress sets its budget through annual and supplemental appropriations and FERC is authorized to raise revenue to reimburse the United States Treasury for its appropriations, through annual charges to the natural gas, oil, and electric industries it regulates.

FERC is independent of the Department of Energy political structure because FERC activities "shall not be subject to further view by the Secretary [of Energy] or any officer or employee of the Department". The Department of Energy can, however, participate in FERC proceedings as a third party.

FERC has promoted voluntary formation of regional transmission organizations (RTOs) and Independent System Operators (ISOs) to eliminate the potential for undue discrimination in access to the electric grid; it has made key decisions expanding its own power in regional and interregional transmission planning and cost allocation through the landmark Order Nos. 1000, 1920, 1977, and 2023.

FERC investigated the alleged manipulation of electricity market by Enron and other energy companies, and their role in the California electricity crisis. FERC has collected more than $6.3 billion from California electric market participants through settlements. Since passage of the Energy Policy Act of 2005, FERC has imposed, through settlements and orders, more than $1 billion in civil penalties and disgorgement of unjust profits to address violations of its anti-market manipulation and other rules.

FERC regulates approximately 1,600 hydroelectric projects in the U.S. It is largely responsible for permitting construction of a large network of interstate natural gas pipelines. FERC also works closely with the United States Coast Guard to review the safety, security, and environmental impacts of proposed LNG terminals and associated shipping.

== Commissioners ==
FERC is composed of up to five commissioners who are appointed by the President and confirmed by the Senate to staggered five-year terms. The President appoints one of the commissioners to be the chairman of FERC, the administrative head of the agency. FERC is a bipartisan body; no more than three commissioners may be of the same political party. Commissioners may continue in office past the end of their term if a successor has not yet been confirmed, up to the end of the current session of Congress.

The commissioners as of October 27, 2025 are:

Position	Name	Party	Took office	Term expires
Chair	Laura Swett	Republican	October 20, 2025	June 30, 2030
Commissioner	David Rosner	Democratic	June 17, 2024	June 30, 2027
Commissioner	Lindsay See	Republican	June 28, 2024	June 30, 2028
Commissioner	Judy Chang	Democratic	July 15, 2024	June 30, 2029
Commissioner	David LaCerte	Republican	October 27, 2025	June 30, 2031

=== Past commissioners ===
Commissioners	Years served
Don S. Smith	December 13, 1973 – June 30, 1979 (Served as FPC)
Charles B. Curtis	August 10, 1977 – December 31, 1980
Georgiana Sheldon	August 11, 1977 – July 19, 1985
Matthew Holden Jr.	October 28, 1977 – August 31, 1981
George R. Hall	October 28, 1977 – May 8, 1981
J. David Hughes	September 8, 1980 – July 13, 1984
C.M. Butler III	June 5, 1981 – October 7, 1983
Anthony G. Sousa	September 1, 1981 – July 30, 1988
Oliver G. Richard III	August 31, 1982 – July 12, 1985
Raymond J. O'Connor	November 10, 1983 – January 31, 1986
Charles G. Stalon	July 14, 1984 – November 10, 1989
C.M. Naeve	November 4, 1985 – April 30, 1988
Charles A. Trabandt	November 4, 1985 – March 31, 1993
Martha O. Hesse	October 6, 1986 – November 28, 1989
Jerry J. Langdon	October 4, 1988 – June 5, 1993
Elizabeth Anne Moler	October 7, 1988 – June 16, 1997
Martin L. Allday	November 13, 1989 – October 20, 1993
Branko Terzic	October 20, 1990 – May 24, 1993
James J. Hoecker	May 20, 1993 – January 18, 2001
Donald F. Santa Jr.	May 20, 1993 – June 30, 1997
William L. Massey	May 20, 1993 – December 9, 2003
Vicky A. Bailey	May 20, 1993 – January 28, 2000
Curtis L. Hebert Jr.	November 14, 1997 – August 31, 2001
Linda Key Breathitt	November 13, 1997 – November 22, 2002
Patrick H. Wood III	June 5, 2001 – July 8, 2005
Nora Mead Brownell	June 12, 2001 – July 21, 2006
Joseph T. Kelliher	November 21, 2003 – March 13, 2009
Suedeen G. Kelly	November 24, 2003 – December 24, 2009
Marc Spitzer	July 21, 2006 – December 14, 2011
Jon Wellinghoff	July 31, 2006 – November 24, 2013
Philip D. Moeller	July 24, 2006 – October 30, 2015
John R. Norris	January 11, 2010 – August 20, 2014
Cheryl LaFleur	July 13, 2010 – August 30, 2019
Tony Clark	June 15, 2012 – September 30, 2016
Norman Bay	August 4, 2014 – February 3, 2017
Colette D. Honorable	January 5, 2015 – June 30, 2017
Robert Powelson	August 10, 2017 – August 10, 2018
Kevin J. McIntyre	December 7, 2017 – January 2, 2019
Neil Chatterjee	August 8, 2017 – August 30, 2021
Richard Glick	November 29, 2017 – January 3, 2023
Bernard L. McNamee	December 11, 2018 – September 4, 2020
James Danly	March 30, 2020 – January 3, 2024
Allison Clements	December 8, 2020 – June 30, 2024
Willie L. Phillips	December 3, 2021 – April 22, 2025
Mark Christie	January 4, 2021 – August 8, 2025

=== Chairperson ===
Chairmen	Years served
Charles B. Curtis	October 1, 1977 – January 1, 1981
Georgiana Sheldon (Acting)	January 2, 1981 – June 5, 1981
C.M. Butler III	June 5, 1981 – October 5, 1983
Raymond J. O'Connor	November 10, 1983 – January 31, 1986
Anthony G. Sousa (Acting)	February 1, 1986 – October 5, 1986
Martha O. Hesse	October 6, 1986 – November 19, 1989
Martin L. Allday	November 21, 1989 – February 5, 1993
Elizabeth Anne Moler	February 5, 1993 – June 16, 1997
James J. Hoecker	June 19, 1997 – January 18, 2001
William L. Massey	January 19, 2001 – January 21, 2001
Curtis L. Hebert Jr.	January 22, 2001 – August 31, 2001
Patrick H. Wood III	September 1, 2001 – July 8, 2005
Joseph T. Kelliher	July 9, 2005 – January 23, 2009
Jon Wellinghoff (Acting)	January 23, 2009 – March 19, 2009
Jon Wellinghoff	March 19, 2009 – November 24, 2013
Cheryl LaFleur (Acting)	November 25, 2013 – July 30, 2014
Cheryl LaFleur	July 30, 2014 – April 14, 2015
Norman Bay	April 15, 2015 – January 23, 2017
Cheryl LaFleur (Acting)	January 23, 2017 – August 10, 2017
Neil Chatterjee	August 10, 2017 – December 7, 2017
Kevin J. McIntyre	December 7, 2017 – October 24, 2018
Neil Chatterjee	October 24, 2018 – November 5, 2020
James Danly	November 5, 2020 – January 21, 2021
Richard Glick	January 21, 2021 – January 3, 2023
Willie L. Phillips (Acting)	January 3, 2023 – February 9, 2024
Willie L. Phillips	February 9, 2024 – January 20, 2025
Mark Christie	January 20, 2025 – August 8, 2025
David Rosner	August 13, 2025 – October 23, 2025
Laura Swett	October 23, 2025 – Present

== History ==
=== Federal Power Commission ===
The Federal Power Commission (FPC), which preceded FERC, was established by Congress in 1920 to allow cabinet members to coordinate federal hydropower development.

In 1935, the FPC was transformed into an independent regulatory agency with five members nominated by the President and confirmed by the Senate. The FPC was authorized to regulate both hydropower and interstate electricity.

=== Natural Gas Act of 1938 ===
In 1938, the Natural Gas Act gave FPC jurisdiction over interstate natural gas pipelines and wholesale sales. In 1942, this jurisdiction was expanded to cover the licensing of more natural gas facilities. In 1954, the Supreme Court decision in Phillips Petroleum Co. v. Wisconsin extended FPC jurisdiction over all wellhead sales of natural gas in interstate commerce.

=== Birth of DOE; FPC Becomes FERC ===
In response to the 1973 oil crisis, Congress passed the Department of Energy Organization Act in 1977, to consolidate various energy-related agencies into a Department of Energy. Congress insisted that a separate independent regulatory body be retained, and the FPC was renamed the Federal Energy Regulatory Commission (FERC), preserving its independent status within the department. Its most basic mandate was to "determine whether wholesale electricity prices were unjust and unreasonable and, if so, to regulate pricing and order refunds for overcharges to ratepayers." FERC was also given added responsibility to hear appeals of DOE oil price control determinations and to conduct all "on the record" hearings for DOE. As a result, DOE does not have any administrative law judges. As a further protection, when the Department of Energy proposes a rule, it must refer the proposal to FERC, and FERC can take over the proceeding if FERC determines that the rulemaking "may significantly affect" matters in its jurisdiction. The DOE Act also transferred the regulation of interstate oil pipelines from the Interstate Commerce Commission to FERC. However, the FERC lost some jurisdiction over the imports and exports of gas and electricity.

In 1978, FERC was given additional responsibilities for harmonizing the regulation of wellhead gas sales in both the intrastate and interstate markets. FERC also administered a program to foster new cogeneration and small power production under the Public Utilities Regulatory Policy Act of 1978, which was passed as part of the National Energy Act of 1978. The National Energy Act included the Natural Gas Policy Act of 1978, which reduced the scope of federal price regulation, to bring greater competition to both the natural gas and electric industry.

In 1989, Congress ended federal regulation of wellhead natural gas prices, with the passage of the Natural Gas Wellhead Decontrol Act of 1989.

=== Order Nos. 888 and 889 ===
In 1996, FERC issued Order No. 888, which spurred the creation of regional transmission organizations in the United States. This would impact existing electric power pools by rebranding themselves as independent transmission operators. Electric utilities in some regions began to spin off their generation units as separate companies that would compete in a wholesale electric market administered by the RTOs. Once FERC had created the framework for Regional Transmission Organizations with Order No. 888, several such RTOs were approved. The pre-existing multi-state power pool called PJM (Pennsylvania, Jersey, Maryland), the New York Independent System Operator (NYISO), and the Independent Sysoperator New England (ISO-NE) were early adopters. California, with the backing of its state and Congressional policymakers, sought approval of a controversial scheme to set up its ISO, called California Independent System Operator, based near Sacramento, CA. FERC approved it without changes because California had warned that it would not accept any changes. Enron charged one of its policy analysts to figure out how to make the most of the flawed rules put in place for the California electricity market. Enron had success with its fraudulent market transactions.

Order No. 888 mandated that transmission operators open market access to all power generators, including both vertically integrated utility companies and "qualifying facilities" that are independent of those trusts, while Order No. 889 mandated that these generators tie into transmission markets via data portals called "Open Access Same-Time Information Systems".

=== Order No. 2003 ===
In 2003, FERC issued Order No. 2003, which required utilities to standardize their interconnection procedures (linking power plants to the grid) and issue credits to power generators as reimbursement for upfront interconnection costs, over a long time period.

=== Energy Policy Act of 2005 ===
In 2001, the George W. Bush administration sought to give the authority of eminent domain to FERC to circumvent state and local bureaucratic processes which often slowed the siting of new transmission projects. This expansion of power was most fiercely opposed by Bush's own Republican party as being an expansion of federal power. Legal battles over the issue ended with the 2005 Energy Bill (Energy Policy Act of 2005) which was passed with approval of Democrats and Republicans.

The Energy Policy Act of 2005 expanded FERC's authority to protect the reliability and cybersecurity of the bulk power system through the establishment and enforcement of mandatory standards, as well as greatly expanding FERC authority to impose civil penalties on entities that manipulate the electricity and natural gas markets. The Energy Policy Act of 2005 also gave FERC additional responsibilities and authority. Among the many provisions of the law, FERC was given what is known as "backstop" siting authority which allows FERC to overrule any denial of transmission projects by a state within established corridors of transmission congestion "to expand transmission in limited regions of the country facing transmission constraints."

=== Order No. 1000 ===
In 2010, FERC issued Order No. 1000, which required RTOs to create regional transmission plans and identify transmission needs based on public policy. Cost allocation reforms were included, possibly to reduce barriers faced by non incumbent transmission developers.

=== Order No. 841 ===
In February 2018, FERC issued Order No. 841, which required wholesale markets to open up to individual storage installations, regardless of interconnection point (transmission, distribution or behind-the-meter). The Order was challenged in court by the state public utility commissions via the National Association of Regulatory Utility Commissioners (NARUC), the American Public Power Association, and others who claimed that FERC overstepped its jurisdiction by regulating how local electric distribution and behind-the-meter facilities are administered, i.e., in not providing an opt out of wholesale market access for energy storage facilities located at the distribution level or behind-the-meter. A United States courts of appeals court (the D.C. Circuit) issued an order in July 2020 that upheld Order 841 and dismissed the petitioners' complaints.

=== Order No. 2222 ===
FERC issued Order No. 2222 on September 17, 2020, enabling distributed energy resources such as batteries and demand response to participate in regional wholesale electricity markets. Market operators submitted initial compliance plans by early 2022. The Supreme Court had ruled in 2016 in FERC v. Electric Power Supply Ass'n that the agency had the authority to regulate demand response transactions.

=== Order No. 2023 ===
On July 28, 2023, the Federal Energy Regulatory Commission issued Order No. 2023, which regulates the interconnection process that ties renewables projects into the large-scale grid. Among other provisions, the rule requires transmission planners to consolidate projects into 'clusters' for regulatory approval purposes on a 'first-ready, first-served' basis that prioritizes the most well-studied and fully financed projects, spread grid upgrade costs over multiple projects, forecast advanced technologies, and allow for multiple projects to share a new single interconnection point. It also "imposes firm deadlines and penalties if transmission providers fail to complete interconnection studies on time".

On March 21, 2024, FERC issued Order No. 2023-A, an amendment clarifying certain provisions in the order, such as compliance filing requirements, the deadline for utilities to edit interconnect requests upon submission, the role of substation use in determining cost allocation, and the use of surety bonds in financing.

=== Order Nos. 1920 and 1977 ===
On May 13, 2024, FERC issued Order Nos. 1920 and 1977. The former order requires utilities to plan 20 years in advance to anticipate future regional (though not interregional) transmission needs, with five-year updates, and to cooperate in creating a default cost-sharing plan to deliver to state regulators. It "provides for cost-effective expansion of transmission that is being replaced, when needed, known as 'right-sizing' transmission facilities", and it allows states more opportunities to cooperate with utility companies and energy project developers, while preventing states that benefit from regional transmission projects from not paying for them. FERC Order No. 1920-A, an amendment to it passed unanimously the following November, allows state regulators even more opportunities to provide input on interstate grid projects, adds six months to the cost allocation negotiating process, and gives utilities more leeway to forecast additional needs scenarios.

The latter order affirms FERC's siting authority in National Interest Electric Transmission Corridors if a state regulatory agency denies any of its own siting responsibility thereof. The order creates an Applicant Code of Conduct to encourage proper landowner outreach, and adds air quality, environmental justice and tribal engagement reports to the list of requirements for project applicants.

== Criticism ==
FERC has been subject to criticism and increasing activism by people from communities affected by its decisions approving pipeline and related projects. They contend that FERC "blithely greenlights too many pipelines, export terminals and other gas infrastructure" and that FERC's structure in which it recovers its annual operating costs directly from the entities it regulates creates bias in favor of the issuance of pipeline certificates. Some of the critics have disrupted several regular open meetings of the Commission and staged a couple of week-long blockades of FERC's headquarters in Washington, D.C., to make their points. "Pipelines are facing unprecedented opposition," Commissioner LaFleur remarked to the National Press Club in a 2015 speech. "We have a situation here."

FERC's decisions in those cases are often upheld by the courts. In a July 1, 2014, decision, No Gas Pipeline v. Federal Energy Regulatory Commission, the United States Court of Appeals for the District of Columbia Circuit (D.C. Circuit) said that pipeline applicants are not likely to pursue many certificates that are hopeless. "The fact that they generally succeed in choosing to expend their resources on applications that serve their own financial interests does not mean that an agency which recognizes merit in such applications is biased," the court said. Others have directly disputed FERC's critics by pointing out, "FERC is a creature of law. It follows a careful administrative path to regulate only a portion of natural gas such as interstate pipelines and LNG import and export terminals. That regulation includes extensive environmental review, driven by many federal laws enacted by Congress, signed by the president, and reviewed and upheld by the U.S. Supreme Court. If the agency were to adopt the path [suggested by these critics], FERC's decisions would routinely be overturned by the federal courts."

The United States District Court for the District of Columbia also dismissed a case involving allegations of structural bias on the part of FERC. The plaintiffs contended that the Omnibus Budget Act of 1986 funding mechanism requires the commission to recover its budget through proportional charges on regulated entities, therefore making FERC biased in favor of the industry from which it gets its funding. But in an order issued March 22, 2017, the court said the plain language of the statute indicates that FERC does not have control over its own budget. "The Commission's budget cannot be increased by approving pipelines; rather, [the statute] requires the Commission to make adjustments to 'eliminate any overrecovery or underrecovery.' If Plaintiffs are unhappy with Congress's chosen appropriations to the Commission..., Plaintiffs' recourse lies with their legislative representatives."

In New Jersey, the FERC approval of the PennEast Pipeline was met with widespread criticism by environmental groups, which called the decision highly partisan. "FERC has once again demonstrated its tremendous bias for, and partnership with, the pipeline industry," said Maya van Rossum, leader of the Delaware Riverkeeper Network. Doug O'Malley, president of Environment New Jersey, called the FERC approval of the pipeline a "disaster." David Pringle, state campaign director of Clean Water Action and 2018 Congressional candidate, suggested the FERC was serving a partisan interest over the interests of the people of New Jersey, suggesting "The FERC needs to remember it works for the people of the United States not PennEast." In July 2018, the D.C. Circuit Court of Appeals rejected the Delaware Riverkeeper Network and Maya Van Rossum's claim that FERC has an incentive to award pipeline certificates because it collects its operating expenses from regulated parties. Upholding a lower court ruling, the D.C. Circuit also rejected the Delaware Riverkeeper Network's challenge to FERC's use of tolling orders to meet its statutory deadlines for acting on rehearing applications.

However, the D.C. Circuit has provided additional guidance concerning Commission procedures, stating that in one case FERC failed to consider the cumulative environmental impact of four projects that had been separately proposed by the same pipeline. The D.C. Circuit held that the projects were not financially independent and were "a single pipeline" that was "linear and physically interdependent," so the cumulative environmental impacts should have been considered concurrently. In a separate decision, the D.C. Circuit later sustained the commission's conduct of separate environmental assessments when it clarified that the "critical" factor was that all of the pipeline's projects were either under construction or pending before FERC for environmental review at the same time, noting that the projects lacked temporal overlap. Furthermore, in another case, the D.C. Circuit sustained the commission's use of a separate environmental assessment when it reasoned that the projects in dispute were "unrelated" and did not depend on one another for their justification. This guidance has allowed FERC to address additional claims of improper segmentation.

FERC's leaders have stressed many times since the onset of the increased activism that the proper way to oppose a proposed new infrastructure project is by participating in the related proceeding by submitting comments and participating in public comment sessions, site visits and scoping meetings, since FERC decisions can be appealed up to the Supreme Court.

=== Federal versus state authority ===
There are regions of the country where the state public utility commission and the FERC regulated Regional Transmission Organization operate in identical footprints (such as in New York State). Where this occurs, state policy makers and FERC frequently clash as to the extent of federal power and influence within the state.

The planning and siting of public policy and renewable power plants and merchant transmission lines can be contentious, because the planning process must proceed through both entities. For example, in New York State, any large (more than 20 MW for the NYISO or 2 MW for the state Siting Committee) generation or merchant transmission facility must proceed through both the planning process of the NYISO, which operates on a two-year cycle at minimum with an inclusive class year pool of new projects evaluated simultaneously, and the siting process of the state Board on Electric Siting and the Environment. Prior to the formation of the NYISO, the planning process was determined mostly by the state siting board (although the utilities' power pool might have had its own closed door planning session) and large generation projects were developed by the utilities themselves. The dual planning process provides an opportunity for other market participants to drag out the process legally, not including the other state and/or federal environmental, trade (if an international connection with Canada is requested), and local certification and regulation processes that need to be met.

The controversy similarly applies to various electric wholesale-market issues within the RTO, when a state public utility commission asserts that its retail ratepayers (under state regulation) will be impacted by wholesale-market stakeholder decisions and reforms (under federal-level regulation). In contrast, prior to the formation of the NYISO in 1999 in New York, wholesale energy prices were set within a utility's state rate case proceeding. Examples of contentious issues in New York include the NYISO's development of buyer-side mitigation (price floors) in its capacity market, proxy peaking-unit specifications during the demand-curve reset (that helps set capacity market prices), the state's granting of zero-emissions credits to wholesale-market participating nuclear power plants, and the creation of a new capacity zone amidst state and transmission owner policy initiatives.

== See also ==
- Category:Federal Energy Regulatory Commission chairpersons
- 21st-century fossil fuel regulations in the United States
- Custody transfer
- High-voltage direct current
- North American Electric Reliability Corporation (NERC)
- United States energy law
- Scenic Hudson Preservation Conference v. Federal Power Commission
- Title 18 of the Code of Federal Regulations
- BIG WIRES Act – Proposed electrical transmission legislation directing FERC to mandate minimum interregional capacity
