= San Francisco Law School =

Private law school in San Francisco, California

Coordinates: 37°46′22″N 122°25′21″W

- Parent school: Alliant International University
- Established: 1909
- School type: For-profit private
- Location: Emeryville, California, U.S.
- Enrollment: 5 (2023)
- Faculty: 2 FT (2023)
- USNWR ranking: Not ranked
- Bar pass rate: 7% (2022)
- Website: www.alliant.edu/sfls/

San Francisco Law School is a private, for-profit law school in San Francisco, California. Founded in 1909, it is the oldest evening law school in the Western United States. It is not accredited by the ABA, nor is it accredited or registered with the State Bar of California.

== History ==
Founded in 1909, the school became non-profit in 1941 and moved to Haight Street in 1968, where it remained for almost 50 years before relocating to its present campus on Beach Street, near Fisherman's Wharf.

The law school offers a four-year, part-time evening program leading to a Juris Doctor degree. In July 2010, the law school completed a merger to become a for-profit, graduate school of Alliant International University.

In 2014, San Diego Law School opened as a branch campus of San Francisco Law School and located in the Walter Library on Alliant's campus in San Diego at Scripps Ranch. The branch campus closed in 2023 upon the law school's reversion to registered unaccredited status.

== Accreditation ==
SFLS is not accredited by the American Bar Association. San Francisco Law School was approved by the Committee of Bar Examiners from 1937 to 2023, when it became a registered unaccredited distance learning law school. As of 2026, the school is not listed among registered unaccredited law schools in California.

Through Alliant International University, San Francisco Law School is regionally accredited by the Western Association of Schools and Colleges.

== Admission and enrollment ==
In 2022, an LSAT score of 147 was required for full admission to the school, although students with LSAT scores between 140 and 146 could be considered for conditional admission.

In 2023, the law school enrolled 5 students.

Currently, San Francisco Law School is not accepting new students.

== Bar Passage Rates ==
Of the 14 SFLS alumni who took the California Bar Exam for the first time in July 2022, one passed, for a 7% passage rate, vs. a 36% average for California-accredited law schools and 67% average overall.

SFLS had a five-year cumulative bar pass rate of 36% from 2017 to 2021, below the 40% threshold established by the State Bar of California. As a result, the school was placed on probation until July 1, 2022. The State Bar extended the school's probation until July 1, 2023, after it posted a bar passage rate of 35.4% for period ending in 2022. The probation was further extended to August 31, 2023, at which time SFLS again failed to achieve the minimum 40% requirement with a bar passage rate of 36.7% . As a result, SFLS became a registered unaccredited law school.

== Tuition ==
Based on 2018-2019 amounts, for a complete course of study with passing grades tuition was $80,910.

== Alumni ==
- Oscar Zeta Acosta, Chicano militant, friend of Hunter S. Thompson and inspiration for the character "Dr. Gonzo" in Fear and Loathing in Las Vegas.
- Edmund "Pat" Brown, former California Governor and father of former California Governor Jerry Brown
- Geoffrey F. Brown, former five-term San Francisco Public Defender and commissioner of the California Public Utilities Commission
- Wayne M. Collins, civil rights attorney and co-founder of the American Civil Liberties Union, Northern California Chapter; argued Korematsu v. United States before the United States Supreme Court
- Charles Garry, Marxist lawyer, chief counsel for the Black Panther Party, attorney for the People's Temple and counsel in many famous cases, including the San Quentin Six, Chicago Seven and the Oakland Seven (demonstrations in Berkeley against the Vietnam War)
- Esther Hwang, American model, former Miss Asian America, and former scheduling secretary for San Francisco mayor Willie Brown
- Milton Marks, former California State Senator
- Leo T. McCarthy, former Lieutenant Governor of California
- Huey Newton, attended SFLS for eight months, but did not graduate
- Joseph F. Salgado, 7th United States deputy secretary of energy from 1988 to 1989
- Dorothy von Beroldingen, San Francisco political figure, feminist and San Francisco Superior Court Judge
