= Miss Sing Tao =

Beauty pageant

The Miss Sing Tao pageant has been hosted by Sing Tao Daily in San Francisco since 2003. Every month, a Cover Girl is chosen to compete in the final competition, which is usually held in December. The winners of the monthly and year-end pageants serve as ambassadors for Sing Tao Daily and the Chinese-American community.

== Eligibility and Instructions ==
To be eligible for the Miss Sing Tao pageant, applicants must be at least 15 years old, of at least partial Chinese descent, unmarried, and have legal residency in the United States.
Applications packets must include:

- A completed application form achievable in the Sing Tao Daily Western Edition publications
- Two recent 4R photographs, one full body and one profile shot
- Applicant’s resume in Chinese and/or English
- 300 – 500-word introductory cover letter
- Application fee

All applications will be carried over every month until December. Rules are (or can be) changed at any time and applicants will not be informed individually.
Please refer to Sing Tao Daily Western Edition for updates and contact information.
The contestant must not be the employee (or his/her family member) of Sing Tao Daily News Group.

=== Preliminary Competition ===
Judges will select a contestant every month to proceed in the Final Competition. Each contestant will be featured as a Monthly Cover Girl (Titleholder) on the Sing Tao Weekly Magazine with additional interviews on Sing Tao Daily and Sing Tao TV, receives exquisite gifts, and be printed in the following year's Sing Tao Cover Girl Calendar.

=== Final Competition ===
All 12 Cover Girls within each year will compete in the Final Competition hosted in December. They will be judged in three mandatory segments (opening number and introduction; sports and lifestyle; and on-stage question in evening wear) and an optional talent segment.

== Pageant Titleholders ==
Year	Miss Sing Tao	1st Princess (2009-2010, 2017-)	2nd Princess (2009-2010, 2017-)	Talent	Photogenic (2003-2008, 2011-)	Dynamic Angel (2003-2008, 2012, 2018) Charisma (2024)	People's Choice (2004-2011, 2013, 2019-)	Congeniality (2014)
2003	Diana Qi	--	Lauria Wu	--	Diana Qi	Diana Qi	--	--
2004	Janice Xin	--	--	Fonda Chen	Janice Xin	Cindy Lee	Theresa Shi	--
2005	Claire Yuan	--	--	Lynn Ngai	Jiapei Sun	Jasmine Nachtigall	Jessica Tsai	--
2006	Joanna Wu	--	--	Joanna Wu	Lillian Yee		Jessica Chen	--
2007	Lisa Fei	--	--	Tiffany Tam	Sanyee Yuan	Lisa Fei	Esme Liu	--
2008	Christina Zhang	--	--	Annie Zhou	Christina Zhang	Yanni Ding	Alice Pan	--
2009	Jocelyn Low	Vicky Hibbert	Sally Zhang	Gloria Yang	--	--	Frances Wang	--
2010	Rita Huang	Rebecca Hu	Emily Tang	Rebecca Hu	--	--	Ruby Wong	--
2011	Michelle Kay	--	--	Vivian Wei	Aurora Li	--	Sammy Huang	--
2012	Diana Weng	--	--	Cathy Yuan	Esther Mao	Shirley Liu	--	--
2013	Jewel Pi	--	--	Irene Wang	Michelle Thach	--	Elaine Liao	--
2014	Ge Wang	--	--	Emily Lam	Megan Lo	--	--	Tiffany Meng
2015	Michelle Wang	--	--	Rachel Wu	Natalie Chen	--	--	--
2016	Chelsea Lo	--	--	Aurelia Yang	Cecilia Jing	--	--	--
2017	Crystal Guo	Mawyuan Lee	Jaclyn Liang	Elina Meng	Dian Yu		Rhonda Chan	--
2018	Tara Nash	Elena Lottich	Felisha Fan	Nicole Lee	Tara Nash	Tiffany Wong	--	--
2019	Catherine Yu	Amber Xu	Gabriella Lim	Katherine Zhang	Rachel Gu	--	Catherine Yu	--
2020	Kylie Chang	Alexis Huang	Jessie Chen	Alicia Yang	Leanna Le	Vicki Pu	Jessie Chen	--
2021	Selina Zhu	Ashley Wong	Jessica Li	Jessica Li	Aymi Lin	--	Gemma Wu	--
2022	Zoe Yip	Selena Jiang	Diane Loughry	Zoe Yip	Serena Qiao	--	Nathalie Situ	--
2023	Chloe You	Jasmine White	Angelina Zhao	Winnie Chen	Chloe You	--	Myra Wong	--
2024	Maggie Xu	Helena Wang	Danielle Song	Katrina Luong	Maggie Xu	Lily Tao	Nicole Tam	--
2025	Emily Shao	Alicia Tang	Selina Wang	Vivian Chang	Emily Shao	Selina Wang	Emily Shao	--

== Monthly Titleholders ==
2026	Jan	Feb	Mar	Apr	May	Jun	Jul	Aug	Sep	Oct	Nov	Dec
2026	Julianna; Lai 來景佳	Amy; Gao 高尚	Alyssa; Yeung 羊巧恩	Maggie; Zhou 周美吉	Qina; Lai 賴桂瑩	Angela; Lin 林安琪	Susanna; Liang 梁焯嵐	Audrey; Zhang 張辰伊				

Previous Year	Jan	Feb	Mar	Apr	May	Jun	Jul	Aug	Sep	Oct	Nov	Dec
2003	Dianna; Qi 戚潔	Jian; Shen 申靜	Lauria; Wu 胡嘉盈	Jessica; Lee 李紫雯	Maggie; Liu 劉美鳯	Shu Yun; Liu 劉書韻	玉銘鑫	Jolyn 寇天麗	Allie; Hong 洪于舜	Stephanie; Yuan 阮思琴	Sharlene; Wang 王卓爽	Julie; Mak 麥麗霞
2004	Juju; Wang 王玨	Theresa; Shi 師帥	Virginia; Fung 馮愛民	Vivian; Yu 余綺雯	Fanny; Han 韓以厚	Meldy; Imelda 張鳯嬌	Gao; Shan 高珊	Jocelyn; Lee 李思瑩	Cindy; Lee 李超敏	Selina; Shao 邵月	Fonda; Chen 陳芳達	Janice; Xin 辛潔婷
2005	Jiapei; Sun 孫嘉佩	Pearl; Chou 周穎瑜	Sandy; Hui 許彩霞	Cindy; Ting 丁明慧	Jasmine; Nachtigall 納佳敏	Lynn; Ngai 魏嘉玲	Claire; Yuan 原遠	Jessica; Tsai 蔡華珍	Stephanie; Lai 黎家珍	Chyna; Chuu 褚千慧	Elizabeth; Mak 麥綺庭	Yanelli; Kong 孔穎茵
2006	Franchesca; Pang 彭靜怡	Snow; Li 李雪	Naomi; Qu 屈冷瑉	Tian Tian; Zhang 張天田	Lillian; Yee 余慧森	Joanna; Wu 吳少駿	Jenny; Chin 陳小婷	Jani; Wang 汪敏潔	Jacqueline; Sand 閃香香	Lily; Chen 陳喆瑋	Jessica; Chen 陳俐安	Cherrie; Rao 饒白曼
2007	Laura; Sallette 楊青晴	Evelyn; Pan 潘盈涵	Jessie; Wu 吳加珂	Esme; Liu 劉正音	Tiffany; Tam 譚芬妮	Sanyee; Yuan 阮聖宇	Corinne; Tu 涂曉宇	Ellen; Ho 何健敏	Snow; Feng 封雪	Lisa; Fei 費麟	Jane; Zhao 趙錚	Celia; Wong 黃樂斯
2008	Shadow; Liu 劉暢	Annie; Wang 王安妮	Selena; Mao 毛娜娜	Mimi; Lee 李詩蘋	Sophie; Xu 許雯霏	Frances; Yee 余家嘉	Zoe; Zhao 趙東冬	Annie; Zhou 周夢瑩	Elaine; Wang 王季婷	Yanni; Ding 丁嫣妮	Christina; Zhang 張子倩	Alice; Pan 潘思平
2009	Jenny; Gu 初夏	Sally; Zhang 張逢媛	Christine; Hsu 許慧瑩	Lydia; Hou 侯詩綺	Frances; Wang 王依凡	Stephanie; Guan 關佩儀	Shirley; Yang 楊詩婷	Lisa; Lee 李嘉晶	Vicky; Hibbert 宋元金	Gloria; Yang 楊淑宇	Mona; Zhao 趙夢欣	Jocelyn; Low 劉彥沁
2010	Jenny; Tsang 曾雪妍	Lucy; Zhu 朱露茜	Doris; Xu 許多	Rita; Huang 黃馨瑤	Sunny; Lin 林嘉星	Ruby; Wong 王璐儀	Emily; Su 蘇航	Annie; Yang 楊蘊	Crystal; Wang 王雅怡	Josephine; Leu 呂家甄	Rebecca; Hu 胡貝貝	Emily; Tang 唐夢晗
2011	Jessica; Pan 潘尚敏	Sammy; Huang 黃倩媚	Jade; Chen 陳嘉琦	Cynthia; Yu 于慧觀	Grace; Chen 陳秦	Nicole; Au-Yeung 歐陽力高	Shelly; Tam 譚穎欣	Michelle; Kay 袁凱琪	Aurora; Li 李佳	Vivian; Wei 韋莉芠	Phebe; Shen 申曉霏	Xia; Li 李夏
2012	Iris; Wen 溫凱琳	Lyla; Khan 韓曉君	Nicole; Tang 唐家琦	Shirley; Liu 劉夢穎	Cathy; Yuan 袁烺	Esther; Mao 毛文君	Michelle; Wu 吳嘉麗	Diana; Noriega-Weng 翁菲菲	Rachel; Zhang 張雅涵	Cynthia; Huang 黃馨儀	Joanna; Leung 梁靜筠	Michelle; Chang 張宇心
2013	Natalynn; Chun 陳慧慈	Nanxi; Liu 劉南茜	Kelly; Chan 陳家麗	Elaine; Liao 廖玉玲	Irene; Wang 王美美	Lia; Yue 樂美宏	Michelle; Thach 石婉如	Milly; Cao 曹雯	Michelle; Guan 關明雪	Jewel; Pi 畢瑾瑜	Sophia; Cao 曹蔚儷	Alison; Chan 陳加恩
2014	Megan; Lo 盧貴芳	Shannie; Chen 陳星穎	Tiffany; Meng 孟令潔	Kiki; Lin 林綺琪	Emily; Lam 林曉晴	Jennie; Li 李佳妮	Diya; Li 李迪婭	Sulina; Kho 許淑琪	Theresa; Nguy 魏紫芬	Ge; Wang 王戈	Gwyneth; Hunger 周如敏	Alvina; Lu 盧潤思
2015	Shawna; Ho 何彤彤	Katrina; Xu 徐振坤	Michelle; Wang 王卓珉	Carrie; Chen 陳可馨	Cindy; Yuan 袁子宸	Lily; Liu 劉津溢	Crystal; Lee 李詩濤	Wenting; He 何汶莛	Margaret; Jiang 姜月瑩	Katia; Li 李海怡	Natalie; Chen 陳清清	Rachel; Wu 吳蕊
2016	Felicia; Tang 湯珺潔	Anna; Zheng 鄭安安	Shiyi; Yang 楊詩溢	Cecilia; Jing 金格格	Aurelia; Yang 楊美琪	Elva; Yan 顏 顏	Odile; Jah 賈藝軒	Sabrina; Chen 陳家媛	Nina; Chang 張璨因	Chelsea; Lo 盧定禧	Katherine; Wu 吳沛琳	Summer; Zhou 周 璇
2017	Diane; Yu 于典	Sophia; Bruinsma 趙禧鳳	Shannon; Zhao 趙仙妮	Mawyuan; Lee 李茂媛	Angela; Li 李安祺	Crystal; Guo 郭辰玥	Janella; Jiang 江莉娜	Rhonda; Chan 陳龍珠	Jaclyn; Liang 梁潔琳	Jessica; Chang 張家雯	Karen; Ching 程嘉惠	Elina; Meng 孟碧紅
2018	Claire; Chen 陳馨澐	Grace; Chyu 曲慶薇	Yvonne; Qiu 邱羽晴	Haidee; Xu 許悅	Elena; Lottich 劉麗娜	Felisha; Fan 范文馨	Tara; Nash 黃美華	Tiffany; Cao 曹馨尹	Tiffany; Wong 黃嘉琪	Carrie; Liang 梁嘉榆	Nicole; Lee 李芮妮	Jenny; Ke 柯嘉妮
2019	Rachele; Gu 顧佳意	Callia; Yuan 原 雪	Katherine; Zhang 章業欣	Kerri; Wu 吳凱莉	Alisha; Tam 譚婉明	Gabriella; Lim 林梅英	Tiffany; Lee 李雨萱	Lily; Li 李潔盈	Stephanie; Guan 關欣儀	Annie; Lee 李予如	Catherine; Yu 余金茼	Amber; Xu 徐 香
2020	Joyce; Luo 羅婕瑩	Hannah; Wu 吳雨婷	Vicki; Pu 蒲皓恩	Leanna; Le 黎安娜	Alicia; Yang 楊夢雲	Katherine; Yeh 葉永安	Kylie; Chang 章以琳	Alexis; Huang 黃哲裕	Jessie; Chen 陳潔西	Michelle; Li 李 潔	Victoria; Fang 方欣怡	Briana; Yik 易慧怡
2021	Melody; Jie 解田彤	Christy; Lu 盧海琪	Hillary; Chu 朱嘉慶	Tiffany; Fong 方 蘇	Kaede; Shimizu 肖嫻雅	Jessica; Li 李佳佳	Ashley; Wong 黃雍祺	Kelly; Zhao 趙麗雲	Selina; ZhuLo 朱琳𤥶	Gemma; Wu 吳 靜	Aymi; Lin 林雅雯	Megan; Ho 何宇仙
2022	Isabelle; Hsu 許謙柔*	Winky; Li 李穎棋	Nathalie; Situ 司徒穎琪	Xuan; Zhang 張璿	Avril; Wang Brown 柏艾薇	Katherine; Cheng 程惟靜	Diane; Loughry 姜夢蕾	Serena; Qiao 喬陽	Selena; Jiang 姜雨瑤	Fiona; Li 李嘉怡	Zoe; Yip 葉頌怡	Marisa; Chin 陳綺珊
2023	Catherine; Luong 梁嘉恩	ShuHan; Xue 薛書涵	Winnie; Chen 陳曉儀	Brianna; Feldmeier 王安娜	Jasmine; White 白思玉	Mina; Chen 陳汝珊	Lillian; Campbell 林麗仁	Angelina; Zhao 趙其羽	Myra; Wong 黃紫晴	Alyse; McBride 陳嘉旺	Chloe; You 游洛伊	Kaitlyn; Diep 葉慧妍
2024	Vicky; Zhao 趙美晴	Danielle; Song 宋家迎	Katrina; Luong 梁嘉敏	Lori; Gin 甄希	Helena; Wang 王天悅	Nicole; Tam 譚慧文	Pearl; Yeh Lee 李凱玲	Maggie; Xu 徐伊一	Callista; Wong 黃穗盈	Lily; Tao 陶麗酈	Nicole; Krawczyk 姜睿溢	Chelsea; Li 李昇穎
2025	Lily; Yang 楊怡萱	JoJo; Zeng 曾嘉美	Jamie; Chen 陳苡羚	Megan; Lu 盧奕妏	Doris; Gao 高歌	Shannon; Zhang 張樂儀	Emily; Shao 邵佳燁	Vivian; Chang 張韶葳	Sophie; Suo 索煜倩	Selina; Wang 王思雅	Eva; Fan 范伊娃	Alicia; Tang 唐佳琦

== Titleholders' Progress in National Pageants ==
=== Miss Chinatown USA ===
Year	Representative	Award(s)	Year in Miss Sing Tao
2008	Tiffany Tam*	Miss Chinese Chamber of Commerce/First Princess	2007
2009	Claire Yuan*	Miss Talent	2005
2010	Christina Zhang*	Miss San Francisco Chinatown	2008
2010	Shadow Liu	Not Placed	2008
2011	Lisa Fei*	Miss San Francisco Chinatown	2007
2011	Jenny Chin	Not Placed	2006
2012	Snow Feng	Miss San Francisco Chinatown	2007
2012	Jenny Chin	Second Princess	2006
2012	Annie (Mengying) Zhou*	Not Placed	2008
2013	Sanyee Yuan*	Miss San Francisco Chinatown	2007
2014	Shirley (Mengying) Liu*	Miss San Francisco Chinatown	2012
2015	Jewel Pi*	Second Princess	2013
2016	Michelle Chang	Miss Chinese Chamber of Commerce/First Princess	2012
2016	Ge Wang*	Third Princess	2014
2016	Theresa Nguy	Fourth Princess	2014
2017	Emily Lam*	Fourth Princess	2014
2017	Michelle Wu	Not Placed	2012
2017	Alison Chan	Not Placed	2013
2018	Aurelia Yang*	Miss Chinese Chamber of Commerce/First Princess	2016
2019	Katherine Wu*	Miss Chinatown USA	2016
2020	Felisha Fan*	Miss San Francisco Chinatown	2018
2020	Nicole Lee	Fourth Princess	2018
2021	Event Postponed		
2022	Crystal Lee*	Miss Chinatown USA	2015
2022	Yvonne Qiu	Not Placed	2018
2022	Melody Jie	Not Placed	2021
2023	Megan Lo*	Miss San Francisco Chinatown	2014
2023	Aymi Lin	Fourth Princess; Miss Charity	2021
2024	Tara Wong-Nash*	Miss Chinatown USA	2018
2024	Catherine Yu	Fourth Princess	2019
2025	Amber Xu*	Miss Chinese Chamber of Commerce/First Princess	2019
2026	Diane Loughry*	Not Placed	2022

(*) Sponsored by Sing Tao Daily

=== Miss Asian Global/America ===
Year	Representative	Award(s)	Year in Miss Sing Tao
2006	Claire Yuan*	Miss Asian San Francisco	2005
2008	Jenny Chin	Not Placed	2006
2009
2009	Laura Sallette*	Not Placed	2007
2009	Tiffany Tam	Miss Talent	2007
2009	Jane Zhao	Not Placed	2007
2009	Annie Zhou	Not Placed	2008
2012	Emily Tang*	Miss Asian America; First Princess	2010
2015	Jennie Li*	Miss Asian San Francisco; Second Princess	2014
2015	Theresa Nguy	Not Placed	2014
2016	Crystal Lee*	Miss Asian Best in Cultural Attire; Top Ten Finalist	2015
2020	Tara Nash*	Miss Asian San Francisco; Third Princess	2018
2020	Megan Lo	Miss Asian S.T.E.M.	2014
2020	Lily Li	Miss Asian Best in Cultural Attire; Miss Asian Charity	2019
2022	Aymi Lin*	Miss Asian Congeniality	2021
2023	Kylie Chang*	Miss Asian Global	2021
2023	Felicia Tang	Miss Asian California; First Princess; Miss Asian S.T.E.M.	2016
2023	Marisa Chin	Miss Asian Social Media; Miss Asian Community Service	2022
2025	Diane Loughry*	not placed	2022
2026	Lily Tao*	Miss Asian Global; Miss Talent	2024
2026	Nathalie Situ	Not Placed	2022

(*) Sponsored by Sing Tao Daily
- Note: Starting 2012, the Miss Asian America Pageant expanded to become the Miss Asian Global Pageant where delegates around the world can vie for the title.

=== Miss Chinese Beauty ===
(Former Name: Miss New York Chinese Pageant)

Year	Representative	Award(s)	Year in Miss Sing Tao
2026	Aymi Lin	Miss Chinese Beauty	2021

=== Miss America ===
Year	Representative	Award(s)	Year in Miss Sing Tao
2006	Jasmine Nachtigall	Miss California's Outstanding Teen First Runner-Up; Miss San Francisco's Outstanding Teen	2005
2010	Tiffany Tam	Miss San Jose	2007
2010	Jasmine Nachtigall	Miss California Top 12 Finalist; Miss Yosemite Valley	2005
2012	Vivian Wei	Miss San Francisco	2011
2013	Michelle Chang	Miss Gavilan Hills; Miss San Francisco First Runner-Up	2012
2013	Diana Noriega-Weng	Miss San Francisco Second Runner-Up	2012
2014	Diana Noriega-Weng	Miss Redwood City/San Mateo County	2012
2017	Natalie Chen	Miss California's Outstanding Teen Top 13; Miss Golden Gate's Outstanding Teen: Best in Talent Award	2015
2018	Crystal Lee	Miss County of San Francisco (Placed First Runner-Up but assumed title after resignation of original titleholder)	2015
2022	Katherine Wu	Miss Texas Top 15; Miss Gulf Coast	2016
2023	Katherine Wu	Miss South Texas	2016
2023	Tara Nash	Miss Queens	2018

=== Miss USA ===
Year	Representative	Award(s)	Year in Miss Sing Tao
2025	Kylie Chang	Miss California USA; Miss Golden State	2020

=== Miss National Asia ===
Year	Representative	Award(s)	Year in Miss Sing Tao
2007	Claire Yuan	First Princess	2005
2007	Jacqueline Sand	Second Princess	2006

== Titleholders' Progress in International Pageants ==
=== Miss Chinese Cosmos ===
Year	Representative	Award(s)
2004	Diana Qi	Miss Friendship and the Most Likely to Win

=== Miss Chinese International ===
Year	Representative	Award(s)
2015	Shirley Liu	Not Placed
