= Elena J. Duarte =

American lawyer

Elena J. Duarte (born c. March–May 1966 in San Jose, California) is an Associate Justice of the California Third District Court of Appeal, having served since December 10, 2010, after being appointed to the post by Republican Governor Arnold Schwarzenegger on November 23, 2010.

== Education ==
A native Californian of Mexican-American descent, Duarte attended the University of the Pacific for two years from 1984 to 1986 but transferred to the University of Southern California, where she earned a Bachelor of Arts degree in 1989. She went on to earn a Juris Doctor degree from Stanford Law School in 1992.

== Federal prosecutor ==
Upon graduating from Stanford, Duarte entered the U.S. Attorney General's Honor Program at the federal Department of Justice. During that time, she was a Special Assistant United States Attorney, prosecuting criminal trials at the Superior Court of the District of Columbia.

In 1994, Duarte became an Assistant U.S. Attorney for the Eastern District of California in Sacramento. In 2000, she transferred to the Central District of California, working in the Los Angeles office. In September 2005, the Daily Journal named her one of California's Top 75 female litigators.

== Judicial career ==
Governor Arnold Schwarzenegger appointed Duarte as a Judge of the Los Angeles County Superior Court on March 16, 2007, where she served from April 2007 to June 2008, while she was a resident of Valencia. Fourteen months later on May 16, 2008, he appointed her as a Judge of the Sacramento County Superior Court, where she served from June 2008 to December 2010. On November 23, 2010, he appointed her as an Associate Justice of the California Third District Court of Appeal while she was a resident of El Dorado Hills. She was confirmed to the appellate court on December 10, 2010.

== Adjunct professor ==
Duarte is an adjunct professor at Sacramento's McGeorge School of Law and has previously taught at Stanford Law School, San Francisco Law School, and Santa Clara University School of Law in the San Francisco Bay Area; and at USC Gould School of Law, Loyola Law School, and Southwestern Law School in Los Angeles.

Legal offices
Preceded by Vance W. Raye	Associate Justice of the California; Third District Court of Appeal; December 10, 2010–present	Incumbent
