= Henson Moore =

American politician, attorney and businessman (born 1939)

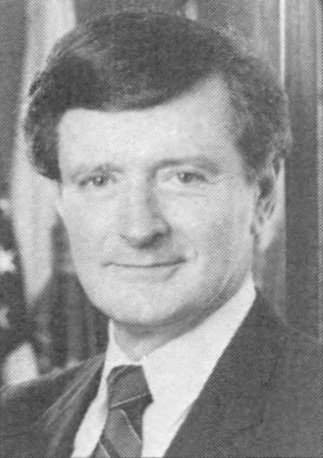

White House Deputy Chief of Staff
- In office February 3, 1992 – August 23, 1992
- President: George H. W. Bush
- Preceded by: Andrew Card
- Succeeded by: Robert Zoellick

7th United States Deputy Secretary of Energy
- In office April 12, 1989 – February 3, 1992
- President: George H. W. Bush
- Preceded by: Joseph F. Salgado
- Succeeded by: Linda Stuntz

Member of the U.S. House of Representatives from Louisiana's 6th district
- In office January 7, 1975 – January 3, 1987
- Preceded by: John Rarick
- Succeeded by: Richard Baker

Personal details
- Born: William Henson Moore III; October 4, 1939 (age 86) Lake Charles, Louisiana, U.S.
- Party: Republican
- Spouse: Carolyn Cherry
- Children: 3
- Education: Louisiana State University (BA, JD, MA)

Military service
- Allegiance: United States
- Branch/service: United States Army
- Years of service: 1965–1967
- Battles/wars: Vietnam War

William Henson Moore III (born October 4, 1939) is an American attorney and businessman. He is a former member of the U.S. House of Representatives, having represented Louisiana's 6th congressional district, based in Baton Rouge, from 1975 to 1987. He was only the second Republican to have represented Louisiana in the House since Reconstruction, the first having been David C. Treen, then of Jefferson Parish.

In 1986, Moore was the unsuccessful Republican candidate in the race to replace the retiring U.S. Senator Russell B. Long. He lost to Democrat John B. Breaux, then of Crowley in Acadia Parish in southwestern Louisiana.

== Early life and education ==
Moore was born in Lake Charles in Calcasieu Parish in southwestern Louisiana, to W.H. Moore, II, an oil company executive, and the former Madge Pearce. The family lived in Hackberry in Cameron Parish and then moved to Baton Rouge, where Moore graduated in 1958 from Baton Rouge High School. In 1957, at the age of seventeen, Moore was elected governor of the Baton Rouge-based Boys State government/citizenship program. In 1961, he received his Bachelor of Arts degree from Louisiana State University in Baton Rouge. In 1965, he obtained his Juris Doctor degree from the Louisiana State University Law Center. He was admitted to the bar in 1966 and the next year joined the Baton Rouge law firm Dale, Woen, Richardson, Taylor, and Mathews, first as an associate and then as a full member. Moore also obtained a master's degree from LSU in 1973.

== Career ==
Moore served in the United States Army from 1965 to 1967. In 1969, he switched party allegiance from Democrat to Republican after having supported Richard M. Nixon in the 1968 general election. He served on the elected Louisiana Republican State Central Committee from 1971 to 1975, when he entered Congress. He was a delegate to the 1984 Republican National Convention in Dallas, which renominated the Reagan-Bush ticket.

=== In Congress ===
Moore was initially elected to the U.S. House of Representatives on November 5, 1974, during mid-term elections that produced huge Democratic gains in both houses of Congress. He succeeded John Richard Rarick of St. Francisville in West Feliciana Parish north of Baton Rouge. Rarick, a Conservative Democrat at odds with his national party leadership, had lost the Democratic runoff primary to Jeff LaCaze, a young liberal former sports broadcaster from Baton Rouge who declared himself a "national Democrat". Moore and LaCaze squared off in the general election. Because Moore's margin over LaCaze was only 14 votes (61,034 to 61,020) and a voting machine had malfunctioned, a special election rematch was directed by the Louisiana courts.

Moore won the special election held on January 7, 1975 with a decisive 74,802 votes (54.1 percent) to LaCaze's 63,366 ballots (45.9 percent). Moore gained 13,768 votes in the second election, while LaCaze netted only an additional 2,346 ballots. Moore fared best in Washington Parish and his parish of residence, East Baton Rouge. He also carried that part of Livingston Parish within the district as well as Tangipahoa Parish. He lost in East Feliciana, St. Helena, and West Feliciana parishes. West Feliciana had been the only parish to support George McGovern for president in 1972. Moore's share of the vote in West Feliciana, a heavily African-American region at the time, was 32.4 percent.

In Congress, Moore compiled a conservative voting record. Early in 1985, he described his political philosophy:

"You can't be all things to all people. People don't want any more taxes. They don't believe that the additional revenue would be applied to the budget. There would be just more money for Congress to spend. ... Taxes alone won't eliminate deficits. ... We've got to start thinking about the survival of the nation. It's not a matter of what is good - it's a matter of what is necessary. ...

Moore stressed in speeches that the longstanding American deficit is financed by foreign capital, whose owners consider the United States a good place in which to invest.

=== 1986 U.S. Senate campaign ===
Moore was the first Republican to run for the United States Senate with party organizational support since 1962, when Taylor W. O'Hearn of Shreveport unsuccessfully challenged Russell Long. He was also the first candidate to declare for Long's seat after the veteran lawmaker announced his retirement effective in January 1987. He had the immediate support of Republican colleague Bob Livingston of First District, who in 1987 launched an unsuccessful bid for governor of Louisiana. Republican chairman George J. Despot of Shreveport pronounced Moore's as his party's "strongest possibility" to fill Long's seat.

Former Governor Dave Treen at first indicated that he too might run for the Senate, but within a month endorsed Moore. Treen noted that all states on the Gulf of Mexico had at least one Republican senator at the time except for Louisiana. Also strongly for Moore was his friend Frank Spooner, the outgoing Republican national committeeman and an oil and natural gas producer in Monroe, who had lost the 1976 race for Louisiana's 5th congressional district to the Democrat Jerry Huckaby.

In this campaign, Moore sounded more like a candidate for governor than for the U.S. Senate, having consistently claimed that Louisiana needed "a new image". He specifically called for greater job opportunities, expanded port facilities and exports, more emphasis on tourism, and the designation of a research hospital in Louisiana. "We're going to have to use our business and commercial leaders to turn it around. Don't depend on politicians," Moore said. Moore called for placing offshore revenues into a trust fund to support education. He demanded protection of American business from unfair foreign trade practices.

In the nonpartisan blanket primary, Moore led fellow Representative John Breaux of Louisiana's 7th congressional district, since disbanded, with 529,433 votes (44.2 percent) to 447,328 (37.3 percent).

In the general election, Breaux turned the tables on Moore: 723,586 (52.8 percent) to 646,311 (47.2 percent), a margin of 77,275 ballots. Nationally, the Democrats regained control of the Senate for the two remaining years of the Reagan administration. Breaux held the Senate seat for eighteen years, when he was succeeded by David Vitter, the first Republican U.S. senator from the state since Reconstruction.

To run for the seat Long vacated, Moore had to relinquish his House seat. Moore's seat was won in 1986 by a fellow Republican, State Representative Richard H. Baker, then of Baker, a town north of Baton Rouge in East Baton Rouge Parish. Baker held the seat until 2008, when he resigned to become a lobbyist.

=== Post-congressional years ===
After his House service, U.S. President Ronald Reagan named Moore commissioner of the Panama Canal Consultative Committee (1987–1989). In April 1989, he became deputy secretary of the United States Department of Energy, having been sworn into that position by then Vice President Dan Quayle. In 1992, Moore became White House Deputy Chief of Staff for U.S. President George Herbert Walker Bush during Bush's last year in office.

After his service in the first Bush administration, Moore was until 1995 a partner in the Texas and New York-based law firm of Bracewell & Giuliani (includes senior partner Rudolph W. Giuliani). Afterwards, he was the president and CEO of the interest group, the American Forest and Paper Association and then the president of the International Council of Forest and Paper Associations. Both positions involved considerable lobbying. Moore retired in 2007, and he and his wife, the former Carolyn Cherry, built a new home in Baton Rouge. The Moores met in Baton Rouge in May 1960 at the second inauguration of Louisiana Governor Jimmie Davis. The couple has three children, W. H. Moore, IV, Jennifer Lee Moore, and Cherry Ann Moore.

Moore serves on the boards of directors of the American Council for Capital Formation and the United States - New Zealand Council. He is a member of the American Legion and Rotary International. He is Episcopalian and a member of Trinity Episcopal Church in Baton Rouge.

In 2002, Moore was inducted into the Louisiana Political Museum and Hall of Fame in Winnfield.

In 2005, he accepted chairmanship of Forever LSU: The Campaign for Louisiana State University. His involvement – as spokesman and fundraiser – made a huge difference for his alma mater, future generations of students and faculty, and for Louisiana. Thanks to his leadership, the campaign reached and exceeded its $750 million goal.

On April 1, 2011, Moore was honored as the 2011 Alumnus of the Year as part of the LSU Alumni Association's Hall of Distinction. It was Moore's second time to be honored by the association; he was also inducted to the hall in 1991.

U.S. House of Representatives
Preceded by John Rarick	Member of the U.S. House of Representatives from Louisiana's 6th congressional district 1975–1987	Succeeded by Richard Baker
Party political offices
Vacant Title last held by Taylor O'Hearn; 1962	Republican nominee for U.S. Senator from Louisiana (Class 3); 1986	Vacant Title next held by Jim Donelon
U.S. order of precedence (ceremonial)
Preceded by Brad Wenstrup as Former U.S. Representative	Order of precedence of the United States as Former U.S. Representative	Succeeded by Charles Boustany as Former U.S. Representative
