= Joseph F. Salgado =

American lawyer and deputy secretary of energy (born 1943)

Joseph Salgado

7th United States Deputy Secretary of Energy
- In office May 21, 1988 – January 20, 1989
- President: Ronald Reagan
- Preceded by: William Flynn Martin
- Succeeded by: Henson Moore

Personal details
- Born: January 10, 1943 (age 82) San Diego, California, U.S.
- Education: University of San Francisco (BS); San Francisco Law School (JD)

Joseph F. Salgado (born January 10, 1943) is an American lawyer who served as the 7th United States deputy secretary of energy from May 1988 to January 1989.

== Early life and education ==
Salgado was born in San Diego in 1943. He earned a Bachelor of Science degree from the University of San Francisco in 1968 and a Juris Doctor from the San Francisco Law School in 1972.

== Career ==
From 1966 to 1973, Salgado served as a sergeant in the Oakland Police Department. From 1973 to 1983, he served in the Office of the Alameda County District Attorney as a deputy district attorney and senior trial attorney. Salgado joined the Reagan administration in 1982, serving as associate commissioner of the Immigration and Naturalization Service for enforcement. From 1983 to 1985, Salgado served as associate director of the White House Presidential Personnel Office. From 1985 to 1988, Salgado served as under secretary of energy, succeeding William Patrick Collins. He served as deputy secretary from 1988 to 1989.
