= Boyce F. Martin Jr. =

American judge (1935–2016)

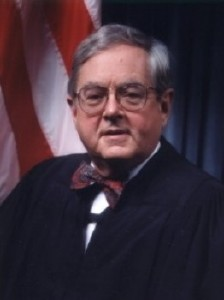

Chief Judge of the United States Court of Appeals for the Sixth Circuit
- In office October 1, 1996 – September 30, 2003
- Preceded by: Gilbert S. Merritt Jr.
- Succeeded by: Danny Julian Boggs

Judge of the United States Court of Appeals for the Sixth Circuit
- In office September 26, 1979 – August 16, 2013
- Appointed by: Jimmy Carter
- Preceded by: Seat established by 92 Stat. 1629
- Succeeded by: Amul Thapar

Personal details
- Born: Boyce Ficklen Martin Jr. October 23, 1935 Boston, Massachusetts, U.S.
- Died: June 1, 2016 (aged 80) Louisville, Kentucky, U.S.
- Education: Davidson College (AB); University of Virginia (JD)

Boyce Ficklen Martin Jr. (October 23, 1935 – June 1, 2016) was a United States circuit judge of the United States Court of Appeals for the Sixth Circuit. Appointed by President Jimmy Carter in 1979, Martin served as chief judge of the circuit from 1996 to 2003 and wrote more than 1,100 opinions during his 34-year tenure. Martin lived in Louisville, Kentucky.

== Early career ==
Born in Boston, Massachusetts, Martin received an Artium Baccalaureus degree from Davidson College in 1957. After graduating, he first worked in banking. Later, while serving in the United States Army Reserve, he went to the University of Virginia School of Law and received his Juris Doctor in 1963. Immediately after graduation he served as a law clerk to Shackelford Miller Jr., then Chief Judge of the Sixth Circuit – a position he would later hold himself. In 1964 and 1965, Martin served first as an Assistant United States Attorney, and then as the United States Attorney for the Western District of Kentucky. He left for private practice in Louisville, Kentucky for a short time, but was soon appointed by Kentucky Governor Wendell Ford to fill a judicial vacancy on the Jefferson County Circuit Court in early 1974.

In the November 1974 elections he was endorsed by the Louisville Courier-Journal which praised him for his "innate fairness, temperament, experience, and training necessary to become an outstanding circuit judge." He won by a landslide.

== Kentucky judicial reform efforts ==
In the 1970s, Martin worked behind the scenes lobbying to reform the Kentucky judiciary. The Kentucky court system had been little changed since 1850, and it had a host of problems. "Kentucky had a multiplicity of misdemeanor courts that were presided over, for the most part, by non-lawyer judges. There were county courts, magistrate courts, municipal courts, and police courts. It was not uncommon for the judges of these courts to be totally untrained in the law, politically partisan, and, in some cases, of dubious literacy."

Appeals from these courts went to the Kentucky Court of Appeals whose decisions were of high quality, but could take two or three years to be handed down. The reform efforts bore fruit on November 4, 1975, when an amendment to the state constitution was passed by 54%. The amendment cleared the way to create a unified court system with a new intermediate Court of Appeals and the Kentucky Supreme Court replacing the old highest court.

As a reformer and the first Chief Judge of the newly created Court of Appeals, Martin quickly got the new court off the ground and cleared the backlog of cases that had developed under the old system.

Martin's goals at the time were to speed up the appellate process, reduce cost, and create an efficient chain of justice, while maintaining a high level of conscientious decision-making. These goals were accomplished and the Court of Appeals was generally viewed as an unequivocal success.

== Federal judicial service ==
On June 5, 1979, Martin was nominated by President Jimmy Carter to a new seat on the United States Court of Appeals for the Sixth Circuit created by 92 Stat. 1629. He was confirmed by the United States Senate on September 25, 1979, and received his commission the following day. He served as Chief Judge of the Sixth Circuit from October 1, 1996, until September 30, 2003. During his tenure as Chief Judge he steered the circuit through a turbulent period when up to seven of the sixteen judgeships were vacant due to an impasse between Congress and the president over judicial nominations.

Martin's style both on the bench and in written opinions was characterized by "no-nonsense jurisprudence," clear and concise writing, and a focus on common sense. He was cited as an example of how common sense helps "sustain the law, not destroy it." In his opinion, the purpose of an opinion is to "provide justice to the parties and explain the law to the lawyers and the public". To this end, he quickly published opinions so that the disputing parties need not wait longer than necessary. He was also known to liven his opinions with the occasional quote about ostriches or Homer Simpson.

Martin retired from the federal bench on August 16, 2013.

== Selected opinions ==
=== Death penalty ===
Martin wrote forcefully about what he perceived to be the many failures in the American system of capital punishment. In one case involving a debate regarding a jury's decision to sentence a defendant to death while a co-conspirator was not sentenced to death, Martin dissented from the majority that held that the principle of proportionality did not apply. He wrote,

Jason Getsy and John Santine are not hypothetical players in a criminal law final exam. They are real people who committed real crimes, indeed, the same crimes. That Getsy will be put to death while Santine will be spared, and that the law (at least according to the majority) actually sanctions this result, makes it virtually impossible for me to answer in the affirmative what Justice Blackmun viewed as the fundamental question in Callins v. Collins. -namely, does our system of capital punishment "accurately and consistently determine" which defendants "deserve" to die and which do not? Getsy v. Mitchell. "This state of affairs I find unconscionable, even as I remain bound to apply the laws of this court and of the Supreme Court." Id.

In a much-noted dissent in Moore v. Parker (2005), Martin forcefully objected to the current administration of the death penalty:

I have been a judge on this Court for more than twenty-five years. In that time I have seen many death penalty cases and I have applied the law as instructed by the Supreme Court and I will continue to do so for as long as I remain on this Court. This my oath requires. After all these years, however, only one conclusion is possible: the death penalty in this country is arbitrary, biased, and so fundamentally flawed at its very core that it is beyond repair.

After discussing many of the studies and cases that have noted the numerous flaws in our system, he concluded,

As noted above, while the system suffers from many flaws, much of the arbitrary imposition of the death penalty stems from the exceedingly distressing fact that during all my years on the bench, the quality of lawyering that capital defendants receive has not substantially improved. In many cases it has deteriorated. In fact, one of the most clear examples of the arbitrariness of the death penalty is the common knowledge that those defendants with decent lawyers rarely get sentenced to death. Death has more to do with extra-judicial factors like race and socio-economic status than with whether death is deserved. A system, whose basic justification is the interest in retribution and general deterrence, is not served when guided by such irrelevant factors. Nor should a system of life and death hinge on the proficiency of counsel. I have no delusions of grandeur and I know my place in the judiciary. My oath requires me to apply the law as interpreted by the Supreme Court of the United States. I will continue to do as I am told until the Supreme Court concludes that the death penalty cannot be administered in a constitutional manner or our legislatures abolish the penalty. But lest there be any doubt, the idea that the death penalty is fairly and rationally imposed in this country is a farce.

=== Affirmative action ===
Martin authored the affirmative action case Grutter v. Bollinger (2003), which held that the University of Michigan Law School could take into account an applicant's race in making admission decisions. Grutter and its sister case, Gratz v. Bollinger, which challenged the University of Michigan's undergraduate affirmative action plan, eventually were appealed to the United States Supreme Court. The Supreme Court affirmed Grutter and the Law School's affirmative action plan, while reversing Gratz and finding the undergraduate plan unconstitutional.

The Grutter case was surrounded in controversy. Conservative judges on the Sixth Circuit claimed that then-Chief Judge Martin had improperly steered the case to a more liberal panel. They also claimed the en banc review of the case was tainted because it was delayed until two conservative judges of the Sixth Circuit had retired, giving the court a liberal majority. Judge Danny Julian Boggs took the unprecedented step of filing a "Procedural Appendix" as part of his dissent from Grutter, in which he explicitly accused Martin and the rest of the majority of improperly tampering with the case. The majority took umbrage with Judge Boggs' decision to publish this appendix, with Judge Karen Nelson Moore noting that Boggs had not raised any complaint with the composition of the en banc court when the en banc petition was circulated or when the case was argued before the en banc court, suggesting that Boggs's dispute was with the outcome of the case, rather than the procedures of the court.

However, such a complaint could have been characterized as an ex ante attempt to influence the outcome of the case by manipulating the composition of the en banc panel, the very problem Boggs alleged. The Judicial Watch foundation filed a formal complaint with the court alleging administrative improprieties, and subsequently wrote a complaining letter to Congressman James Sensenbrenner of the U.S. House Judiciary Committee requesting an impeachment investigation.

The handling of the complaint itself was reviewed by the Judicial Conduct and Disability Act Study Committee (the "Breyer Committee"), which reviewed how complaints were being handled under the Judicial Conduct and Disability Act of 1980. The Breyer Committee report observed that the internal investigation into Martin's alleged actions in handling the Grutter case was flawed by the acting chief judge's decision to make certain findings of fact as "undisputed" without asking Martin whether he disputed them (although the report agreed that certain of the findings, such as dates and the sequence of events, were truly undisputed).

In this respect, the report found that the investigation was conducted in a manner inconsistent with the letter and spirit of the court's rules. At the same time, however, the report took issue with the acting chief judge's decision to drop the complaint due to "corrective action". The committee considered this an insufficient remedy as the Act requires the corrective action be "voluntary action taken by the subject judge", and Martin "did not participate in taking the corrective action". Relations between conservative and liberal members of the Sixth Circuit reportedly remain strained.

== Judicial complaint - investigation into improper travel expenses ==
In January 2014, nearly six months after Judge Martin's retirement from the federal judiciary, allegations surrounding government-reimbursed travel expenses were referred to the U.S. Justice Department, according to an opinion by the Committee on Judicial Conduct and Disability of the U.S. Judicial Conference.

The case was significant because complaints against federal judges are rarely made public, and most do not result in disciplinary action. Referrals to the Department of Justice, which conducts criminal investigations, are rare. The Chief Judge of the Sixth Circuit Court of Appeals, Alice M. Batchelder, made the initial complaint. She and fellow conservatives on the court had battled Judge Martin and ideological allies of his for years, leading some to claim the charges may have been politically motivated.

In May 2013, he agreed to pay back all of his $138,500 worth of travel expenses over the contested time period, despite the fact that only a portion of those expenses were alleged to be improper. Judge Martin contested some of the expenses and conceded mistakes with others, but offered to repay the entire amount to conclude the matter. According to an affidavit by Martin's lawyer, outside counsel for the special committee had suggested his resignation and payment of the money would "conclude the matter and it would remain confidential." But the judicial conduct committee opinion says those statements represented only advice or suggestions on how Martin could improve his legal position rather than a promise.

In March 2014, the Justice Department notified Judge Martin that it had completed its review and would not be pursuing the matter.

== Death ==
Martin died at his home in Louisville from brain cancer on June 1, 2016, aged 80.

== See also ==
- List of United States federal judges by longevity of service

== Sources ==
Legal offices
Preceded by Seat established by 92 Stat. 1629	Judge of the United States Court of Appeals for the Sixth Circuit; 1979–2013	Succeeded by Amul Thapar
Preceded by Gilbert S. Merritt Jr.	Chief Judge of the United States Court of Appeals for the Sixth Circuit; 1996–2003	Succeeded by Danny Julian Boggs
