= Danny Julian Boggs =

American judge and lawyer (born 1944)

Danny Boggs
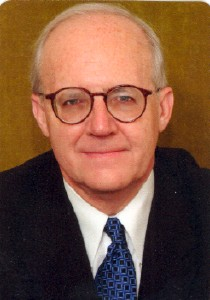

Senior Judge of the United States Court of Appeals for the Sixth Circuit
- Incumbent
- Assumed office February 28, 2017

Chief Judge of the United States Court of Appeals for the Sixth Circuit
- In office September 30, 2003 – August 14, 2009
- Preceded by: Boyce F. Martin Jr.
- Succeeded by: Alice M. Batchelder

Judge of the United States Court of Appeals for the Sixth Circuit
- In office March 25, 1986 – February 28, 2017
- Appointed by: Ronald Reagan
- Preceded by: Seat established
- Succeeded by: John K. Bush

United States Deputy Secretary of Energy
- In office November 3, 1983 – March 25, 1986
- President: Ronald Reagan
- Preceded by: W. Kenneth Davis
- Succeeded by: William Flynn Martin

Personal details
- Born: Danny Julian Boggs; October 23, 1944 (age 81) Havana, Cuba
- Education: Harvard University (BA); University of Chicago (JD)

Danny Julian Boggs (born October 23, 1944) is an American lawyer and a senior United States circuit judge of the United States Court of Appeals for the Sixth Circuit. He was appointed to the court in 1986 and served as its chief judge from September 2003 to August 2009. Boggs was on the short list of President George W. Bush's candidates for the U.S. Supreme Court.

== Early life and education ==
Born in Havana, Cuba, and raised in Bowling Green, Kentucky, Boggs attended College High School in Bowling Green, where he was a member of the debate team that won the 1959 Kentucky state debate championship. He received an Artium Baccalaureus (Bachelor of Arts) degree cum laude from Harvard University in 1965 and graduated from the University of Chicago Law School in 1968 with a J.D. degree and a nomination to the Order of the Coif. At the University of Chicago, he won the Hinton Moot Court Competition and was an editor of the University of Chicago Law Review.

== Career ==
Boggs began his career with an academic position as a Bigelow Fellow and instructor at the University of Chicago Law School from 1968 to 1969. Later, he served in a variety of roles in Kentucky state government: first as the deputy commissioner of the Kentucky Department for Economic Security at the state capitol in Frankfort, Kentucky from 1969 to 1970; then as legal counsel and administrative assistant to Governor Louie Nunn of Kentucky from 1970 to 1971; as legislative counsel and assistant to the minority leader of the Kentucky State House of Representatives in 1972; as an attorney for the Kentucky Republican Campaign in 1972; and as deputy campaign director for the Nunn for Governor Campaign in Louisville in 1979.

When not serving in the state or federal government, Boggs engaged in private practice in Frankfort, Kentucky, in Bowling Green, Kentucky, and from 1979 to 1981 in Washington, D.C.

Boggs started a career in federal government as an attorney for the United States Department of Commerce in 1973. From 1973 to 1975, he served as assistant to United States Solicitor General Robert Bork, alongside future Chief Judge of the United States Court of Appeals for the Seventh Circuit Frank Easterbrook and future secretary of labor in the Clinton administration Robert Reich. Under Ronald Reagan, Boggs served as special assistant to the President in the Executive Office of the President from 1981 to 1983.

Prior to his judicial appointment, Boggs served with distinction in senior positions in the energy sector: first as assistant to the Chairman of the Federal Power Commission from 1975 to 1977; then as deputy minority counsel for the United States Senate Committee on Energy and Natural Resources from 1977 to 1979. Following his appointment as special assistant to the President in the Executive Office of the President, Boggs served in the Reagan administration as Deputy Secretary of the United States Department of Energy from 1983 to 1986. He received the Department of Energy Secretary's Gold Medal.

== Federal judicial service ==
=== Nomination and judicial career ===
On January 29, 1986, Boggs was nominated by President Ronald Reagan to the United States Court of Appeals for the Sixth Circuit (Cincinnati, Ohio) to take a new seat authorized by 98 Stat. 333. He was confirmed by the United States Senate on March 3, 1986, and received his commission on March 25, 1986. From 2003 to 2009, Boggs served as Chief Judge of the Sixth Circuit. During his judicial career, he was variously Secretary, Vice-Chair, and Chair of the Appellate Judges Conference of the American Bar Association from 2001 to 2002 and a member of the Judicial Conference of the United States from 2003 to 2009. Boggs was on the short list of President George W. Bush's candidates for the U.S. Supreme Court. He assumed senior status on February 28, 2017.

In 2006, Senator Mitch McConnell (R-KY) delivered on the Senate floor a tribute to Boggs to commemorate his 20-year anniversary on the federal bench, calling Judge Boggs "a Kentuckian who is one of the finest legal scholars of his generation," "a true Renaissance man" with a "fertile, polymath's mind," "[w]ell-read in history, geography, literature, mathematics, and political science," who "not only does … voraciously ingest knowledge, he loves to share it with others." McConnell also noted that "Judge Boggs delights in hiring clerks of any and all political persuasions, as long as they have a keen mind and are always ready for debate. Of course, these poor clerks know that Judge Boggs will almost always win."

On the occasion of Judge Boggs's 30th anniversary on the bench, Chief Justice Roberts wrote in a congratulatory letter: "The Nation has benefitted immeasurably from your intellect and judgment. We in the Judiciary admire your devotion to the cause of justice. We enjoy the precision of your writing. And we are forever grateful that our employment does not depend on our answers to the quizzes you give your prospective law clerks."

=== Notable cases ===
==== Grutter v. Bollinger ====
288 F.3d 732 (6th Cir. 2002), aff'd, 539 U.S. 306 (2003). The University of Michigan Law School appealed a district court's decision that the law school's consideration of race and ethnicity in its admissions decisions violated the Equal Protection Clause of the Fourteenth Amendment and Title VI of the Civil Rights Act. The divided Sixth Circuit, sitting en banc, reversed five to four in an opinion written by Chief Judge Boyce F. Martin Jr., which held that the Law School's admissions policy was narrowly tailored to serve its compelling interest in achieving a diverse student body, and that its policy was therefore valid. Judge Boggs dissented, stating that the racial discrimination applied in the admissions policy of the law school would not pass even the slightest scrutiny, that the Law School's efforts to achieve a "critical mass" are functionally indistinguishable from an unconstitutional numerical quota for minorities, and that the majority opinion's analysis relying on the obscenity case Marks v. United States, 430 U.S. 188 (1977) was flawed. On the merits, Judge Boggs disclosed in his dissent the magnitude of racial preferences granted in University of Michigan Law School's admissions by analyzing its admissions data from the record. Judge Boggs concluded that constructing a diverse educational environment was not a compelling state interest, because the nature and benefits of the experiential diversity that the Law School claimed to seek were conceptually disconnected from the racial and ethnic diversity that it primarily sought, and because the Law School's concept of diversity permitted no logical limitation and threatened to justify even more constitutionally unacceptable outcomes. Judge Boggs also included in his dissent a Procedural Appendix, detailing the procedural history of the case in the Sixth Circuit and the procedural manipulations by then-Chief Judge Boyce F. Martin Jr., who had violated Sixth Circuit procedural rules by assigning himself to this and other panels and by withholding from the full court an en banc petition for five months, until a time when the court had achieved a Democrat-appointed majority of active judges to assure an ideology-based outcome of the case.

The Supreme Court affirmed in a five to four split decision with three separate concurrences in part and with two dissents. Grutter v. Bollinger, 539 U.S. 306 (2003).

Writing for the majority, Justice O'Connor held that the Law School had a compelling interest in attaining a diverse student body and that its admissions program was narrowly tailored to serve its compelling interest in obtaining the educational benefits that flow from a diverse student body, and thus did not violate the Equal Protection Clause. Justices Thomas and Scalia concurred in part and dissented in part.

Justice Thomas concluded that Michigan did not have a compelling interest in maintaining a public law school and certainly not an elite law school, and that marginal improvements in legal education did not qualify as a compelling state interest. Chief Justice Rehnquist, in his dissent, agreed with Judge Boggs's argument that the Law School's program bears little or no relation to its asserted goal of achieving "critical mass".

Analyzing admissions data, he noted that the Law School afforded preferential treatment to African American applicants but not to Hispanic or Native American candidates, failing to attempt to achieve any "critical mass" for these minority applicants, and failing to satisfy strict scrutiny analysis. Justice Kennedy's dissent provided his own analysis of the admissions data to prove similar points that the Law School's admissions program was tantamount to an unconstitutional quota for African American applicants, and that it had failed strict scrutiny.

==== Coalition to Defend Affirmative Action, Integration & Immigration Rights v. Regents of the University of Michigan ====
701 F.3d 466 (6th Cir. 2012). The Sixth Circuit held en banc that a successful voter-initiated amendment to the Michigan Constitution prohibiting, in relevant part, Michigan's public colleges and universities from using affirmative action in its admissions, violated the Equal Protection Clause. The amendment provided that the State of Michigan and its public school system "shall not discriminate against, or grant preferential treatment to, any individual or group on the basis of race, sex, color, ethnicity, or national origin in the operation of public employment, public education, or public contracting." 701 F.3d 466, 471 (6th Cir. 2012). Judge Boggs dissented, stating that the majority opinion relied on an extreme extension of existing precedent to arrive at the result that an otherwise laudable initiative of the people of the State of Michigan was now declared unconstitutional. The majority opinion, Judge Boggs contended, led to an outcome prohibiting the State of Michigan from making any changes to the educational or employment policies relating to affirmative action, and such changes could now only be effected by the educational authorities of individual state, regional and local educational institutions. Because such governing authorities are variously elected or appointed for terms of several years, a candidate attempting to challenge a racially discriminatory admissions or employment policy would have to proceed in a large number of individual political and election campaigns all across Michigan. To solidify this point, Judge Boggs gave an example of a mixed-race applicant, whose ethnic origins would allow different racial categorizations by school administrators, resulting in discrimination for or against such candidate as permitted under existing precedent: one-half Chinese, one-fourth Eastern–European Jewish, one-eighth Hispanic (Cuban), and one-eighth general North European, mostly Scots–Irish. The dissent further argued that disallowing the State's adoption of a unified policy prohibiting racial discrimination would require that such a candidate challenge school policies individually. The Supreme Court reversed the full Sixth Circuit, holding that no authority in the United States Constitution would allow the Judiciary to set aside an amendment to the Michigan Constitution that prohibits affirmative action in public education, employment, and contracting. Schuette v. Coalition to Defend Affirmative Action, Integration & Immigrant Rights & Fight for Equality By Any Means Necessary (BAMN), 572 U.S. 291 (2014). The Supreme Court explained at length that the Sixth Circuit's extension of existing precedent was flawed and led to a mistaken conclusion. Justice Scalia's concurrence pointedly summarized the result of Sixth Circuit's holding: "It has come to this. Called upon to explore the jurisprudential twilight zone between two errant lines of precedent, we confront a frighteningly bizarre question: Does the Equal Protection Clause of the Fourteenth Amendment forbid what its text plainly requires?" 572 U.S. 291, 316 (2014).

==== Monasky v. Taglieri ====
876 F.3d 868 (6th Cir. 2017). In this rare case dealing with a petition for return of a child under the Hague Convention on the Civil Aspects of International Child Abduction and its implementing statute, the International Child Abduction Remedies Act (ICARA), Judge Boggs, writing for the panel, held that because the child had resided exclusively in a single country, that country is the child's "habitual residence" under the Hague Convention and ICARA, and that the father was exercising valid custody rights to his child under Italian law when the mother removed the child to the United States. The mother failed to demonstrate a grave risk of harm to the child if the child was returned to Italy and, thus, did not satisfy an exception to the requirement under both the Hague Convention and ICARA that a child wrongfully removed from habitual residence be promptly returned. On rehearing en banc, the Court of Appeals affirmed, and Judge Boggs wrote a concurring opinion adhering to the reasoning of his three-judge panel majority opinion. 907 F.3d 404. Certiorari was granted, and the Supreme Court unanimously affirmed, quoting Judge Boggs's en banc concurrence ("[A]bsent unusual circumstances, where a child has resided exclusively in a single country, especially with both parents, that country is the child's habitual residence."). The Supreme Court held that an actual agreement between the parents on where to raise a child is not necessary to establish the child's habitual residence, and courts should use deferential clear-error review to determine habitual residence under the Hague Convention. Justice Ginsburg wrote the majority opinion while Justices Thomas and Alito concurred in part and concurred in the judgment. Monasky v. Taglieri, 140 S. Ct. 719 (2020).

==== International Outdoor, Inc. v. City of Troy, Michigan ====
974 F.3d 690 (6th Cir. 2020). In this case concerning the constitutionality of a local ordinance brought by a billboard company, Judge Boggs followed a long history of his jurisprudence on First Amendment challenges to regulations of signage and advertising. Writing for the majority, he held that the city ordinance regulating signs and billboards imposed a content-based restriction that is subject to strict scrutiny under the First Amendment. Disagreeing with holdings by a few other circuits, Judge Boggs wrote that the Supreme Court precedent in Reed v. Town of Gilbert, Ariz., 135 S. Ct. 2218 (2015) rather than Central Hudson Gas & Electric Corp. v. Public Service Commission, 447 U.S. 557 (1980), applied, as confirmed in the Supreme Court's more recent ruling in Barr v. American Association of Political Consultants, 140 S. Ct. 2335 (2020), requiring the application of strict rather than intermediate scrutiny to content-based restrictions on commercial speech. The dissent did not address the standard of judicial review but instead concluded that the plaintiffs lacked standing to bring a challenge of the ordinance in the first place.

==== Discovery Network, Inc. v. City of Cincinnati ====
946 F.2d 464 (6th Cir. 1991). In this First Amendment opinion, Judge Boggs, writing for the panel, held that a city may not ban all "commercial" publications from distributing copies through public news boxes, while allowing "non-commercial" conventional newspapers to do so. The Supreme Court affirmed. 507 U.S. 410 (1993).

==== Tyler v. Hillsdale County Sheriff's Department ====
837 F.3d 678 (6th Cir. 2016). A prospective gun purchaser, who had been involuntarily committed to mental institution for less than one month 28 years earlier, brought an action seeking declaratory judgment that a federal statute prohibiting individuals who had been committed to mental institution from possessing a firearm was unconstitutional as applied to him. Judge Boggs reversed the district court's dismissal of the complaint, holding that, as matter of first impression, strict scrutiny, rather than intermediate scrutiny, would apply, that the statute furthered compelling interests, but that the prospective purchaser has stated claim that the statute violated the Second Amendment as applied to him. 775 F.3d 308 (2014). Later, the en banc court also reversed the district court's dismissal, holding that the plaintiff had stated a plausible claim that his permanent disarmament violated his Second Amendment rights, although the full court did so by applying intermediate rather than strict scrutiny. 837 F.3d 678 (6th Cir. 2016). Judge Boggs filed an opinion concurring in part, stating that under Sixth Circuit precedent that was not specifically overruled by the majority opinion, the applicable level of scrutiny was strict scrutiny, as with other fundamental constitutional rights, and under that standard of review, the district court should be reversed.

==== Williams v. Toyota Motor Manufacturing, Kentucky, Inc. ====
224 F.3d 840 (6th Cir. 2000). Judge Boggs dissented from a panel decision holding that a plaintiff was disabled under the Americans with Disabilities Act because she could not perform a broad class of manual tasks. The Supreme Court reversed the panel's decision. 534 U.S. 184 (2002).

==== Bowles v. Russell ====
432 F.2d 668 (2005). The Sixth Circuit opinion written by Judge Boggs held that a district judge could not extend the time for filing an appeal under Federal Rule of Appellate Procedure 4(a)(6) even when the judge had mistakenly advised counsel that more time was allowed. The Supreme Court affirmed this ruling. 551 U.S. 205 (2007).

== Circuit conflict ==
Boggs sparked controversy in 2001 by accusing then-Chief Judge Boyce F. Martin Jr. of violating Sixth Circuit procedural rules by assigning himself to panels, withholding from the full court information about en banc petitions, and manipulating the timing of orders. The procedural manipulations affected the outcome of two major cases: Grutter v. Bollinger, an affirmative action case against the University of Michigan Law School, and In re Byrd, 269 F.3d 585 (6th Cir. 2001), a death penalty case. In both of these en banc cases Judge Boggs wrote a dissent that included a detailed description of the procedural irregularities involved. Judicial Watch, a conservative group, filed a judicial misconduct complaint against Judge Boyce Martin regarding the same matter. Judge Boggs recused himself from the subsequent panel inquiry, which found a rule violation by Judge Martin but recommended no action in light of changed procedural circuit rules and internal reforms since implemented at the court.

== Judicial style and clerks ==
One unusual feature of Judge Boggs's managing style is a general knowledge quiz he gives to clerkship applicants. The quiz strongly emphasizes history, geography, literature, and classics. Judge Boggs said that he uses the answers to gain insight into potential clerks' interests and personalities. Three of his former clerks appeared on the ABC game show Who Wants to Be a Millionaire at the peak of the show's popularity in 2001, and two of them used him as their "phone-a-friend". Boggs's other clerks went on to become White House Counsel (Pat Cipollone), Director of National Intelligence in the Biden administration (Avril Haines), and Chairman of the Federal Energy Regulatory Commission (James Danly).

== Other activities ==
Boggs was a member of the Visiting Committee of the University of Chicago Law School from 1986 to 1989 and from 1999 to 2002. He is a Counselor at Brandeis American Inn of Court and a member of the Mont Pèlerin Society.

== Publications ==
- "Foreign Policy: A Redefinition in the Singular", The Harvard Conservative, Sept. 1964;
- "Analysis of 1964 Election", The Harvard Conservative, Jan. 1965;
- "Reagan Energy Policy", The New York Times, May 1, 1982;
- "The Energy Picture: A Mid-Term Assessment", San Angelo Standard Times, Oct. 1982;
- "When Governments Forecast", Futures, Oct. 1985;
- "A Judicial Perspective," Banbury Report 32;
- "Science and Technology Advice in the Judiciary," Chapter in Science and Technology Advice to the President, Congress, and Judiciary, (ed. by William T. Golden, Pergamon Press, 1988);
- "Comment on Donohue," 54 Law and Contemporary Problems 223 (1991);
- "Comment on the Paper by Professor O'Neill," 21 Capital U. L. Rev. 593 (1992);
- "A Differing View on Viewpoint Discrimination," 1993 U. Chicago Legal Forum 45;
- "The Right to a Fair Trial," 1998 U. Chicago Legal Forum;
- "Reining in Judges: The Case of Hate Speech," 52 SMU L. Rev. 271 (1999);
- "Unpublished Opinions and the Nature of Precedent," 4 Green Bag 17 (2000) (co-authored with Brian P. Brooks);
- "Obstacles and Opportunities in LNG Siting," 2 Envt'l & Energy L. & Pol'y J. 117 (2007).

== See also ==
- George W. Bush Supreme Court candidates
- List of United States federal judges by longevity of service

Political offices
Preceded by W. Kenneth Davis	United States Deputy Secretary of Energy; 1983–1986	Succeeded by William Flynn Martin
Legal offices
New seat	Judge of the United States Court of Appeals for the Sixth Circuit; 1986–2017	Succeeded by John K. Bush
Preceded by Boyce F. Martin Jr.	Chief Judge of the United States Court of Appeals for the Sixth Circuit; 2003–2009	Succeeded by Alice M. Batchelder
