= Stephanie Lin =

American TV news anchor

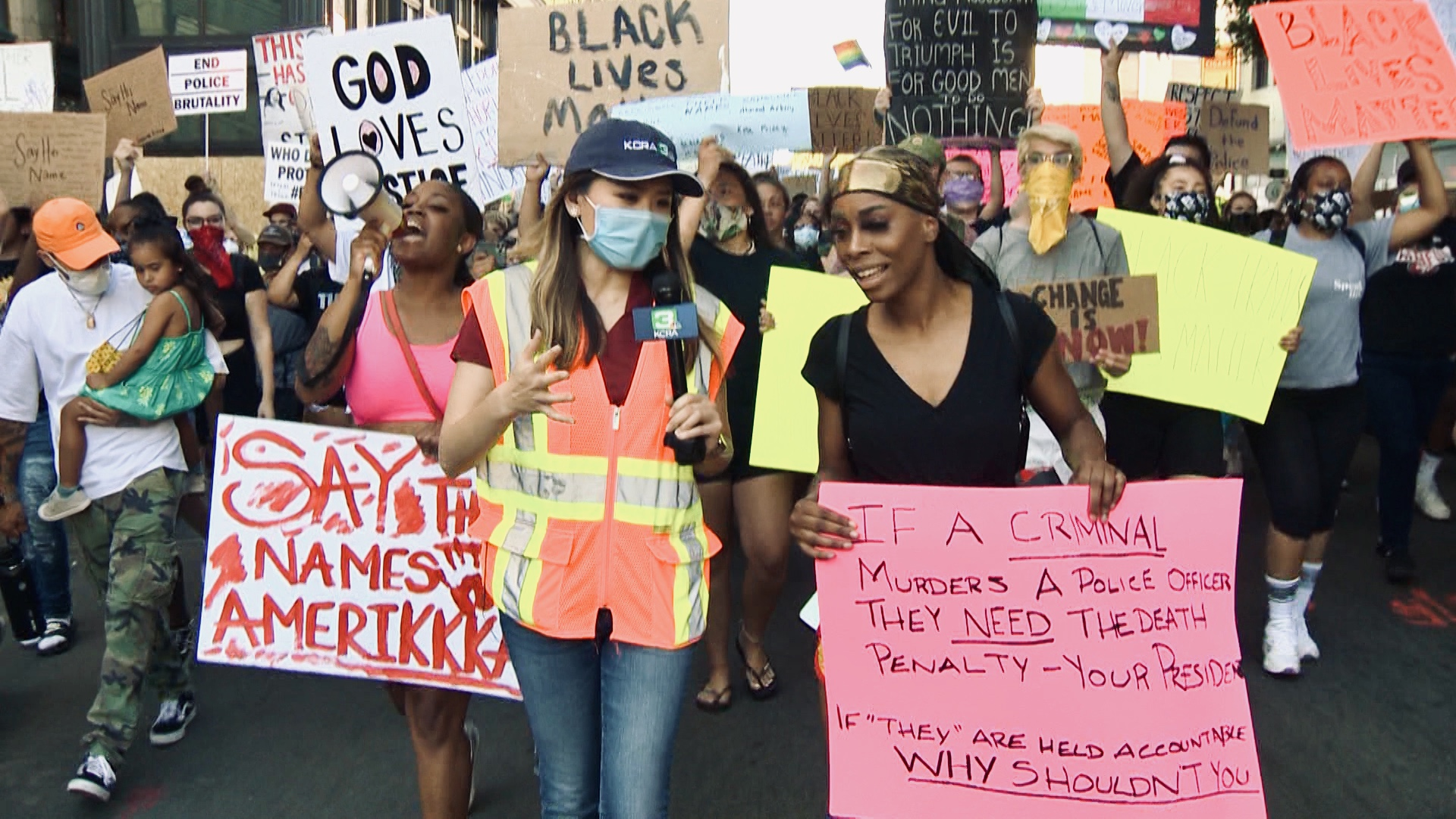
- Lin covering protests in 2020
- Born: October 18; Mountain View, California, U.S.
- Education: University of California, Berkeley (BA)
- Occupations: Broadcast Journalist
- Years active: 2008–present

Stephanie Lin (Chinese: 林奕帆; pinyin: lín yì fan) is an American news anchor working with KRON-TV in San Francisco, California. Lin is recognized by the Associated Press Television and Radio Association for her work reporting from the frontlines of California's deadliest wildfire.

== Early life and education ==
The daughter of Taiwanese immigrants, Lin was born in Mountain View, California, on October 18. She received a B.A. in mass communications and a minor in Chinese from the University of California, Berkeley. While in college, Lin reported for KALX Radio and the online TV station, CalTV. She was awarded scholarships from the East Bay Press Club, the Cal Alumni Association, and the Asian American Journalists Association.

=== Career ===
Lin started her career at ABC 20/20 in New York, where she worked with senior executives on long-form, investigative stories. She was then accepted into the NBC Page Program, which boasts a lower acceptance rate than Harvard University. Lin landed assignments at CNBC's Fast Money, the TODAY Show, and also worked on audience operations at Late Night with Jimmy Fallon and Saturday Night Live. Lin was presented the NBCU Outstanding Tour Operations Award for her work.

In 2010, Lin took a job at WNBC producing the morning show Today in New York, and shooting, writing, and editing content for the station's web, TV, and mobile platforms.

After several years in news broadcasting, Lin moved back to the Silicon Valley. There, she developed and launched global marketing campaigns for top-grossing mobile apps developed by DeNA and Kabam. She was named one of Girls in Tech's Top 40 Under 40 in 2016.

In 2017, Lin joined AmeriCorps as a Teaching Fellow and spent a year working with underserved children in San Jose.

Lin became a multimedia journalist and anchor with KHSL-TV in 2018. She covered the deadly Carr and Camp wildfires, the rebuilding of the town of Paradise, and President Donald Trump's tour of Butte County. Lin turned multiple stories daily, shooting, writing, and editing reports and running her own live shots.

In 2020, Lin started working as a reporter and anchor at KCRA-TV. There, she led the station's coverage of the George Floyd protests and action taken by state lawmakers in response to the rise in anti-Asian attacks. She also covered the 2021 San Jose shooting and the state's many megafires, including the Caldor Fire, Dixie Fire, and the LNU Lightning Complex Fire.

In 2022, Lin joined the KRON-TV anchor team.

=== Accolades ===
In 2022, Lin was recognized by the Radio Television Digital News Association with the Edward R. Murrow Award for her coverage of the Caldor Fire and the 1983 killing of a Vietnamese student in the city of Davis. She also won two Emmy Awards for her breaking news reports from the frontlines of the Caldor Fire. She was also recognized by NATAS for her coverage of the Dixie Fire.

In 2021, Lin was nominated for two regional Emmy awards for her work covering the civil unrest and social justice movement stemming from the murder of George Floyd, and her breaking news reports on the LNU Lightning Complex fires.

In 2020, Lin received the AP Award for Best Reporter. In 2019, she was named a Diversity Fellow with the Society of Professional Journalists, and recognized by the AP for Best Spot News covering the Camp Fire.

== Miss Asian America ==
Lin was crowned Miss Asian America in 2015. She advocated for diversity and inclusion in companies around the world and used her new platform to speak extensively on the topic. Lin also shared her views on sustainable and humane wildlife tourism. She served as a spokesperson for the Tainan Earthquake Relief Fund and was a spokesmodel for the Taiwanese fashion brand, Milida.
