= Mark Menezes =

American lawyer and government official

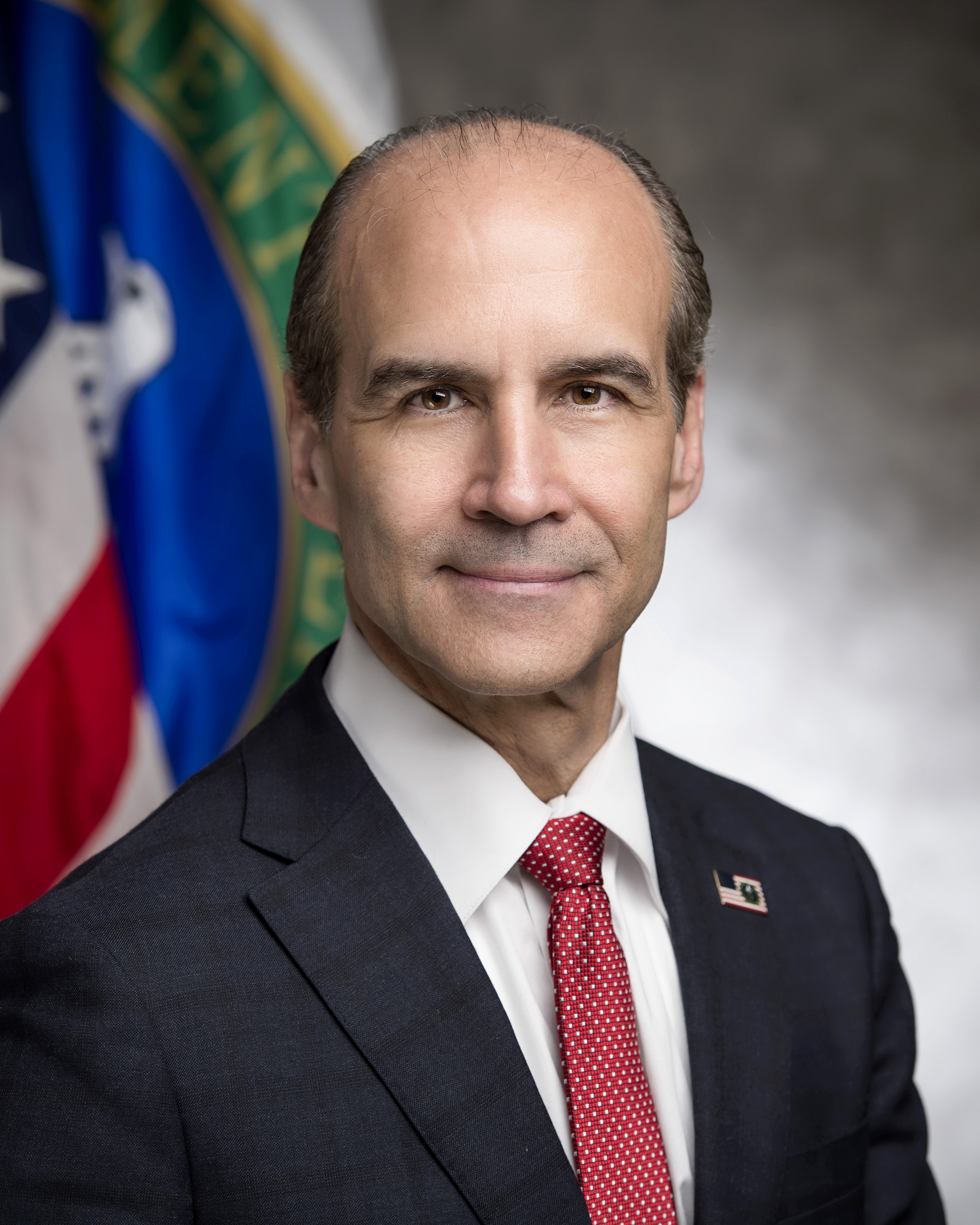
- Official portrait, 2018

20th United States Deputy Secretary of Energy
- In office August 4, 2020 – January 20, 2021; Acting: December 4, 2019 – August 4, 2020
- President: Donald Trump
- Preceded by: Dan Brouillette
- Succeeded by: David Turk

Under Secretary of Energy
- In office November 6, 2017 – August 4, 2020
- President: Donald Trump
- Succeeded by: David W. Crane (2023)

Personal details
- Born: Mark Wesley Menezes
- Education: Louisiana State University

Mark Wesley Menezes is an American lawyer and government official who served as the United States Deputy Secretary of Energy from 2020 to 2021. He previously served as Under Secretary of Energy from 2017 to 2020 and was the vice president of federal relations for Berkshire Hathaway Energy. Previously, Menezes was a partner at Hunton & Williams, chief counsel of the United States House Committee on Energy and Commerce, and vice president and associate general counsel of American Electric Power. He is a charter member of the advisory council for LSU Energy Law Center.

Secretary of Energy Dan Brouillette reportedly delegated many of his powers and responsibilities to Menezes. On February 13, 2020, U.S. President Donald Trump announced his intention to nominate Menezes as Deputy Secretary of Energy. The nomination was submitted to the U.S. Senate on March 12, 2020. Menezes was confirmed by the Senate in a 79–16 vote on August 4, 2020.
