= Lynn Coleman =

American attorney and political secretary (1939-2020)

3rd United States Deputy Secretary of Energy
- In office December 23, 1980 – January 20, 1981
- President: Jimmy Carter
- Preceded by: John C. Sawhill
- Succeeded by: W. Kenneth Davis

Personal details
- Born: Lynn Rogers Coleman; August 17, 1939 Vernon, Texas, U.S.
- Died: November 13, 2020 (aged 81) Washington, D.C., U.S.
- Political party: Democratic
- Education: Abilene Christian College (BA); University of Texas at Austin (JD)

Lynn Rogers Coleman (August 17, 1939 – November 13, 2020) was an American attorney who served as the third United States deputy secretary of energy from 1980 to 1981.

== Early life and education ==
Coleman was born in Vernon, Texas. He earned a Bachelor of Arts degree from Abilene Christian College in 1961 and a Juris Doctor from the University of Texas School of Law in 1964.

== Career ==
Coleman began his career as a lawyer for Vinson & Elkins in Houston. In 1973, he established the firm's Washington, D.C. office. During the 1972 United States Senate election in Texas, he was the campaign manager for Barefoot Sanders. A specialist in energy law, Coleman practiced before the Federal Power Commission and Federal Energy Administration. In 1978, President Jimmy Carter nominated Coleman to serve as general counsel of the newly-created United States Department of Energy. He served as United States deputy secretary of energy in 1980 and 1981. Coleman spent the rest of his career as a partner at Skadden, Arps, Slate, Meagher & Flom.
