= Confederation of European Paper Industries =

Pan-European association

The Confederation of European Paper Industries (CEPI) is the pan-European association representing the forest fibre and paper industry.

Through its 18 national associations, CEPI gathers 495 companies operating more than 900 pulp and paper mills across Europe producing paper, cardboard, pulp and other bio-based products. CEPI represents 22% of world production, €81 billion of annual turnover to the European economy and directly employs over 175,000 people.

CEPI is member of the International Council of Forest and Paper Associations (ICFPA).

== History ==
In 1992 CEPI was founded by a merger of CEPAC (Confédération Européenne de l’Industrie des pâtes, papiers et cartons) and EPI (European Paper Institute).

List of chairmen:

Period	Chairman
1992-93	Hartwig Geginat
1994-95	Frank de Wit
1996-97	Lars Helgesson
1998-99	Luis Delanders
2000-01	Juha Niemela
2002-03	Michael Gröller
2004-05	Carl Björnberg
2006-07	Frits Beurskens
2008-09	Magnus Hall
2009-10	Berry Wiersum
2011-13	Jussi Pesonen
2013-15	Gary McGann
2016-18	Peter Oswald

== Member organisations ==
Through its 18 member countries (17 European Union members plus Norway), CEPI represents 505 pulp, paper and board producing companies across Europe, ranging from small and medium-sized companies to multi-nationals, and 920 pulp and paper mills.

- Austria AUSTROPAPIER (Vereiningug der Oesterreichischen Papierindustrie
- Belgium COBELPA (Association des Fabricants de Pates, Papiers et Cartons de Belgique)
- Czech Republic ACPP (Association of the Czech Pulp and Paper Industry
- Finland FFIF (Finnish Forest Industry Federation)
- France COPACEL (Union Française des Industries des Cartons, Papiers et Celluloses)
- Germany VDP (Verband Deutscher Papierfabriken)
- Hungary FedPrint (Federation of Hungarian Printers and Papermakers)
- Italy ASSOCARTA (Associazione Italiana fra gli Industriali della Carta, Cartoni e Paste per Carta)
- Netherlands Royal VNP (Royal Netherlands Paper and Board Association)
- Norway NORSK Industri
- Poland SPP (Association of Polish Papermakers)
- Portugal CELPA (Associacao da Industria Papeleira)
- Romania ROMPAP (Romanian Paper Association)
- Slovak Republic ZCPP (Pulp and Paper Industry Federation Slovak Republic)
- Slovenia GZS (Paper and Paper Converting Industry Association)
- Spain ASPAPEL (Asociacion Espanola de Fabricantes de Pastas, Papel y Carton)
- Sweden SFIF (Swedish Forest Industry Federation)
- United Kingdom CPI (Confederation of Paper Industries)

== Areas of advocacy ==
Based in Brussels, CEPI represents its members towards the European institutions in the following areas:

- Bioeconomy
- Circular Economy
- Energy & Climate Change
- Environment
- Sustainability
- Competitiveness & Trade
- Recycling
- Resource Efficiency
- Forestry
- Innovation
- Transport
- Skills & employment

== Recycling ==
Paper for recycling is a major source of the paper industry's raw material, which is why the industry pushes for new heights for the European recycling rate. The recycling rate reached 71.5% in 2015 - exceeding the voluntary target of 70% that was set by the industries declaration in 2011 - along the paper value chain (ERPC). The total amount of paper collected and sent to recycling in paper mills in 2015 was almost 56 million tonnes, an increase of 28.1% since 2000. 18.2% was exported for recycling in third countries.

== European Paper Week ==
European Paper Week is the annual event that unites representatives globally from the European paper industry. It normally takes place at the event of the year in Brussels, Belgium.

The High-Level session is the key event at European Paper Week presenting high-level speakers not only from the industry, but also from the European institutions and other sectors. It focuses on the big issues shaping the European industry's future and discusses the future of the pulp and paper industry in the context of EU policy and the effects of globalisation.

A number of other key meetings and seminars are organised in the course of European Paper Week by industry sectors and organisations along the paper chain.
