= John K. Bush =

American judge (born 1964)

John Bush
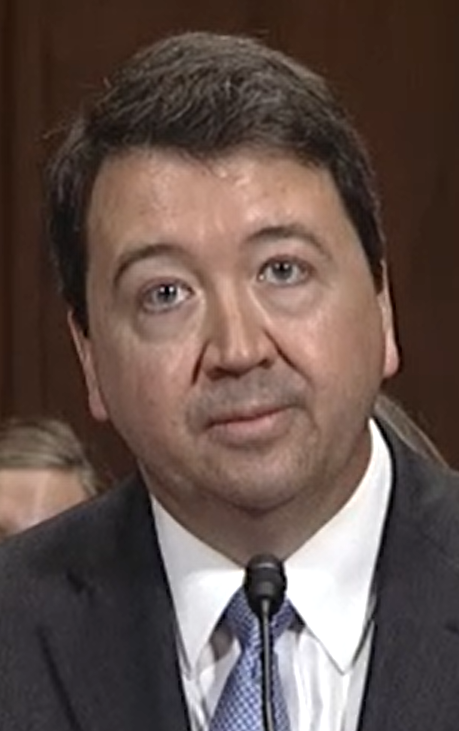

Judge of the United States Court of Appeals for the Sixth Circuit
- Incumbent
- Assumed office July 21, 2017
- Appointed by: Donald Trump
- Preceded by: Danny Julian Boggs

Personal details
- Born: John Kenneth Bush; August 24, 1964 (age 62) Hot Springs, Arkansas, U.S.
- Education: Vanderbilt University (BA); Harvard University (JD)

John Kenneth Bush (born August 24, 1964) is an American attorney and United States circuit judge of the United States Court of Appeals for the Sixth Circuit. Bush graduated from Harvard Law School and practiced in Washington, D.C., and Louisville, Kentucky, where he served as president of the local branch of the Federalist Society. In 2017, he was nominated to a seat on the Sixth Circuit by President Donald Trump.

Bush's confirmation hearings were controversial as it was revealed that he had authored pseudonymous blog posts in which he opposed gay rights and abortion and cited alt-right websites promoting birtherism and other false right-wing conspiracy theories. He was confirmed in the Senate by the Republican majority on a 51–47 vote in July 2017.

== Education and career ==
Bush received his Bachelor of Arts, summa cum laude, in 1986 from Vanderbilt University, where he was a member of Phi Beta Kappa. He received his Juris Doctor, cum laude, in 1989 from Harvard Law School, where he was Executive Editor of the Harvard Journal of Law and Public Policy and an Ames Moot Court Finalist.

After graduating from law school, Bush served as a law clerk to Judge J. Smith Henley of the United States Court of Appeals for the Eighth Circuit. He practiced law at the firm of Gibson, Dunn & Crutcher in Washington, D.C., before taking a job at Bingham Greenebaum Doll in Louisville, Kentucky. He was a partner at the firm and co-chair of the firm's litigation department before becoming a judge. Bush specialized in complex litigation, including antitrust, securities, financial institutions, insurance, intellectual property, and product liability disputes. Bush was chairman of the Louisville chapter of the Federalist Society before becoming a judge.

== Federal judicial service ==
=== Nomination and confirmation ===
On May 8, 2017, President Donald Trump nominated Bush to the United States Court of Appeals for the Sixth Circuit seat vacated by Judge Danny Julian Boggs, who assumed senior status on February 28, 2017. A hearing on his nomination before the United States Senate Committee on the Judiciary was held on June 14, 2017. On a questionnaire submitted to the committee, Bush acknowledged that between 2007 and 2016, he had pseudonymously authored approximately 400 blog posts on Elephants in the Bluegrass, a blog founded by his wife, Bridget. His blog posts expressed opposition to gay marriage, the Affordable Care Act, public financing of political campaigns, and the idea of trying terrorists in civilian courts. Bush also compared abortion to slavery, and cited media reports containing "birther" falsehoods about Barack Obama's citizenship. When questioned about his blogging during his judicial nomination process, Bush said that "my personal views are irrelevant to the position for which I have been nominated" and that "blogging is a political activity. It is not appropriate to bring politics to the bench." On July 13, 2017, his nomination was reported out of committee by a 11–9 vote.

On July 19, 2017, the United States Senate invoked cloture on his nomination by a 51–48 vote. The following day, he was confirmed by a 51–47 vote. He received his judicial commission on July 21, 2017.

=== Notable cases ===
==== Abortion ====
Bush authored the opinion in EMW Women's Surgical Center v. Beshear (2019), in which the Sixth Circuit upheld, 2–1, a Kentucky law compelling physicians to show and describe a fetal ultrasound to patients before performing an abortion. The law, part of a years-long effort to restrict abortion access in Kentucky, had previously been deemed unconstitutional by a lower court. Bush wrote that the law "provides truthful, non-misleading, and relevant information aimed at informing a patient about her decision to abort unborn life". Judge Alan Eugene Norris joined Bush's opinion; Judge Bernice B. Donald dissented, writing that the Kentucky law "has coopted physicians' examining tables, their probing instruments, and their voices in order to espouse a political message, without regard to the health of the patient or the judgment of the physician". On December 9, 2019, the Supreme Court declined to review the case, leaving in place Bush's opinion.

==== ADA ====
Bush authored the court's opinion in McDonald v. UAW-GM Center for Human Resources finding that the Americans with Disabilities Act did not require the defendant to extend the employee's lunch break for her to exercise. The plaintiff requested an extended lunch break for doctor-required exercise. The employer was in the decision-making process regarding the accommodation when the employee was suspended for insubordination and use of profanity toward her superior. During the suspension, the plaintiff voluntarily quit her job. The court found that the doctor did not require that the employee work out during her lunch break and that it was only the employee's preference. Furthermore, the employer was engaged in an interactive process regarding the requested accommodation when the employee quit voluntarily, therefore no ADA violation was found.

==== Separation of powers ====
Bush joined the court's opinion in Hagy v. Demers & Adams, LLC involving a letter sent from an attorney discharging the plaintiffs' debts following a mortgage foreclosure. The letter failed to include language disclosing that it came from a debt collector as required under the Fair Debt Collections Protections Act (FDCPA). Despite the fact that no injury or harm came from the failure to disclose, nor was the letter unfair, deceptive, or harassing as the FDCPA aims to prevent, the district court awarded $1,000 in statutory penalties and over $74,000 in attorneys fees to the plaintiffs. The circuit court reversed, finding that the plaintiffs had no standing in court because no harm had occurred outside of a bare procedural violation. Citing the Supreme Court in Spokeo, Inc. v. Robins, the circuit court found that Congress had overstepped its congressional authority by creating injuries that satisfy Article III standing requirements where no actual harm had occurred. The court found that Congress may not "simply enact an injury into existence, using its lawmaking power to transform something that is not remotely harmful into something that is".

==== Qualified immunity ====
Bush wrote a concurrence in the case Yates v. Davis regarding former Rowan County, Kentucky court clerk Kim Davis, who refused to marriage licenses following the U.S. Supreme Court's decision recognizing a constitutional right to same-sex marriage in Obergefell v. Hodges. The court found that Davis was not entitled to sovereign or qualified immunity and allowed the case to move forward. Bush authored a concurrence, agreeing that Davis did not qualify for sovereign or qualified immunity, but using a different level of scrutiny to evaluate the question of qualified immunity.

On June 18, 2020, in Wright v. City of Euclid, Bush reversed the district court's decision to grant qualified immunity for police officers who tased, pepper-sprayed, and arrested Lamar Wright, a black man who had his hands raised and was cooperating with the officers but had trouble exiting his vehicle due to a colostomy bag from a recent surgery. The circuit court's unanimous decision to remand for a jury trial on unconstitutional use of force, false arrest, extended detention, and malicious prosecution claims was authored by Bush. The court also reversed the dismissal of Wright's Monell claims based on police training that notably included a Chris Rock video and a cartoon of a police officer beating a figure lying on the ground.

==== Fourth Amendment ====
In July 2020, Bush wrote for the unanimous panel when it found that the warrantless use of a camera hidden in the hallway outside the accused's apartment door was not an unconstitutional search of the home's curtilage.

== See also ==
- Donald Trump judicial appointment controversies

Legal offices
Preceded by Danny Julian Boggs	Judge of the United States Court of Appeals for the Sixth Circuit; 2017–present	Incumbent
