= W. Kenneth Davis =

American chemist (1918-2005)

United States Deputy Secretary of Energy
- In office May 14, 1981 – January 13, 1983
- President: Ronald Reagan
- Preceded by: Lynn Coleman
- Succeeded by: Danny J. Boggs

Personal details
- Born: July 26, 1918 Seattle, Washington
- Died: July 29, 2005 (aged 87) San Rafael, California
- Education: University of California

W. Kenneth Davis (July 26, 1918 – July 29, 2005) was an American chemist, a leader of the World Energy Council, former vice president of the National Academy of Engineering, former U.S. Deputy Secretary of Energy, director of reactor development in the Atomic Energy Commission. He was elected to the National Academy of Engineering in 1970 “for contributions to the development of nuclear power technology and its industrial application.” From May 14, 1981 to January 13, 1983, he served as United States Deputy Secretary of Energy under Ronald Reagan.
