= David Turk =

American lawyer and government official

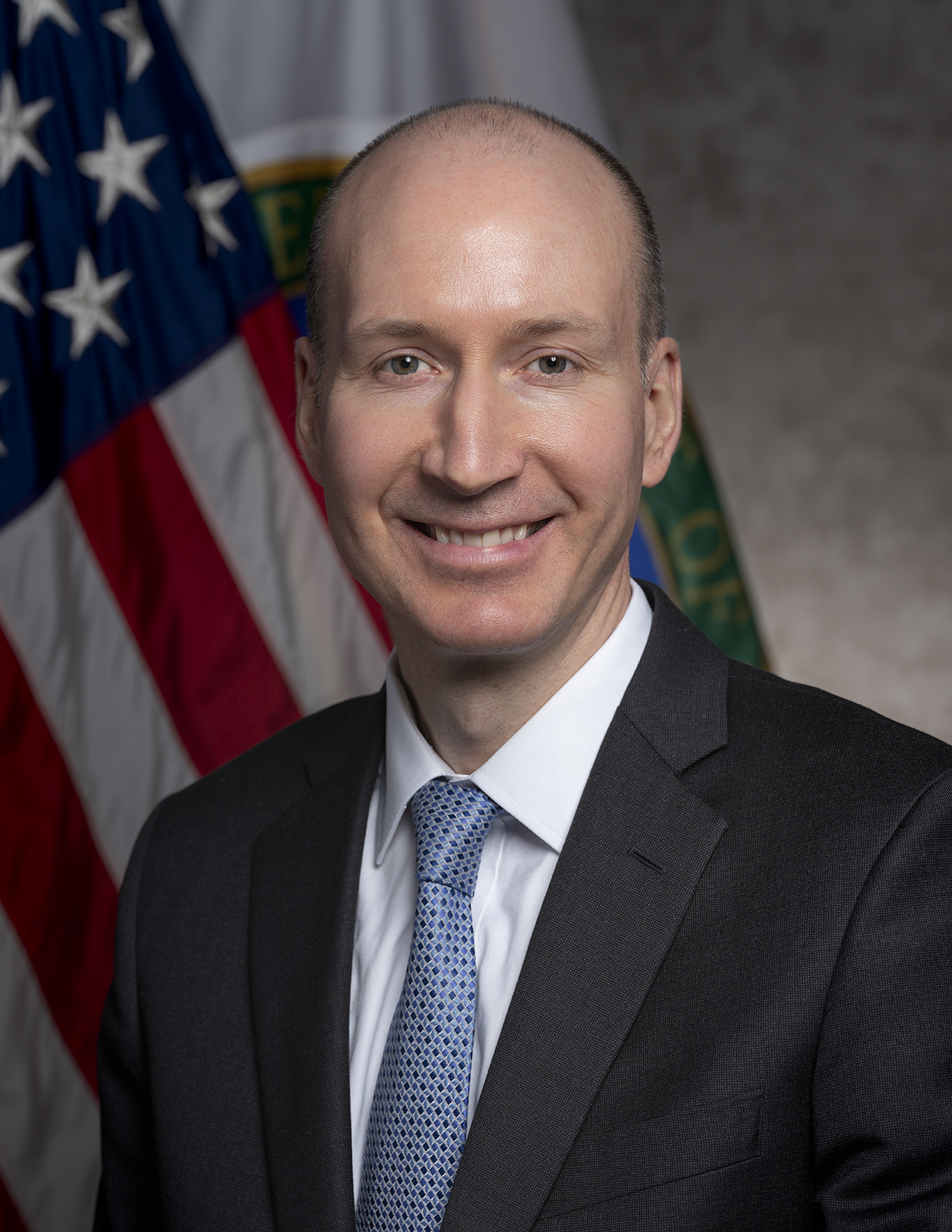
- Official portrait, 2021

21st United States Deputy Secretary of Energy
- In office March 25, 2021 – January 20, 2025
- President: Joe Biden
- Preceded by: Mark Menezes
- Succeeded by: James Danly

Personal details
- Born: Quito, Ecuador
- Party: Democratic
- Spouse: Emily Turk
- Children: 3
- Education: University of Illinois Urbana-Champaign (BA); University of Virginia (JD)

David M. Turk is an American attorney who served as the United States deputy secretary of energy in the Biden administration from 2021 to 2025.

== Early life and education ==
Turk was born in Quito, Ecuador and raised in Rock Falls, Illinois. Turk attended Rock Falls High School before he earned a bachelor's degree from the University of Illinois at Urbana–Champaign and a Juris Doctor from the University of Virginia School of Law in 1999.

== Career ==
From 2001 to 2007, Turk worked in the United States Senate offices of Joe Biden and Kent Conrad. He was also the staff director of the United States House Oversight Subcommittee on National Security. During the Obama administration, he served as a special assistant to the president and senior director of the United States National Security Council. He then moved to the United States Department of State, where he worked as a deputy special envoy for climate change and helped coordinate efforts to limit the proliferation of nuclear weapons between Russia and the United States. Turk later served as Deputy Assistant Secretary of Energy for International Climate and Technology. He joined the International Energy Agency in October 2016, where he helped promote clean energy around the world.

On February 13, 2021, his nomination by President Joe Biden to be Deputy Secretary of Energy was formally submitted to the Senate for confirmation. The Senate Committee on Energy and Natural Resources favorably reported the nomination by a 20–0 vote, and the full United States Senate confirmed Turk by a 98–2 vote on March 24, 2021, with only Senators Josh Hawley and Rand Paul in opposition. He was sworn in on March 25, 2021, by Secretary Jennifer Granholm.

Republicans criticized Turk for his role in pausing U.S. liquified natural gas export approvals for environmental review in early 2024.

In 2025, Turk was named director of the Hewlett Foundation's environmental program.

== Personal life ==
Turk and his wife, Emily, have three children. Emily is a sustainability expert and architect.

Political offices
Preceded by Mark Menezes	United States Deputy Secretary of Energy; 2021–2025	Succeeded by James Danly
