= Dan Brouillette =

American government official (born 1962)

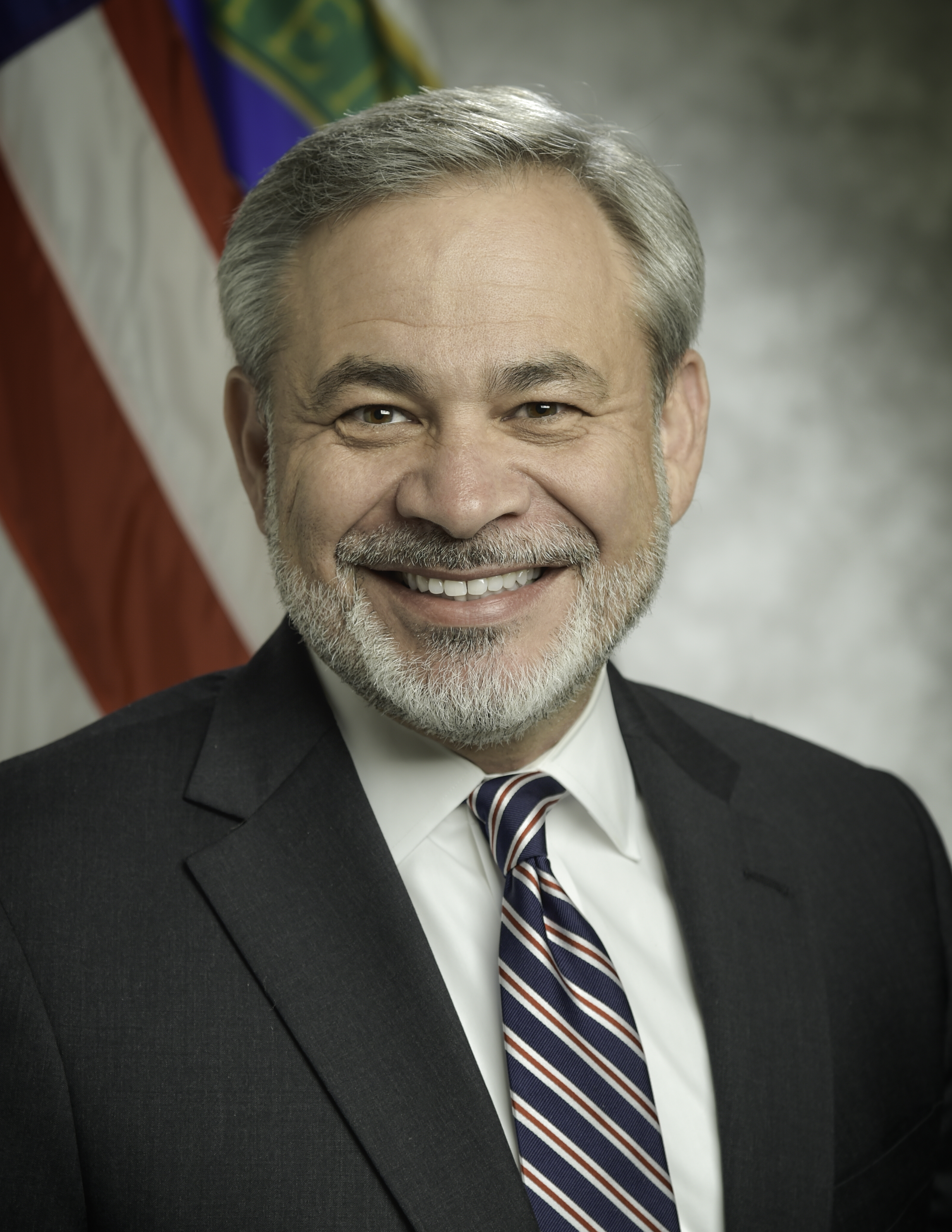
- Official portrait, 2017

15th United States Secretary of Energy
- In office December 1, 2019 – January 20, 2021; Acting: December 1, 2019 – December 4, 2019
- President: Donald Trump
- Deputy: Mark Menezes
- Preceded by: Rick Perry
- Succeeded by: Jennifer Granholm

19th United States Deputy Secretary of Energy
- In office August 8, 2017 – December 4, 2019
- President: Donald Trump
- Preceded by: Elizabeth Sherwood-Randall
- Succeeded by: Mark Menezes

Assistant Secretary of Energy for Congressional and Intergovernmental Affairs
- In office August 1, 2001 – October 3, 2003
- President: George W. Bush
- Preceded by: John Angell
- Succeeded by: Rick Dearborn

Personal details
- Born: Danny Ray Brouillette; August 18, 1962 (age 64) Paincourtville, Louisiana, U.S.
- Party: Republican
- Spouse: Adrienne (m. 1989)
- Children: 9
- Education: University of Maryland, University College (BA)
- Occupation: Government official; lobbyist; businessman

Military service
- Branch/service: United States Army
- Years of service: 1982–1987
- Commands: 11th Armored Cavalry Regiment

Danny Ray Brouillette (/bruːˈjɛt/ born August 18, 1962) is an American government official, lobbyist, businessman, and Army veteran who served as the 15th United States Secretary of Energy in the first Donald Trump administration from 2019 to 2021. He previously served as the United States Deputy Secretary of Energy from August 2017 to December 2019. In 2023, Brouillette was named president and chief executive officer elect of the Edison Electric Institute.

== Early life and career ==
Danny Ray Brouillette was born on August 18, 1962, in Paincourtville, Louisiana. He graduated from the University of Maryland Global Campus in 1995.

Following his service in the United States Army, Brouillette was U.S. representative Billy Tauzin's legislative director from 1989 to 1997. From 1997 to 2000, he was Senior Vice President of R. Duffy Wall & Associates, a DC-based lobbying firm. Brouillette was Assistant Secretary for Congressional and Intergovernmental Affairs in the United States Department of Energy from 2001 to 2003 under President George W. Bush.

He was chief of staff under Rep. Billy Tauzin and was also staff director for the United States House Committee on Energy and Commerce from 2003 to 2004, when Tauzin chaired the committee. Brouillette was involved in crafting provisions included in the Energy Policy Act of 2005, specifically with respect to the Department of Energy loan guarantee program and federal authorization of importation and exportation of liquid natural gas.

From 2004 to 2006, Brouillette was a vice president at Ford Motor Company and sat on Ford's North American Operating Committee. In 2006, Brouillette became head of public policy and senior vice president at United Services Automobile Association.

Brouillette was a member of Louisiana's State Mineral and Energy Board from 2013 to 2016. He was awarded the 2020 Distinguished Alumnus Award by the University of Maryland Global Campus Alumni Association. In 2021, he joined the American Council for Capital Formation's board of advisors.

=== Deputy Secretary of Energy (2017–2019) ===
On April 3, 2017, President Donald Trump announced he would nominate Brouillette as United States Deputy Secretary of Energy in the United States Department of Energy. Brouillette was confirmed by the U.S. Senate on August 3, 2017. He was sworn in as the Deputy Secretary of Energy on August 8, 2017.

=== Secretary of Energy (2019–2021) ===
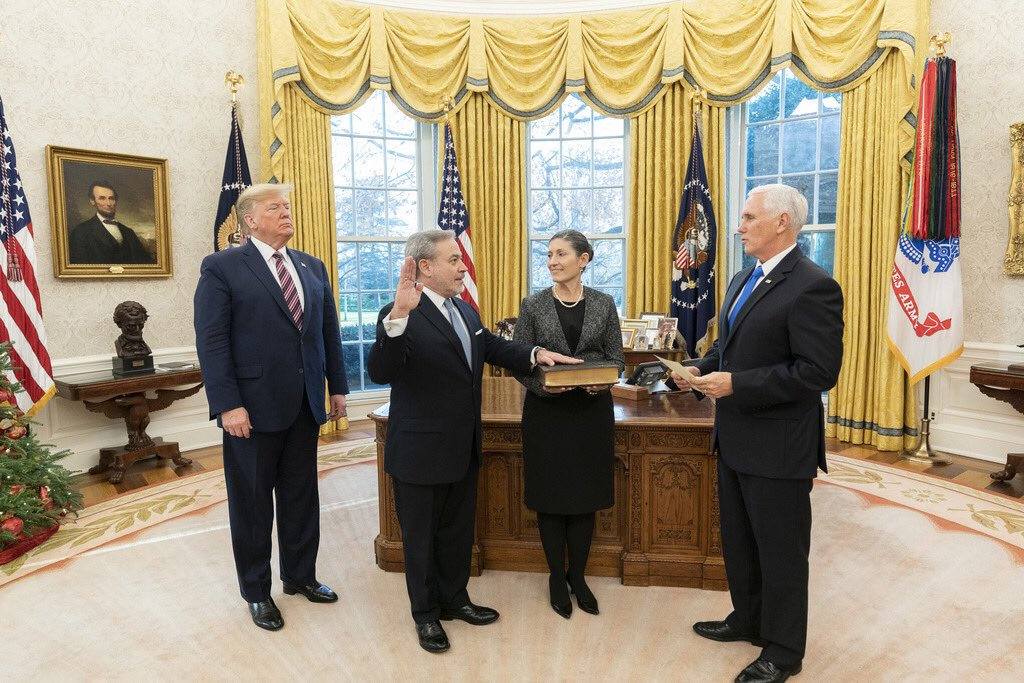
Dan Brouillette being sworn in on December 11, 2019.

On October 18, 2019, President Trump announced he would nominate Brouillette as United States Secretary of Energy to replace Rick Perry, who had announced he would step down by the end of the year. On November 7, 2019, President Trump sent his nomination to the Senate.

Perry formally resigned as Energy Secretary on December 1, 2019, making Brouillette the acting secretary, as his nomination was still pending before the U.S. Senate. On December 2, 2019, the Senate confirmed his nomination by a vote of 70–15. Brouillette was formally sworn in on December 11, 2019. Then-Under Secretary of Energy Mark Menezes served as Acting Deputy Secretary of Energy until he was confirmed as Deputy Secretary on August 4, 2020.

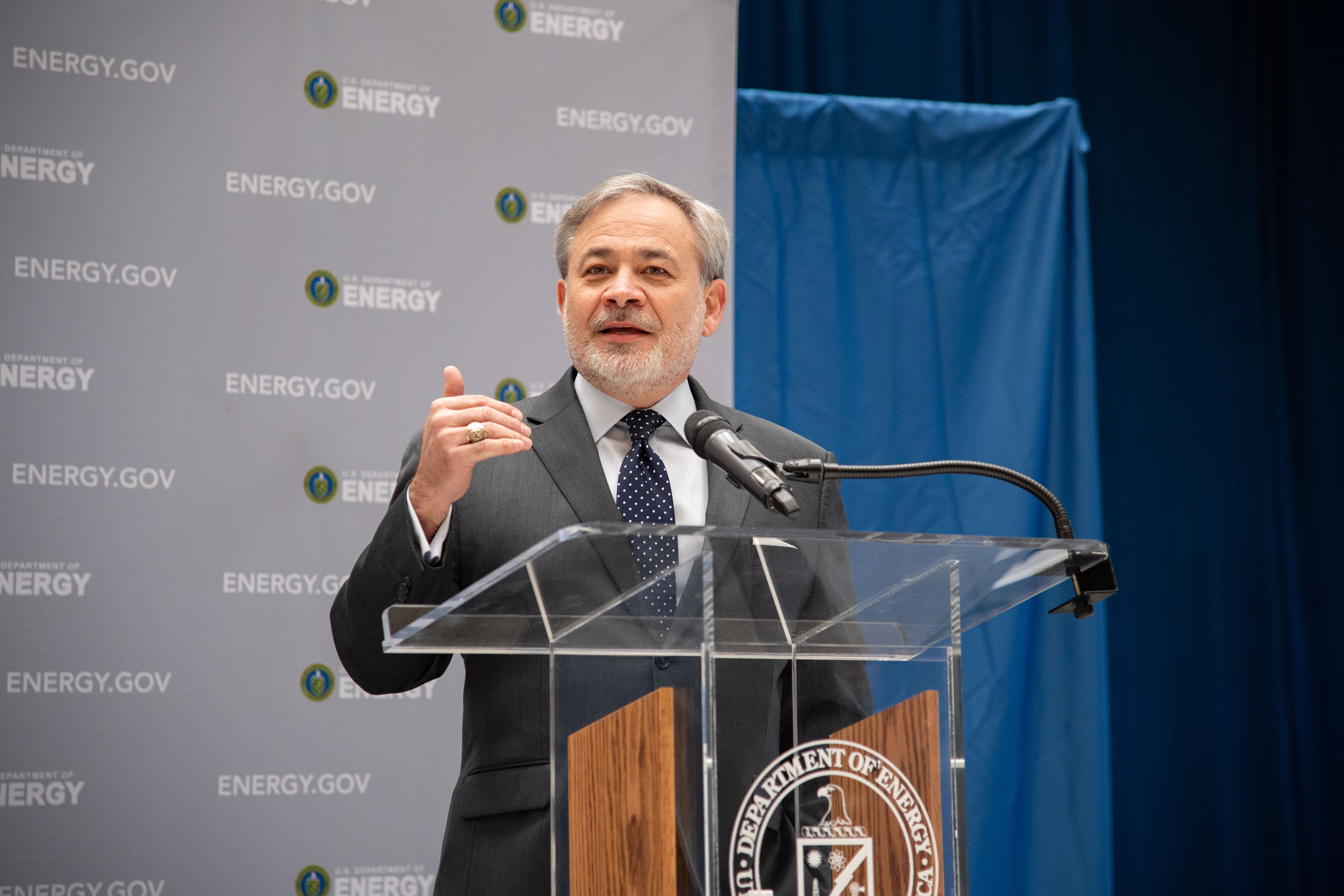
Secretary Brouillette speaks at a farewell event at the Department of Energy Headquarters in Washington D.C. in January 2021.

In December 2020, as part of the recently signed Abraham Accords, Brouillette convened a "first-of-its kind" meeting between the energy minister of Israel and counterparts from several Arab nations.

On January 7, 2021, Brouillette promised a seamless handover between the Trump and Biden administrations.

== Post-Trump administration ==
=== Sempra Infrastructure ===
Brouillette was named the president of Sempra Infrastructure in July 2021 and started with the company in November of that year. During his time with Sempra, Brouillette oversaw the Port Arthur LNG project in Texas and a heads of agreement deal with TotalEnergies, Mitsui, Mitsubishi and NYK for Cameron LNG Phase 2.

=== Edison Electric Institute ===
On August 16, 2023, the Edison Electric Institute, the interest group for United States investor-owned electric utilities, named Brouillette its president and chief executive officer, effective January 1, 2024. He resigned on October 28, 2024, less than 10 months after taking the position, saying he wanted to focus on global energy issues.

== Personal life ==
Brouillette and his wife, Adrienne, are U.S. Army veterans and the parents of nine children, all of whom the couple homeschooled. They reside in Maryland. He served in the Army from 1982 to 1987 as a tank commander in Germany in the "Fulda Gap" and as a Drill Sergeant in the Army Reserve in South Carolina.

Political offices
Preceded by Elizabeth Randall	United States Deputy Secretary of Energy; 2017–2019	Succeeded by Mark Menezes
Preceded by Rick Perry	United States Secretary of Energy; 2019–2021	Succeeded by Jennifer Granholm
U.S. order of precedence (ceremonial)
Preceded by Eugene Scalia as Former U.S. Cabinet Member	Order of precedence of the United States as Former U.S. Cabinet Member	Succeeded by Lloyd Austin as Former U.S. Cabinet Member
