= Miss Asian America =

Miss Asian Global Pageant
- Formation: August 1, 1985
- Type: Beauty Pageant
- Headquarters: United States
- Website: https://www.missasianglobal.com/

Miss Asian Global Pageant (founded August 1, 1985) was initiated as a part of the Asian Heritage Celebration for the County of Santa Clara in 1985, the pageant's top titleholders include the former First Lady of the State of Washington, Mona Lee Locke, wife of Gary Locke and Fala Chen, the 2013 winner of the Huading Award for Best Female Drama Actress.

== Background ==
Founded in 1985 by Rose Chung at the Asian Arts Festival in Santa Clara, California, the Miss Asian Global Pageant was a response to the underrepresentation of Asian women in mainstream pageantry and Hollywood. Chung emphasized, “true representation goes beyond visibility; it’s about empowerment. It’s about proclaiming that Asian women deserve the spotlight.”

In 2014, the Asian America Foundation (AAF) was introduced as a nonprofit organization devoted to support Asian women. That same year, AAF launched the Imagine Talks leadership conference to create a new space to showcase prominent Asian American and Pacific Islander (AAPI) voices.

== Titleholders ==
Year	Miss Asian Global	Miss Asian America	Miss Asian Teen	Miss Asian of California	Miss Asian San Francisco	List of Miss Asian Global runners-up			
Year	Miss Asian Global	Miss Asian America	Miss Asian Teen	Miss Asian of California	Miss Asian San Francisco	First Princess	Second Princess	Third Princess	Fourth Princess
2026	()	Not awarded	()	()	()	()	()	()	()
2025	Samantha Teshima (Japanese & Korean • Danville)	Not awarded	Chloe Luo (Chinese • Houston)	Mia Cunnan (Filipino • San Rafael)	Allison Young (Chinese • Redwood City)	Chloe Luo (Chinese • Houston)	Mia Cunnan (Chinese • San Rafael)	Jada Her ( Hmong • Fresno, CA)	Lisa Yiwen Cheng (Chinese • Houston)
2024	Raine Xiong ( Hmong · Sheboygan)	Not awarded	Jackie Tang (Indonesia & China · San Francisco)	Tong Yu (Chinese · San Francisco)	Sona Seunga Kim (Korean · Los Altos)	Tong Yu (Chinese · San Francisco)	Qian Liu (Chinese · Boston)	Yashi Gondwal (Indian · Lakeland)	Sona Seunga Kim (Korean · Los Altos)
2023	Kylie Chang (Chinese · Cupertino)	Erin Kwon (Korean · Irvine)	Not awarded	Felicia Tang (Chinese · San Francisco)	Vanessa Mai (Chinese · San Francisco)	Felicia Tang (Chinese · San Francisco)	My Tien Angela Van (Vietnamese · Orlando)	Skye Yasuda (Japanese · Waipahu)	Not awarded
2022	Lisa Yan (China · San Francisco)	Angella Lee (Korean · Los Angeles)	Makenna Ma (Chinese · San Jose)	Jackie Teer (Filipino · San Francisco)	Claire Ong (Chinese & Vietnamese · Seattle)	Emily Smith (Japanese & British · Mililani)	Jade Lun (Chinese · Honolulu)	Not awarded	Not awarded
2021	No Pageant Held								
2020	Olivia Wong (Chinese · Vancouver)	Vy Vo (Vietnamese · Anaheim)	Not awarded	Daisy Chung (Chinese · Los Angeles)	Tara Nash (Hong Konger & Irish · San Mateo)	Lan Ho (Vietnamese · Chicago)	Daisy Chung (Chinese · Los Angeles)	Tara Nash (Hong Kong & Irish · San Mateo)	Not awarded
2019	Stephanie Kim (South Korean · San Francisco)	Melanie Wardhana (Indonesian & Chinese · San Francisco)	Not awarded	Rachel Xu (Chinese · Fremont)	Josie Li (Taiwanese · San Francisco)	Rachel Xu (Chinese · Fremont)	Josie Li (Taiwanese · San Francisco)	Sidney Siu (Chinese · Hercules)	Not awarded
2018	Uchka Jimsee (Mongolian · San Francisco)	Sophia Ng (Dethroned) (Chinese · San Francisco) Darae Jun (Assumed) (Korean · Berkeley)	Not awarded	Darae Jun (Korean · Berkeley)	Kimberly Tom (Chinese · Foster City)	Darae Jun (Assumed) (Korean · Berkeley)	Aileen Bui (Vietnamese · Nha Trang)	Kimberly Tom (Chinese · Foster City)	Not awarded
2017	Trisha Bantigue (Filipino & Chinese · San Francisco)	Savannah Pham (Vietnam & Cambodian · Murrieta)	Not awarded	Kate Melanie Lam (Chinese · San Bruno)	Alexis Yup (Taiwanese · San Francisco)	Kate Melanie Lam (Chinese · San Bruno)	Alexis Yup (Taiwanese · San Francisco)	Ernestine Siu (Chinese · Oakland)	Not awarded
2016	Gina Su (Hong Konger & Taiwanese · Rolling Hills)	Jessica Lim (Hong Konger · San Francisco)	Ally Gong (China · Palo Alto)	Angela Huang (Chinese · San Ramon)	Kristine Hara (Japanese · San Francisco)	Joanne Leung (Hong Konger · Montreal)	Angela Huang (Chinese · San Ramon)	Kristine Hara (Japanese · San Francisco)	Not awarded
2015	Pamela Lagera (Filipino · Fresno)	Stephanie Lin (Taiwanese · Silicon Valley)	Not awarded	Malia Kurashima Carlson (Japanese · Oakland)	Jennie Li (Chinese · San Jose)	Malia Kurashima Carlson (Japanese · Oakland)	Jennie Li (Chinese · San Jose)	Puja Oza (Indian · Los Angeles)	Not awarded
2014	Emma Marriott (China & Wales · Stanford)	Jennifer Chung (Vietnamese, Chinese & German · San Jose)	Maggie Schoenholtz (Thai · Palo Alto)	Arienne Calingo (Filipino · Los Angeles)	May Ling Phyu (Burmese & Chinese · Fremont)	Catherine Ho (Chinese & Taiwanese · Las Vegas)	Jeni Nguyen (Vietnamese · Greenville)	Sunaina Singh (Indian · Chicago)	Not awarded
2013	No Pageant Held								
2012	Susie Lee (Korea · San Francisco)	Emily Tang (Chinese · Davis)	Not awarded	April Kim (Korean · Irvine)	Not awarded	Emily Tang (Chinese · Davis)	April Kim (Korean · Irvine)	Jasmine Lee (Chinese & Taiwanese · San Francisco)	Not awarded
2011	No Pageant Held								
Year	Miss Asian America	Miss Asian Teen	Miss Asian of California	Miss Asian San Francisco	List of Miss Asian America runners-up				
Year	Miss Asian America	Miss Asian Teen	Miss Asian of California	Miss Asian San Francisco	First Princess	Second Princess	Third Princess		
2010	Sarah Liu (Chinese · Fremont	Not awarded	Amanda Lee (Chinese · Davis)	Not awarded	Amanda Lee (Chinese · Davis)	Nancy Kwong (Chinese · Los Angeles)	Brijal Vadgama (Indian · Lincoln)		
2009	Amy Chanthaphavong (Laotian & Vietnamese · New York)	Not awarded	Victoria Pham (Vietnamese · Fremont)	Kristine Law (Chinese · Fremont)	Victoria Pham (Vietnamese · Fremont)	Kristine Law (Chinese · Fremont)	Carolyn Fung (Chinese · San Jose)		
2008	Louisa Liu (Chinese · Sunnyvale)	Not awarded	Mary Saleh (Afghan, Turkish & Persian · Cupertino)	Lisa Ma (Vietnamese & Chinese · San Francisco)	Mary Saleh (Afghan, Turkish & Persian · Cupertino)	Nina Kasuga (Japanese · Gilbert)	Stephanie Karlik (Taiwanese, Portuguese, Scotch & Irish · Las Vegas)		
2007	Louise Wu (Chinese · Fremont)	Not awarded	Tiffani Frances Mah (Chinese · San Francisco)	Amy Chu (Chinese · Oakland)	Tiffani Frances Mah (Chinese · San Francisco)	Ayushka Sing Gharib (Indian · Artesia	Amy Chu (Chinese · Oakland)		
2006	Jennifer Field (Korean, English, Irish & German · San Jose)	Not awarded	Jessica Feng (Chinese · Los Angeles)	Claire Yuan (Chinese · Daly City)	Jessica Feng (Chinese · Los Angeles)	Katie N. Au (Chinese & Hawaiian · Seattle)	Monica You (Cambodian & Khmer · Mira Loma)		
2005	Kollyn Muangmaithong (Thai & Chinese · Walnut Creek)	Michele Chen (Taiwan · San Jose)	Carolyn Michaelis (Indonesian, German, & Dutch · San Jose)	Shana Dhillon (Indian · Fremont)	Carolyn Michaelis (Indonesian, German, & Dutch · San Jose)	Shana Dhillon (Indian · Fremont)	Kara Birkenstock (Thai & Filipino · Culver City)		
2004	Buachampoo "Sai" Varee (Thai · Los Angeles)	Not awarded	Kim Choy (Chinese · San Francisco)	Jennifer Lee (Chinese · San Francisco)	Kim Choy (Chinese · San Francisco)	Annie Tang (Chinese · Garden Grove)	Virginia Nguyen (Vietnamese · Newark)		
2003	Charlene M. Wang (Chinese · Hercules)	Not awarded	Anu Gill (Indian · Davis)	Annie Chang (Taiwanese · Foster City)	Anu Gill (Indian · Davis)	Annie Chang (Taiwanese · Foster City)	Sue Yang ( Hmong · West Sacramento)		
2002	Fala Chen (Chinese · Duluth)	Not awarded	Pooja Jain (Indian · Fremont)	Violet Nguyen (Vietnamese · San Jose)	Chun Hui Chen (Chinese · Honolulu)	Joy Thao Phuong Nguyen (Vietnamese · Fort Worth)	Pooja Jain (Indian · Fremont)		
2001	Caroline Nguyen (Unknown)	Not awarded	Wilma Morales (Unknown)	Andra Cheung (Unknown)	Jamie Choi (Unknown)	Wilma Morales (Unknown)	Meeyoung Kim (Unknown)		
2000	No Pageant Held								
1999	Amy Truong (Vietnamese · Oakland)	Not awarded	Not awarded	Not awarded	Amrapali Ambegaokar (East India · Walnut)	Shelene Atanacio (Los Angeles)	Ha Thai (China & Vietnamese · San Francisco)		
1998	Quyen Hoang Tran (Unknown · Sunnyvale)	Not awarded	Minita J. Gandhi (Unknown · Danville)	Laura S. Ngo (Unknown · San Jose)	Minita J. Gandhi (Unknown · Danville)	Denby Annette Kwai Foong Dung (Unknown · Honolulu)	Laura S. Ngo (Unknown · San Jose)		
1997	Erin Jung (Unknown · Sacramento)	Not awarded	Not awarded	Not awarded	Elyzabeth Pham (Unknown · La Jolla)	Stacey Chinn (Unknown · San Francisco)	Tammy Nguyen (Unknown · Chicago)		
1996	Esther Hwang (Korean · Emeryville)	Not awarded	Cheryl Nunes (Hawaiian, Chinese, Portuguese, & Filipino · Beverly Hills)	Ying Hu (Chinese · Los Altos Hills)	Cheryl Nunes (Hawaiian, Chinese, Portuguese, & Filipino · Beverly Hills)	Mimi Jung (Chinese · Puyallup)	Debra Ichimura (Japanese · Honolulu)		
1995	Gwendoline Yeo (Singaporean · San Francisco)	Not awarded	Not awarded	Elizabeth Wong (Chinese · San Francisco)	Jennifer Chin (Chinese · Woodside)	Amanda Quan (Vietnamese · Sunnyvale)	Shung-Yan Ng (Chinese · Bellevue)		
1994	Jane Park (Korean · Granada Hills)	Not awarded	Zarin Maneck Dastur (Indian · Los Angeles)	Marie Villatuya (Filipino · So. San Francisco)	Zarin Maneck Dastur (Indian · Los Angeles)	Marie Villatuya (Filipino · So. San Francisco)	Liang Ni (Chinese · Honolulu)		
1993	No Pageant Held								
1992	Ashley Yamada (Japan · Honolulu)	Not awarded	Julie Esguerra (Filipino & Chinese · Laguna Hills)	Not awarded	Shiyena Chun (Korean · Honolulu)	Julie Esguerra (Filipino & Chinese · Laguna Hills)	Sylvia Gee ( Chinese· Sacramento)		
1991	Christie Hirota (Filipino & Japan · San Francisco)	Not awarded	Annie Deng (Chinese · Cerritos)	Thao Diep (Vietnamese & Chinese · Santa Clara)	Annie Deng (Chinese · Cerritos)	Thao Diep (Vietnamese & Chinese · Santa Clara)	Wendy Tagomori (Japanese · Pearl City)		
Year	Miss Asian of California	Miss Asian San Francisco	List of Miss Asian of California runners-up						
Year	Miss Asian of California	Miss Asian San Francisco	First Princess	Second Princess	Third Princess	Fourth Princess			
1990	Cindy Chung (Korean · Santa Clara)	Ellen Chu (Chinese · San Francisco)	Sandy Wang (Chinese · Los Angeles)	Jamie Chou (Chinese · Sacramento)	Pia Rius Vitalis (Filipino · Danville)	Not awarded			
1989	Theresa Park (Korean · Sausalito)	Angela Chang (Korean · San Francisco)	Leah Sarmiento (Filipino · Union City	Joyce Chang (Chinese · Long Beach)	Mika Tomoyo Yee (Japanese · San Diego)	Not awarded			
1988	Stacy Yamashita (Japanese · So. San Francisco)	Not awarded	Cindy Tsao (Chinese · Sunnyvale)	Cheryl Lee (Chinese · Foster City)	Rachelle Gaspar (Filipino · Daly City) Lisa Chen (Chinese · Montebello	Karin Co (Chinese · Burbank			
1987	Delia Ma (Unknown)	Not awarded	Jennifer Deperio (Unknown)	Unknown (Unknown)	Unknown (Unknown)	Not awarded			
1986	Mona Lee Locke (Chinese · Lafayette)	Not awarded	Nancy Yong (Chinese · San Francisco)	Jane Matsumoto Holybee (Japanese · Davis	Donna Morrill (Filipino, Irish & Scotch · Union City	Not awarded			
1985	Jeanette Chan (Unknown)	Not awarded	Michelle Knolle (Unknown)	Aleili Orzal (Unknown)	Lisa Johnson (Unknown)	Not awarded			

== See also ==
- List of beauty contests
