= Esther Hwang =

American model

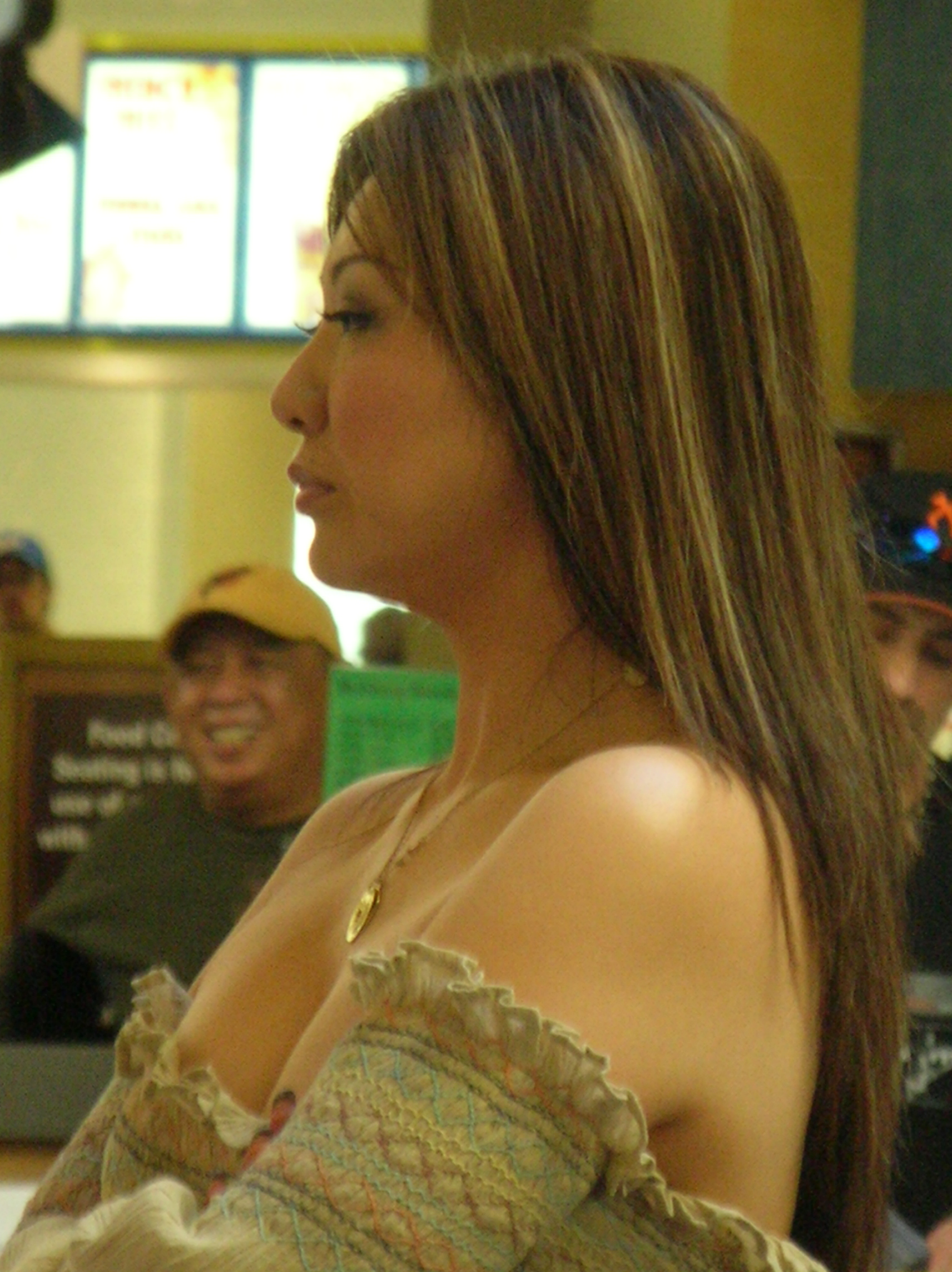
- Esther Hwang at Serramonte Center, 2010

Esther Hwang is an American model, former Miss Asian America, and former scheduling secretary for San Francisco mayor Willie Brown.

Esther Hwang was born on January 10, 1974, in Seoul, South Korea. She immigrated to America at the age of one and grew up in Los Angeles’ Korea Town. In 1996, she won the Miss Asian America Pageant. She received a scholarship to UC Berkeley and graduated summa cum laude in 1997. Soon after, she joined the staff of Willie Brown while he was Mayor of San Francisco. Doing so substantially increased her web traffic and notoriety as a model.

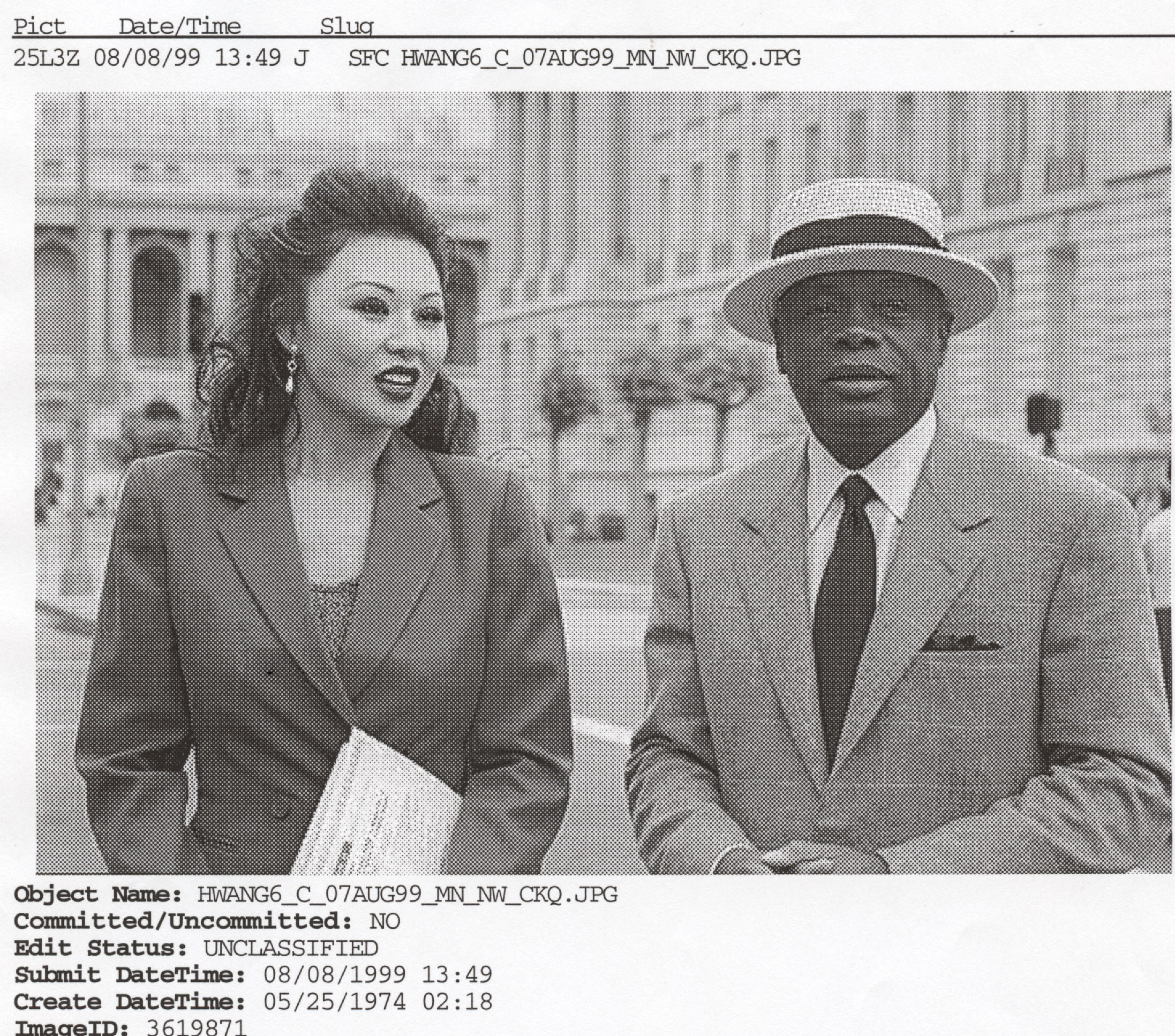
Esther Hwang was Mayor Willie Brown's scheduling secretary in 1999

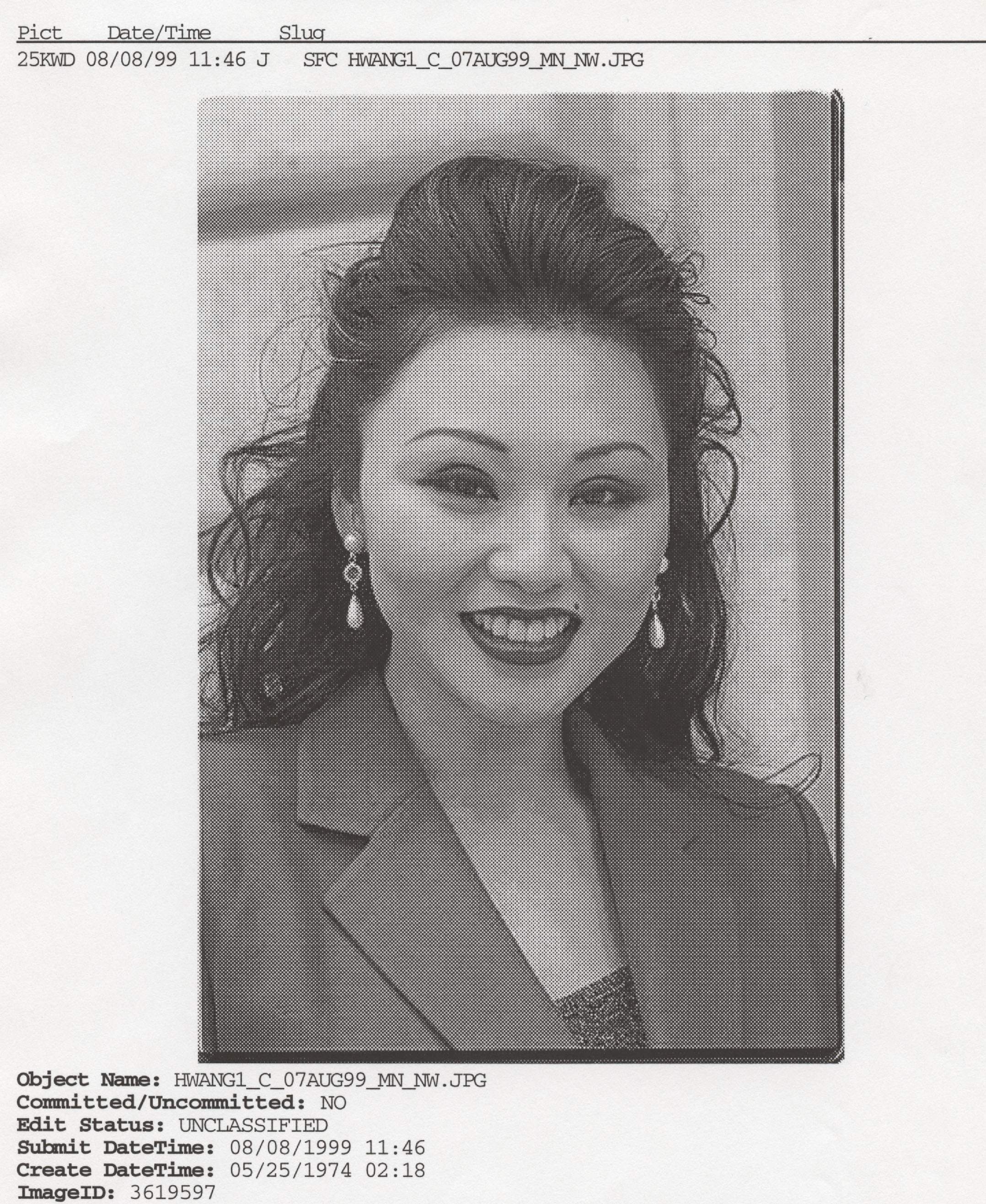
Esther Hwang was Mayor Willie Brown's scheduling secretary in 1999

In 2006, she began working with North Beach Models. In 2007, she filed a police brutality charge in San Francisco. In 2008, Hwang was diagnosed with Stage 1 breast cancer. She continues to work as a model as well as working with her charity, Pandora's Hope, for children in poverty and women with cancer.
