= International Council of Forest and Paper Associations =

The International Council of Forest and Paper Associations (ICFPA) is an international interest group and trade association for the pulp and paper industry.

As of 2024, Heidi Brock, President and CEO of the American Forest & Paper Association (AF&PA), serves as ICFPA's president. ICFPA Vice President is Mr. José Carlos da Fonseca Junior of The Brazilian Tree (Ibá).

== Mission statement ==
ICFPA supports dialogue across regional and national forest products associations from 27 countries around the world and promotes global commitments to sustainable forest management, recycling, innovation, water conservation, mitigating climate change, ensuring a safe and inclusive workplace, and optimizing the use of environmentally-friendly wood and paper-based products

— ICFPA

== Activities ==
The ICFPA is a member of the PEFC, participates in the FAO’s Advisory Committee on Sustainable Forest-based Industries (ACSFI), and cooperates with the ISO committee.

== Members ==
- Australian Forest Products Association (AFPA)
- Brazilian Tree Industry (Ibá)
- Forest Products Association of Canada (FPAC)
- Corporacion Chilena de la Madera (CORMA)
- Confederation of European Paper Industries (CEPI)
- Finnish Forest Industries Federation (FFIF)
- Confederation de l'Industrie Francaise des Papiers, Cartons et Celluloses (COPACEL)
- German Pulp and Paper Association (VDP)
- Japan Paper Association (JPA)
- New Zealand Forest Owners Association (NZFOA)
- Biond: Associação das Bioindústrias de Base Florestal
- Paper Manufacturers Association of South Africa (PAMSA)
- Asociacion Nacional de Fabricantes de Pastas, Papel y Carton (ASPAPEL)
- Swedish Forest Industries Federation (SFIF)
- American Forest & Paper Association (AF&PA)
- Confederation of Paper Industries
