= San José, San Francisco =

San José
- Corregimiento
- Location within Panama
- Coordinates: 8.4833°N 80.8167°W
- Country: Panama
- Province: Veraguas
- District: San Francisco
- Established: January 24, 2003

Area
  - Land: 56.6 km^{2} (21.9 sq mi)

Population (2010)
  - Total: 2,555
  - Density: 45.2/km^{2} (117/sq mi)
- Population density calculated based on land area.
- Time zone: UTC−5 (EST)

San José is a corregimiento in San Francisco District, Veraguas Province, Panama with a population of 2,555 as of 2010. It was created by Law 18 of January 24, 2003.
