= United States Deputy Secretary of Energy =

United States government position

Deputy Secretary of Energy
- Seal of the U. S. Department of Energy

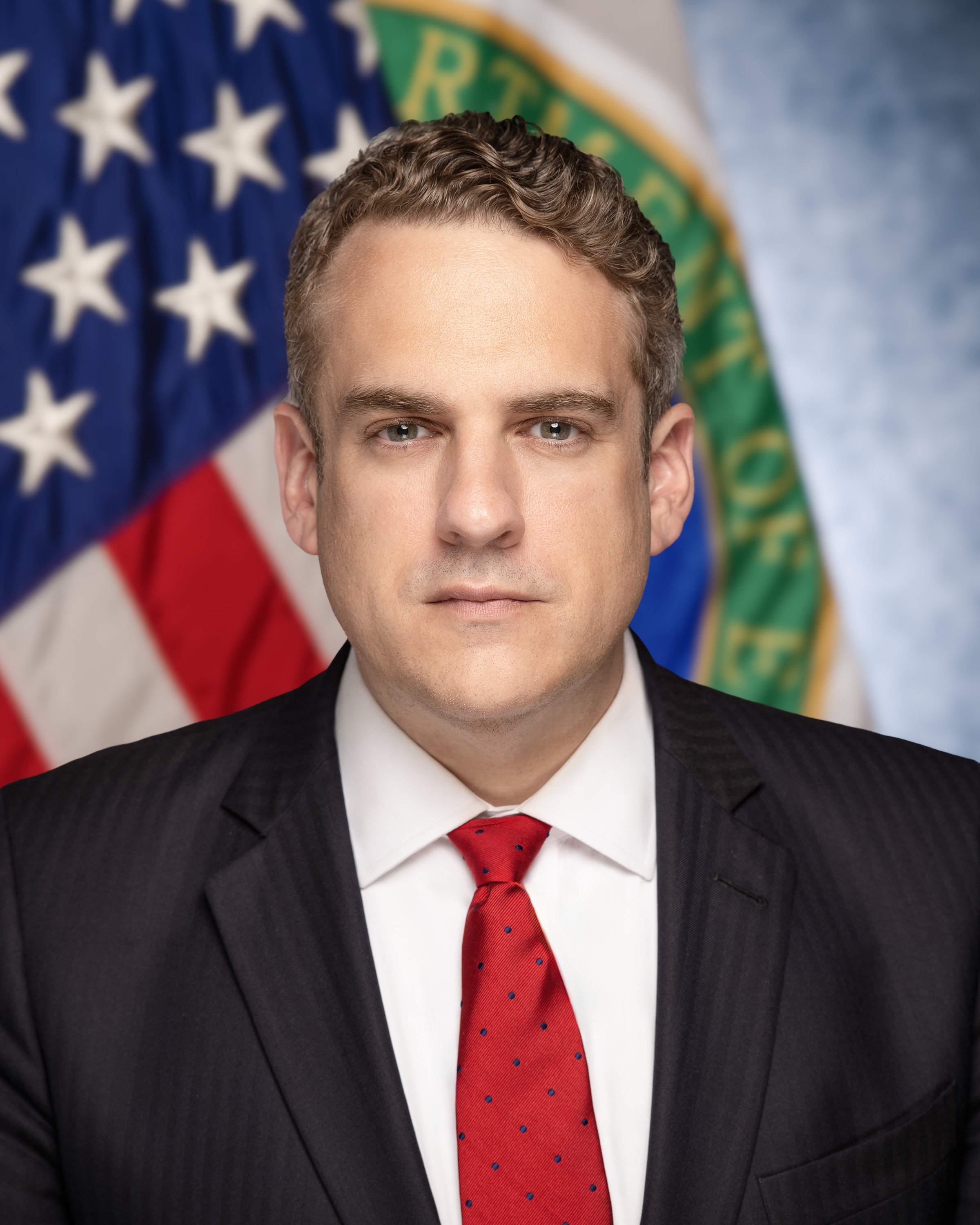
- Incumbent; James Danly since June 11, 2025
- United States Department of Energy
- Reports to: U. S. Secretary of Energy
- Seat: Washington, D.C., United States
- Appointer: The president with Senate advice and consent
- Website: www.energy.gov

The deputy secretary of energy is a high-ranking position within the United States Department of Energy. The deputy secretary is the second-highest-ranking official of the department and assists the secretary of energy in the supervision and direction of the department. The deputy secretary succeeds the secretary in their absence, sickness, or unavailability.

The deputy secretary is appointed by the president with the consent of the United States Senate to serve at the request of the president.

== History ==
The position of deputy secretary of energy was formed on October 1, 1977, with the creation of the Department of Energy when President Jimmy Carter signed the Department of Energy Organization Act.

== Deputy secretaries of energy ==
The following persons served as the deputy secretary of energy:

No.	Image	Deputy secretary	Took office	Left office	Refs.
1		John F. O'Leary	October 21, 1977	September 30, 1979	
2		John C. Sawhill	October 4, 1979	October 8, 1980	
Acting		Lynn Coleman	December 23, 1980	January 20, 1981	
3		W. Kenneth Davis	May 14, 1981	January 13, 1983	
4		Danny Julian Boggs	November 3, 1983	March 25, 1986	
5		William Flynn Martin	June 6, 1986	June 6, 1988	
6		Joseph F. Salgado	May 21, 1988	January 20, 1989	
7		Henson Moore	April 12, 1989	January 31, 1992	
8		Linda Stuntz	January 31, 1992	January 22, 1993	
9		William H. White	June 26, 1993	January 20, 1995	
10		Charles B. Curtis	August 1995	May 1997	
11		Betsy Moler	1997	1998	
12		T.J. Glauthier	March 18, 1999	2001	
13		Frank Blake	June 1, 2001	April 2002	
14		Kyle E. McSlarrow	November 27, 2002	February 2005	
15		Clay Sell	March 17, 2005	February 29, 2008	
Acting		Jeffrey Kupfer	March 1, 2008	January 20, 2009	
16		Daniel Poneman	May 18, 2009	October 5, 2014	
17		Elizabeth Sherwood-Randall	October 10, 2014	January 20, 2017	
18		Dan Brouillette	August 8, 2017	December 4, 2019	
Acting		Mark Menezes	December 4, 2019	August 4, 2020	
19		Mark Menezes	August 4, 2020	January 20, 2021	
20		David Turk	March 25, 2021	January 20, 2025	
21		James Danly	June 11, 2025	Incumbent	
