= List of nuclear engineers =

This is a list of nuclear engineers, noted for their contributions to the field of nuclear engineering.

== A ==
- Yevgeny Adamov (born 1939) – Russian nuclear engineer and former atomic energy minister
- Mohammad Alavi – Iranian nuclear engineer
- Maxime Amblard – French nuclear engineer
- William Anders (1933–2024) – American nuclear engineer and astronaut
- Oleksiy Ananenko – Ukrainian nuclear engineer involved in the Chernobyl disaster response
- Henry Shull Arms (1912–1972) – British-American nuclear engineer and reactor developer

== B ==
- John Baxter – British nuclear engineer
- Arden L. Bement Jr. (born 1932) – American engineer and government official
- Manson Benedict (1907–2006) – American nuclear engineer and nuclear fuel pioneer
- Everitt P. Blizard (1916–1977) – American nuclear engineer specializing in radiation shielding
- Maud Bregeon – French nuclear engineer
- Shelby Brewer (1937–2015) – American nuclear engineer and energy executive
- Sam Brinton – American nuclear engineer and nuclear waste specialist
- Viktor Bryukhanov (1935–2021) – Soviet engineer and Chernobyl plant director
- Alain Bugat – French nuclear engineer
- Parvez Butt – Pakistani nuclear engineer

== C ==
- John M. Carpenter (1935–2020) – American nuclear engineer and neutron-source pioneer
- Cheng Kaijia (1918–2018) – Chinese nuclear engineer and nuclear physicist
- Floyd L. Culler, Jr. (1923–2004) – American nuclear engineer at Oak Ridge National Laboratory

== D ==
- Leslie Dewan (born 1984) – American nuclear engineer and entrepreneur
- James Duderstadt (1942–2024) – American nuclear engineer and university administrator
- Anatoly Dyatlov (1931–1995) – Soviet nuclear engineer at the Chernobyl Nuclear Power Plant

== E ==
- Mohamed El-Genk – American nuclear engineer specializing in nuclear and space power
- Akbar Etemad – Iranian nuclear engineer
- Julie Ezold – American nuclear engineer specializing in isotope production

== F ==
- Harold Finger (1924–2017) – American nuclear engineer involved in nuclear space programs
- Nikolai Fomin – Soviet nuclear engineer at the Chernobyl Nuclear Power Plant

== G ==
- B. John Garrick (1930–2020) – American nuclear engineer and risk analysis specialist
- A. Gopalakrishnan – Indian nuclear engineer
- Masashi Gotō – Japanese nuclear engineer
- Arnold Gundersen (born 1949) – American nuclear engineer and energy consultant

== H ==
- J'Tia Hart – American nuclear engineer
- Christopher Hinton, Baron Hinton of Bankside (1901–1983) – British nuclear engineer
- William Nicholas Hitchon – British nuclear engineer
- Kathryn Huff – American nuclear engineer and government official

== I ==
- Sue Ion – British nuclear engineer

== K ==
- Munir Ahmad Khan (1926–1999) – Pakistani nuclear engineer and nuclear program administrator
- Edwin E. Kintner (1920–2010) – American nuclear engineer and energy administrator
- Dale E. Klein – American nuclear engineer and former NRC chairman
- Milton Klein (1924–2011) – American nuclear engineer
- Maria Korsnick – American nuclear engineer and industry executive
- Herbert J.C. Kouts (1919–2008) – American nuclear engineer and reactor safety pioneer
- Way Kuo – Taiwanese nuclear engineer

== L ==
- John Large (1943–2018) – British nuclear engineer
- John D. Lawson (1923–2008) – British nuclear engineer and physicist
- Richard K. Lester – American nuclear engineer and MIT professor
- Ju Li – Chinese nuclear engineer and materials scientist
- David Lochbaum – American nuclear engineer and nuclear safety specialist

== M ==
- Herbert G. MacPherson (1911–1993) – American nuclear engineer and reactor developer
- Sultan Bashiruddin Mahmood – Pakistani nuclear engineer
- Arjun Makhijani (born 1947) – American nuclear engineer and energy researcher
- Gail Marcus – American nuclear engineer and policy specialist
- Yahya El Mashad (1932–1980) – Egyptian nuclear engineer
- Takashi Mukaibo (1917–2002) – Japanese nuclear engineer
- Samar Mubarakmand – Pakistani nuclear engineer

== N ==
- Kenneth Nichols (1907–2000) – American engineer involved in the Manhattan Project

== O ==
- Donald R. Olander – American nuclear engineer specializing in nuclear materials

== P ==
- M. P. Parameswaran – Indian nuclear engineer
- Alan Parkinson – Australian nuclear engineer
- Peng Shilu (1925–2021) – Chinese nuclear engineer
- Ansar Pervaiz – Pakistani nuclear engineer and former chairman of the Pakistan Atomic Energy Commission
- Thomas H. Pigford (1922–2010) – American nuclear engineer and nuclear safety researcher
- Sara Pozzi – Italian-American nuclear engineer specializing in radiation detection

== R ==
- Norman Rasmussen (1927–2003) – American nuclear engineer and reactor safety researcher
- David J. Rose (1922–1985) – American nuclear engineer and MIT professor

== S ==
- Mehdi Sarram – Iranian-American nuclear engineer
- Zalman Shapiro (1920–2016) – American nuclear engineer and inventor
- Milton Shaw (1912–1982) – American nuclear engineer and reactor developer
- Carol Smidts – Belgian-American nuclear engineer specializing in nuclear safety
- M. R. Srinivasan (1930–2025) – Indian nuclear engineer
- Chauncey Starr (1912–2007) – American nuclear engineer and risk analysis pioneer
- Nikolai Steinberg – Ukrainian nuclear engineer and nuclear safety official

== T ==
- Rusi Taleyarkhan – Indian-American nuclear engineer
- John E. Till – American nuclear engineer and radiation protection specialist

== V ==
- Rumina Velshi – Canadian nuclear engineer and regulator
- Jasmina Vujic – Serbian-American nuclear engineer and professor

== W ==
- Alan Waltar – American nuclear engineer specializing in fast reactors
- Laurence Williams – British nuclear engineer
- Paul Wilson – American nuclear engineer and professor
- Brian Wirth – American nuclear engineer and materials scientist

== Y ==
- Bilge Yıldız – Turkish-American nuclear engineer and materials scientist
- Masao Yoshida (1955–2013) – Japanese nuclear engineer

== See also ==
- List of Nobel laureates who worked on the Manhattan Project
- List of engineers
- List of physicists
- List of nuclear science journals
