= Office of Nuclear Energy =

US government agency

- Seal of the Department of Energy

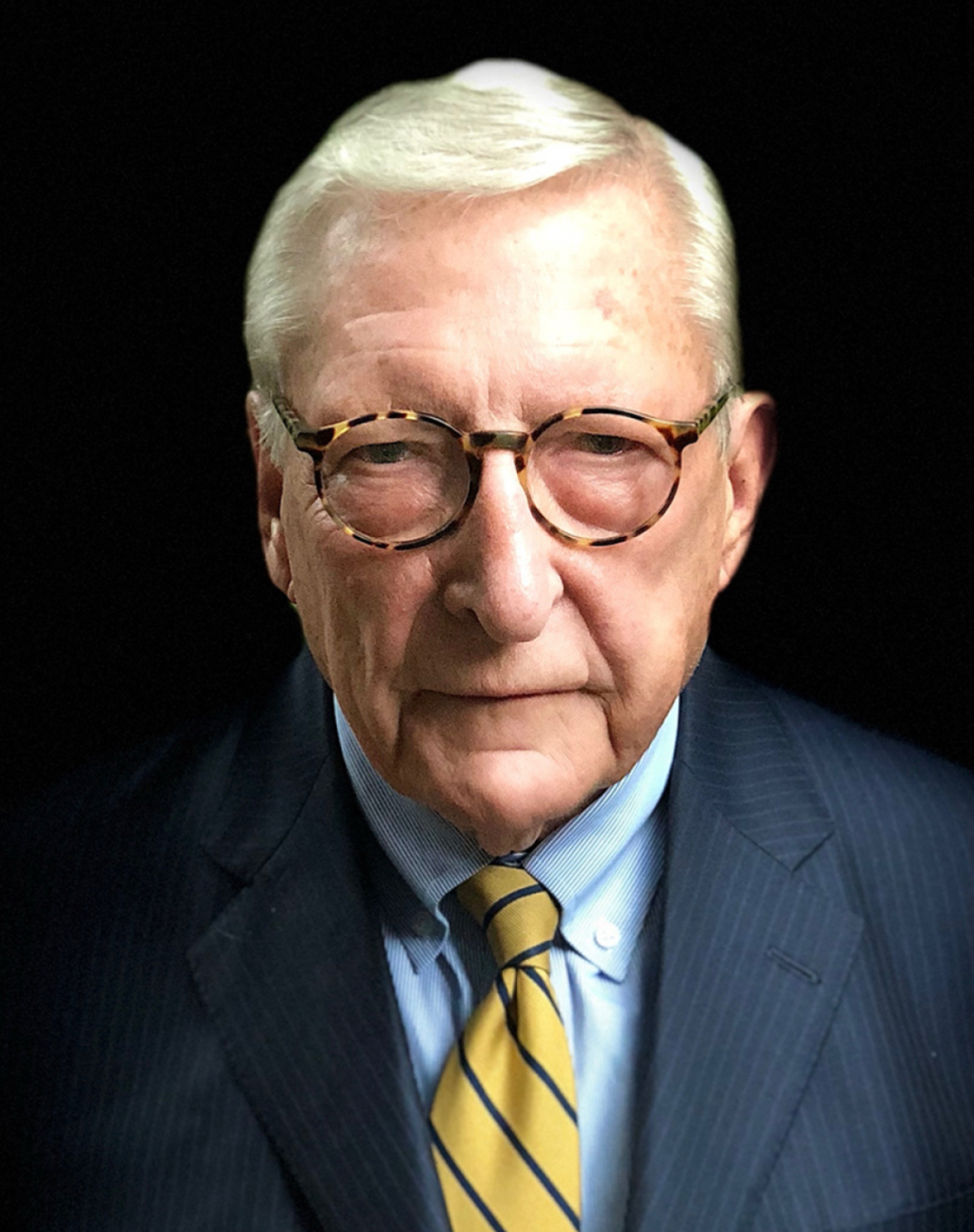
- Incumbent; Theodore J. Garrish; Assistant Secretary of Energy for Nuclear Energy since September 26, 2025
- United States Department of Energy
- Reports to: Under Secretary of Energy for Science and Innovation
- Appointer: President of the United States
- Formation: April 3, 2006
- First holder: Dennis Spurgeon

The Office of Nuclear Energy (NE) is an agency of the United States Department of Energy which promotes nuclear power as a resource capable of meeting the energy, environmental, and national security needs of the United States by resolving technical and regulatory barriers through research, development, and demonstration.

The office is led by the assistant secretary of Energy for Nuclear Energy, who is appointed by the president of the United States with the advice and consent of the United States Senate. The current acting assistant secretary of Energy for Nuclear Energy is Michael Goff.

== Overview ==
The Office of Nuclear Energy is guided by the following four research objectives detailed in its Nuclear Energy Research and Development Roadmap:

- Develop technologies and other solutions that can improve the reliability, sustain the safety and extend the life of current reactors.
- Develop improvements in the affordability of new reactors to enable nuclear energy to help meet the administration's energy security and climate change goals.
- Develop sustainable fuel cycles.
- Understand and minimize the risks of nuclear proliferation and terrorism.

== Organization ==
The office is under the general supervision of the Under Secretary of Energy for Science and Innovation. It is administered by the assistant secretary of Energy for Nuclear Energy (NE-1), who is appointed by the president of the United States. The assistant secretary is supported in running the office by a principal deputy assistant secretary and five career deputy assistant secretaries. Each of the five deputy assistant secretaries oversees a different branch of the office's work. As of 2022, staffing and organization were as follows:

- Assistant Secretary
  - Principal Deputy Assistant Secretary
    - Acting Deputy Assistant Secretary – Nuclear Infrastructure Programs - Timothy Beville
    - Acting Deputy Assistant Secretary – Spent Fuel and Waste Disposition - Marla Morales
    - Deputy Assistant Secretary – Nuclear Fuel Cycle and Supply Chain - Dr. Joshua Jarrell
    - Deputy Assistant Secretary – International Nuclear Energy Policy and Cooperation - Aleshia Duncan
    - Deputy Acting Assistant Secretary – Reactor Fleet and Advanced Reactor Deployment - Michelle Scott

== Laboratory ==
The Office of Nuclear Energy is the landlord of the Idaho National Laboratory (INL). INL is in southern Idaho, just west of the Eastern Snake River Plain. It occupies 890 square miles (2,300 km^{2}) of desert and is about 42 miles (68 km) from Idaho Falls.

INL is an applied engineering laboratory dedicated to supporting the U.S. Department of Energy's research of nuclear energy, national and homeland security, and clean energy. Past and current work includes initial development of nuclear reactor designs, prototype reactors for the U.S. Navy, and technologies to manage nuclear waste. INL also conducts research supporting fuel cycle development, as well as nuclear energy demos and deployments.

=== Lab history ===
INL was established in 1949 as the National Reactor Testing Station by the Atomic Energy Commission. It is the location of historic Experimental Breeder Reactor Number I (EBR-I), the first nuclear reactor to generate usable electrical power.

== CASL Hub ==
The Consortium for the Advanced Simulation of Light Water Reactors (CASL) was established in July 2010 as the first of five Department of Energy Innovation Hubs. It was administered by the Office of Nuclear Energy, and coordinated by Oak Ridge National Lab and INL. CASL had one goal: To develop a simulation environment that modeled the operation of an entire reactor down to the characteristics of a single fuel rod (which significantly exceeded the resolution available with existing industry tools). This simulation environment was named the Virtual Reactor. The Virtual Reactor was designed and built to provide solutions to a wide variety of reactor performance challenges.

In order to develop what was eventually called the Virtual Environment for Reactor Applications (VERA), it was necessary for CASL to conduct both basic research and technology development. Work of such scope and complexity was accomplished through a partnership of U.S. government, academia, and industry. In 2020, the CASL project concluded, making VERA available for licensing and deployment by the nuclear industry.

== List of assistant secretaries ==
The assistant secretary of Energy for Nuclear Energy is the head of the Office of Nuclear Energy. The assistant secretary is responsible for a budget of $1.626 billion, as of fiscal year 2021.

Parties

Democratic Republican

Status

Acting Assistant Secretary of Energy for Nuclear Energy

| No. | Portrait | Name | Took office | Left office | Refs. | President(s) |
|---|---|---|---|---|---|---|
| 1 | | George W. Cunningham | 1979 | 1981 | | Jimmy Carter |
| 2 | | Shelby Brewer | 1981 | 1984 | | Ronald Reagan |
| acting | | James W. Vaughan, Jr. | 1984 | 1986 | | Ronald Reagan |
| 3 | | A. David Rossin | 1986 | 1987 | | Ronald Reagan |
| 4 | | Theodore J. Garrish | 1987 | 1989 | | Ronald Reagan |
| 5 | | William H. Young | 1989 | 1993 | | George H. W. Bush |
| 6 | | | | | | Bill Clinton |
| 7 | | William D. Magwood, IV (Note: Magwood is the 8th and current director-general of the Nuclear Energy Agency since 2014.) | November 10, 1998 | 2005 | | |
| acting | | R. Shane Johnson | May 2005 | April 3, 2006 | | George W. Bush |
| 8 | | Dennis Spurgeon | April 4, 2006 | January 2009 | | George W. Bush |
| 9 | | Pete Miller | August 2009 | November 2010 | | Barack Obama |
| acting | | Peter Lyons | November 2010 | April 14, 2011 | | Barack Obama |
| 10 | | Peter Lyons | April 14, 2011 | June 30, 2015 | | Barack Obama |
| acting | | John Kotek | July 1, 2015 | January 20, 2017 | | Barack Obama |
| acting | | Raymond Furstenau | January 20, 2017 | May 31, 2017 | | Donald Trump |
| acting | | Edward McGinnis | May 31, 2017 | July 10, 2019 | | Donald Trump |
| 11 | | Rita Baranwal | July 11, 2019 | January 8, 2021 | | Donald Trump |
| acting | | Dennis Michael Miotla | January 8, 2021 | May 10, 2021 | | Joe Biden |
| acting | | Kathryn Huff | May 10, 2021 | January 19, 2022 | | Joe Biden |
| acting | | Andrew Griffith | January 19, 2022 | May 11, 2022 | | Joe Biden |
| 12 | | Kathryn Huff | May 11, 2022 | May 3, 2024 | | Joe Biden |
| acting | | Michael Goff | May 3, 2024 | September 26, 2025 | | Joe Biden |
| 13 | | Theodore J. Garrish | September 26, 2025 | Present | | Donald Trump |

Table notes:

== See also ==
- Advanced Fuel Cycle Initiative
- High-temperature electrolysis
