= Dennis Spurgeon =

American nuclear engineer (born 1943)

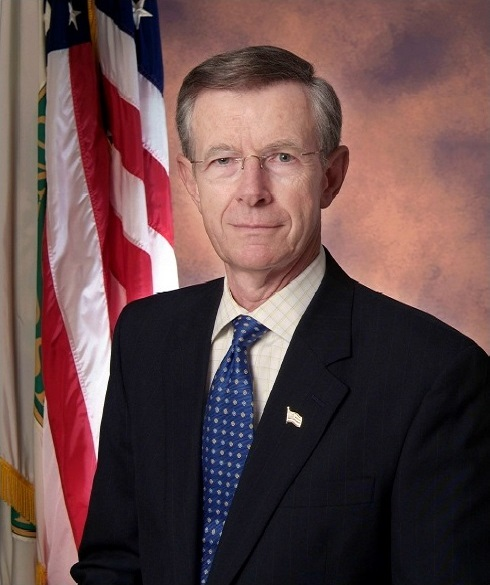

Assistant Secretary of Energy for Nuclear Energy
- In office April 3, 2006 – 2009
- President: George W. Bush
- Preceded by: William H. Young
- Succeeded by: Warren F. Miller Jr.

Personal details
- Born: October 23, 1943 (age 83)
- Education: United States Naval Academy, Massachusetts Institute of Technology (MS)

Military service
- Allegiance: United States of America
- Branch/service: United States Navy
- Rank: Captain

Dennis Ray Spurgeon (born October 23, 1943) is a former Assistant Secretary for Nuclear Energy within the United States Department of Energy. He was sworn in on April 3, 2006, becoming the most senior nuclear technology official in the American government. In addition, he is the leader of the Global Nuclear Energy Partnership, a strategy aimed at accelerating the demonstration of a more proliferation resistant closed fuel cycle and reducing the possibility that nuclear energy could be used for non-peaceful purposes. In his capacity as Assistant Secretary, he has previously served as Acting Under Secretary of Energy for Energy and Environment.

== Career and education ==
Prior to becoming Assistant Secretary for Nuclear Energy, Dennis Spurgeon was executive vice president and chief operating officer for USEC, Inc., an international supplier of enriched uranium for nuclear plants. Prior to that, he was chairman, chief executive officer, and principal owner of Swiftships, an international company in shipbuilding for commercial and military markets. He had held posts in the Gerald Ford administration, including assistant director for Fuel Cycle in the U.S. Energy Research and Development Administration. He was also a member of a White House task force that developed Ford's policy on nuclear energy.

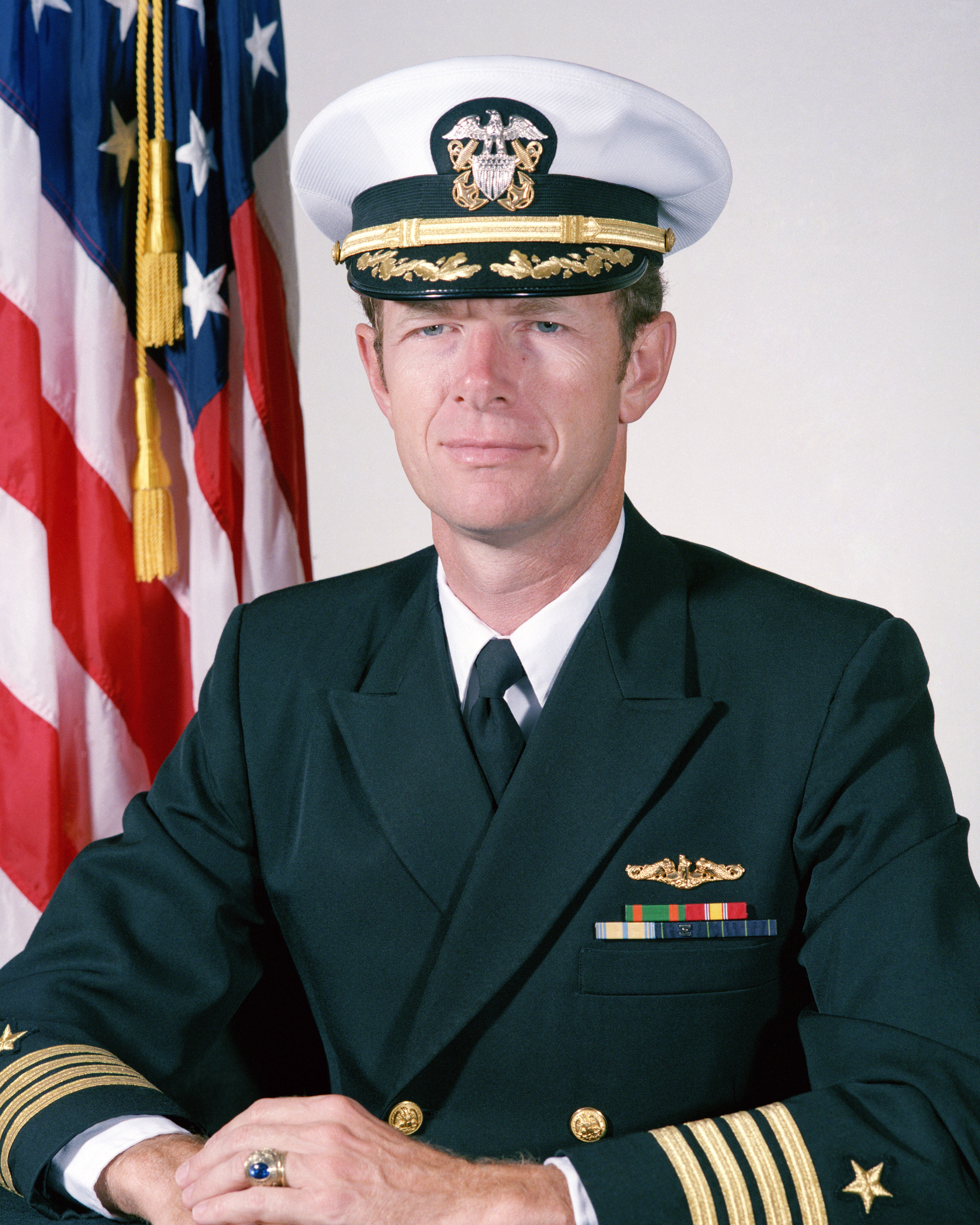
Navy Capt. Spurgeon in 1986

Spurgeon served in the United States Navy, achieving the rank of captain. During his time as a U.S. Naval officer, he served as technical assistant to Commissioner Tommy Thompson and later to Dr. Glenn Seaborg, Chairman of the United States Atomic Energy Commission and the predecessor agency of the department. He also held executive positions at the former United Nuclear Corporation, where, as chief operating officer, he managed the manufacturing of reactor cores for the Navy and operation of the Department's former N-reactor, located at the Hanford Reservation. He previously worked for the General Atomic Company, where he assisted in the development of nuclear reactor plants for electric power generation.

Dennis Spurgeon graduated from the U.S. Naval Academy. He holds a Master of Science degree in nuclear engineering and the post-master's degree of Nuclear Engineer from the Massachusetts Institute of Technology.

== Assistant Secretary for Nuclear Energy ==
Dennis Spurgeon has said that because of the Nuclear Power 2010 Program, under which the Department of Energy is cost-sharing the preparation of early nuclear power plant site permits, he expects announcements of new power plants before President George W. Bush leaves office, and the beginning of construction by 2010. He told the U.S. Senate Subcommittee on Water and Development Appropriations that additional repositories for nuclear waste are needed, as the Yucca Mountain nuclear waste repository will be oversubscribed by 2010. He also manages the Advanced Fuel Cycle Initiative program. Under the program, the U.S. attempts to recycle spent nuclear fuel using advanced technology while reducing nuclear proliferation and the amount of nuclear wastes requiring permanent geological disposal.

Assistant Secretary Spurgeon has termed the conditions brought about by popular demand for a clean alternative to fossil fuels and global warming a "global renaissance" for the nuclear industry. He has said that Australia and Canada would be given special consideration in the development of the uranium enrichment industry, because they would play a pivotal role in a new nuclear suppliers club that the United States is trying to establish.

Preceded by William H. Young	Assistant Secretary for Nuclear Energy; 2006–2009	Succeeded by Warren F. Miller Jr.
