= AFCI =

AFCI may refer to:

- Advanced Fuel Cycle Initiative
- Arc-Fault Circuit Interrupter
- Association of Film Commissioners International
