= Peter B. Lyons =

American nuclear physicist (1943–2021)

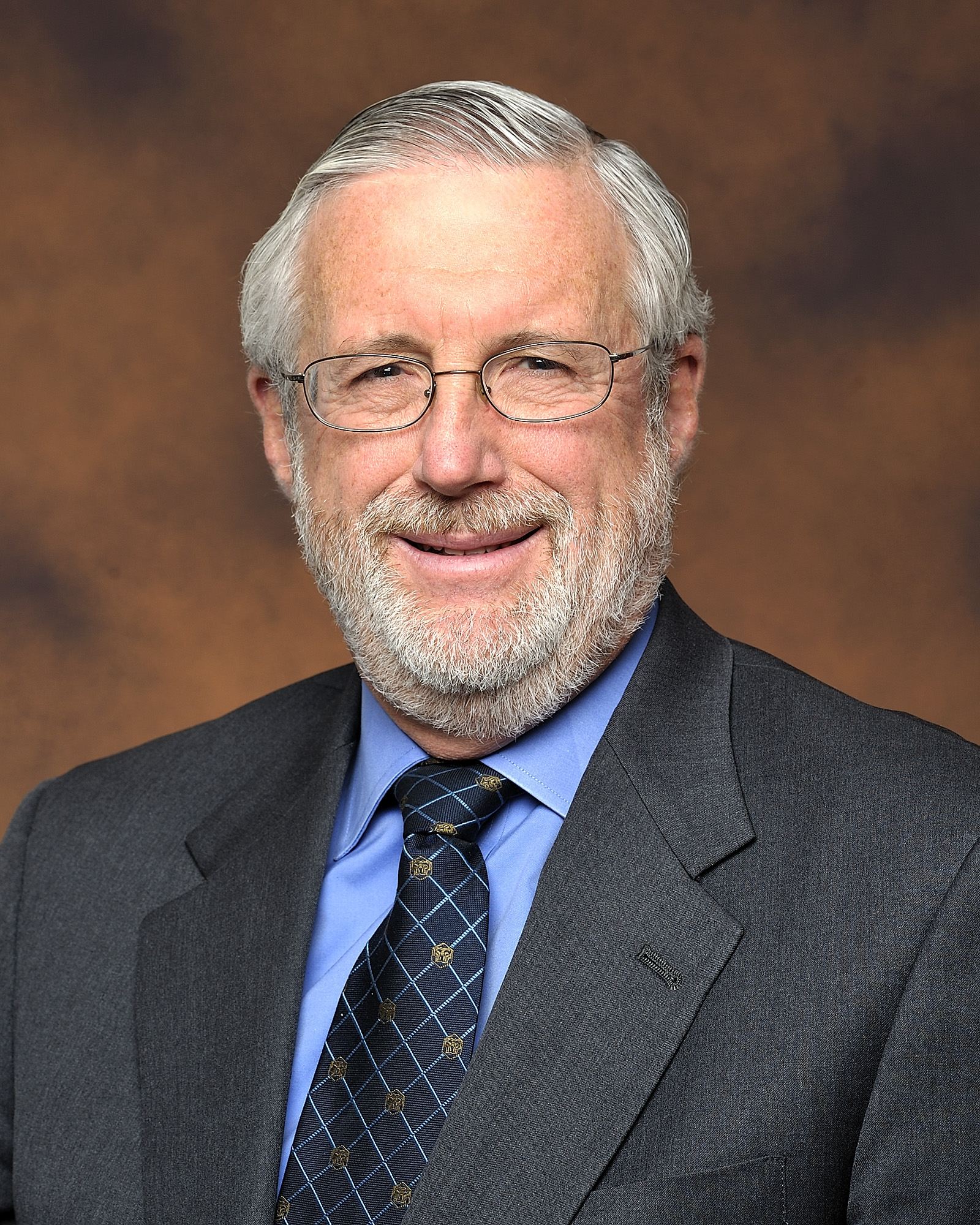

Assistant Secretary of Energy for Nuclear Energy
- In office April 14, 2011 – June 30, 2015
- Preceded by: Warren F. Miller Jr.
- Succeeded by: Rita Baranwal

Personal details
- Born: February 23, 1943 Hammond, Indiana
- Died: April 29, 2021 (aged 78) Golden, Colorado
- Education: University of Arizona, California Institute of Technology

Peter Bruce Lyons (February 23, 1943 – April 29, 2021) was confirmed by the US Senate as the Assistant Secretary of Energy for Nuclear Energy on April 14, 2011. He was appointed to his previous role as Principal Deputy Assistant Secretary of the Office of Nuclear Energy in September, 2009. As Assistant Secretary, Dr. Lyons was responsible for all programs and activities of the Office of Nuclear Energy. He retired from the Department of Energy on June 30, 2015.

Peter B. Lyons was sworn in as a Commissioner of the Nuclear Regulatory Commission on January 25, 2005, and served until his term ended on June 30, 2009. At the NRC, Dr. Lyons focused on the safety of operating nuclear reactors and on the importance of learning from operating experience, even as new reactor licensing and possible construction emerged. He claimed that the NRC and its licensees remain strong and vigilant components of the US integrated defenses against terrorism, and was a voice for improving partnerships with international regulatory agencies. He emphasized research programs to support sound regulatory decisions, address current issues and anticipate future ones. He was also a proponent of science and technology education, recruiting for diversity, employee training and development programs, and an open and collaborative working environment.

From 1969 to 1996, Dr. Lyons worked in progressively more responsible positions at the Los Alamos National Laboratory. During that time he served as Director for Industrial Partnerships, Deputy Associate Director for Energy and Environment, and Deputy Associate Director-Defense Research and Applications. While at Los Alamos, he spent over a decade supporting nuclear test diagnostics. Before becoming a Commissioner, Dr. Lyons served as Science Advisor on the staff of U.S. Senator Pete Domenici and the Senate Committee on Energy and Natural Resources where he focused on military and civilian uses of nuclear technology, national science policy, and nuclear non-proliferation. Dr. Lyons has published more than 100 technical papers, holds three patents related to fiber optics and plasma diagnostics, and served as chairman of the NATO Nuclear Effects Task Group for five years.

Dr. Lyons was raised in Nevada. He received his doctorate in nuclear astrophysics from the California Institute of Technology in 1969 and earned his undergraduate degree in physics and mathematics from the University of Arizona in 1964. Dr. Lyons is a Fellow of the American Nuclear Society, a Fellow of the American Physical Society, was elected to 16 years on the Los Alamos School Board, and spent six years on the University of New Mexico-Los Alamos Branch Advisory Board. He was a resident of the District of Columbia.
