= David J. Rose =

MIT Nuclear Engineering professor

Professor David John Rose
- Rose Official Portrait, 1960.
- Born: May 8, 1922; Victoria, British Columbia, Canada
- Died: October 24, 1985 (aged 63); Cambridge, Massachusetts, US
- Occupations: Professor, Nuclear Engineering
- Years active: 1958–1984
- Known for: Scientist, engineer; Policy analyst; Bridge to religious community
- Board member of: 1965-66 Chairman Plasma Physics Division of American Physical Society
- Spouse(s): (unknown-divorced); Renate Papke
- Children: 3
- Awards: Fellow of American Academy of Arts & Sciences, American Physical Society, American Association for the Advancement of Science, Arthur Holly Compton Award of American Nuclear Society for excellence in teaching, 8th recipient of James R. Killian, Jr. Faculty Achievement Award

Academic background
- Education: University of British Columbia, BA in Science, 1947; MIT Physics PhD, 1950
- Thesis: (1950)
- Academic advisors: William Allis, Sanborn C. Brown

Academic work
- Discipline: Physicist, Engineer
- Institutions: Royal Canadian Artillery; Bell Telephone Laboratory; MIT; Oak Ridge National Laboratory
- Doctoral students: Richard K. Lester
- Main interests: Plasma Physics, Fusion technology, Energy technology and policy

David John Rose (May 8, 1922 - October 24, 1985) was a Canadian born- American nuclear engineer and environmentalist.

He was a professor of nuclear energy at MIT and a consultant for the Environmental Protection Agency.

== Education ==
Rose received a B.A.Sc. degree in engineering physics from the University of British Columbia in 1947 and a Ph.D. degree in physics from MIT in 1950. He joined the faculty of the Department of Nuclear Engineering at MIT when it was formed in 1958.

== Work history ==
Rose served as captain in the Canadian artillery from 1942 to 1947. He worked at Bell Laboratories until joining the MIT Nuclear Engineering faculty in 1958. He led the development of the department's program in plasmas and controlled fusion, and was on the MIT faculty for the rest of his professional career. From 1969 to 1971, during a two-year leave of absence, he worked at Oak Ridge National Laboratory, where he was the first director of their office of Long-range planning.

Rose's career was said to have three phases: scientist and engineer; technology/policy analyst; and "bridge builder" between scientific and theological communities.

== Publications, testimony and other history ==
Rose wrote over 150 articles ranging from high technology to theology. He was author of the widely cited Plasmas and Controlled Fusion, with Melville Clark, which became the standard textbook in the field of fusion energy.

In 1975 Rose taught the MIT Nuclear Engineering Department's first course on sustainable energy.

He testified to Congress in 1977. He was the primary author of Learning about Energy, published posthumously in 1986.

Rose was thesis supervisor for Richard K. Lester.

Shortly before his death, and days before he was hospitalized, Rose wrote an article opposing Star Wars (SDI) and asking for support for a petition against it.

== Honors, Awards and recognitions ==
- Fellow of the American Academy of Arts and Sciences
- Fellow of the American Physical Society
- Fellow of the American Academy for the Advancement of Science.
- 1975 Arthur Holly Compton Award of the American Nuclear Society for excellence in teaching
- James R Killian Jr Faculty Achievement Award and lecturer in 1979–80
- 1984 David J. Rose Lecture was established in his honor, to recognize his work in fusion technology, energy and environment impact, nuclear waste management, and ethical issues of science and technology.
- 1986 Fusion Power Associates established an annual prize for excellence in fusion engineering in Rose's honor.

== Personal life and death ==
Rose was divorced from his first marriage, with whom he had three children, a daughter Elizabeth and two sons, Hugh and Andrew. His second marriage was to Renate Papke.

Rose retired in December 1984, and moved to Honolulu, HI.

Rose died on October 24, 1985 from emphasema.

In the 2026 Tom McCarthy film A Statement, he is portrayed by actor John Turturro.
