= Theodore J. Garrish =

American government official (born 1943)

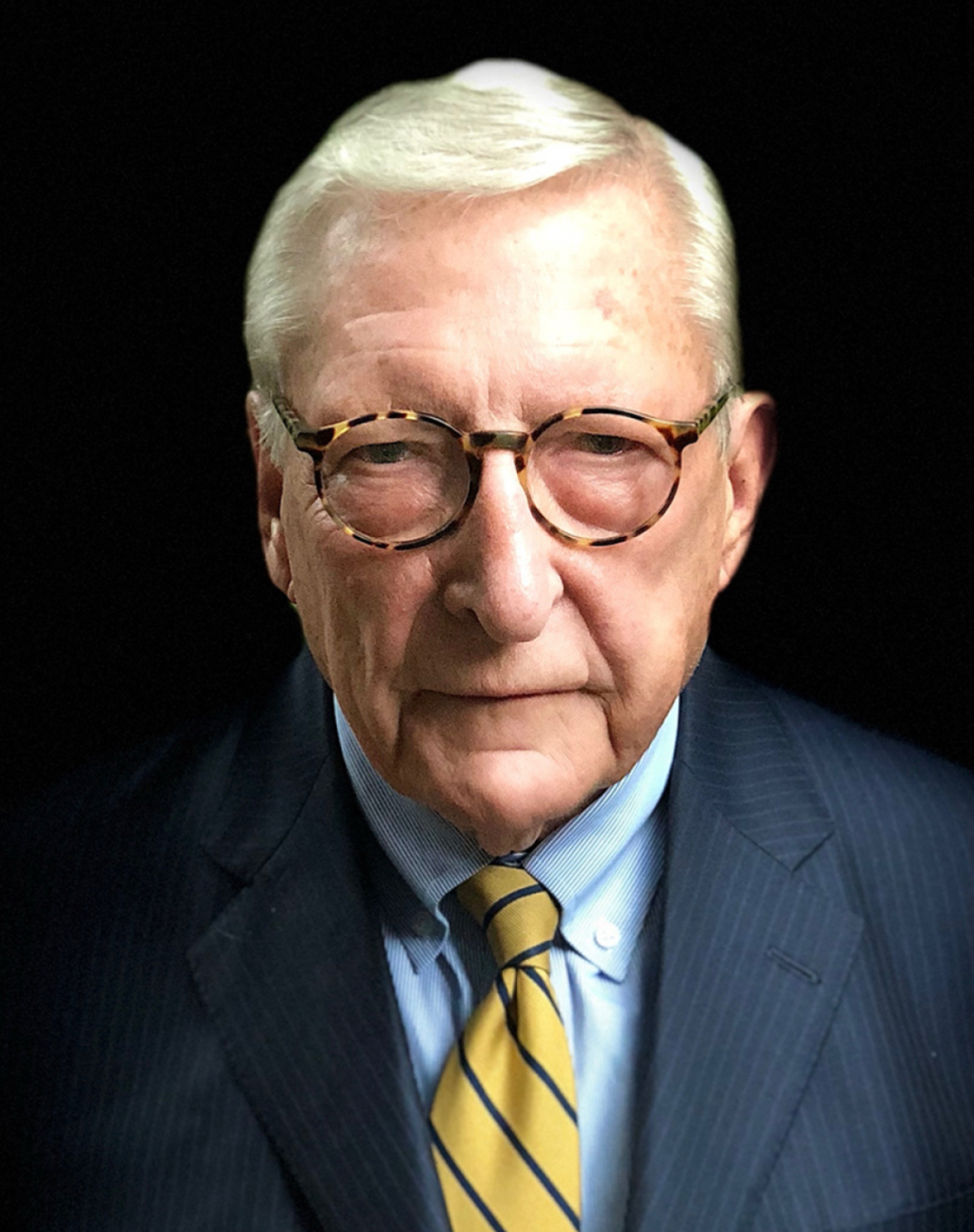
- Official portrait, 2025

4th and 13th Assistant Secretary of Energy for Nuclear Energy
- Incumbent
- Assumed office September 26, 2025
- President: Donald Trump
- Preceded by: Kathryn Huff
- In office 1987–1989
- President: Ronald Reagan
- Preceded by: A. David Rossin
- Succeeded by: William H. Young

Assistant Secretary of Energy for International Affairs
- In office April 12, 2018 – January 20, 2021
- President: Donald Trump

Personal details
- Born: January 6, 1943 (age 83) Detroit, Michigan, U.S.
- Party: Republican
- Education: University of Michigan; Wayne State University Law School

Theodore John Garrish (born January 6, 1943) is an American politician and attorney. He served as the Assistant Secretary of Energy for International Affairs, nominated to the position by President Donald Trump and confirmed by the United States Senate in April 2018. In February 2025, he was nominated by Trump to serve again as the Department of Energy's assistant secretary for nuclear energy and was confirmed in September 2025.

Garrish was born in Detroit, Michigan. He graduated from the University of Michigan with a degree in economics, and received his Juris Doctor degree from Wayne State University Law School. At the start of his federal career, Garrish worked as legislative counsel at the United States Department of the Interior during the Nixon administration.

Garrish served as the United States Department of Energy's General Counsel, Assistant Secretary for Nuclear Energy, and Assistant Secretary for Congressional, Intergovernmental and Public Affairs. He also served as Federal Inspector of the Alaskan Natural Gas Transportation System. Garrish was a member of the Price–Anderson Nuclear Commission and the Civil Nuclear Trade Advisory Committee (CINTAC).
