= Rita Baranwal =

American government official

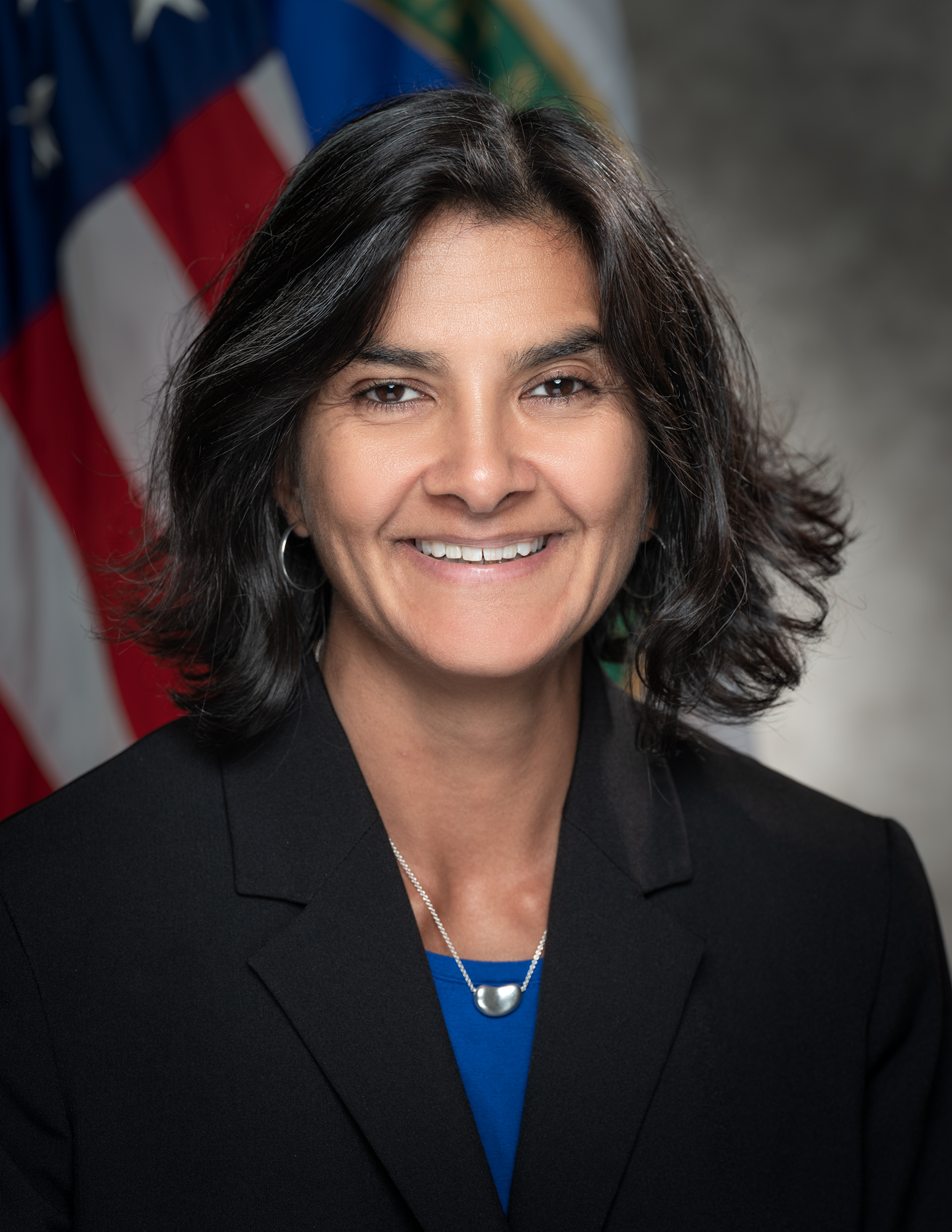

Assistant Secretary of Energy for Nuclear Energy
- In office July 8, 2019 – January 8, 2021
- President: Donald Trump
- Preceded by: Peter B. Lyons
- Succeeded by: Kathryn Huff

Personal details
- Spouse: Peter
- Children: 2
- Parent: Krishna & Arti
- Education: Massachusetts Institute of Technology (BS); University of Michigan (MS, PhD)

Rita Baranwal served as the former Assistant Secretary of Energy for Nuclear Energy, the head of the Office of Nuclear Energy within the United States Department of Energy. She was confirmed to that position by the Senate on June 20, 2019, sworn in on July 11, and served until January 2021. She previously served as the Director of the Gateway for Accelerated Innovation in Nuclear (GAIN) initiative at Idaho National Laboratory starting in that role in August 2016. She previously served as the Chief Technology Officer and Senior Vice President of Digital and Innovation for Westinghouse Electric Company; currently serving as the Senior Vice President of AP300 SMR.

== Education ==
Baranwal holds a bachelor's degree from Massachusetts Institute of Technology in materials science and engineering and a master's degree and PH.D. in the same discipline from the University of Michigan.

== Career ==
Prior to joining the US Department of Energy Baranwal was at Bechtel Bettis, Inc. as the Manager in Materials Technology where she managed research and development regarding advanced nuclear fuel materials for US Naval Reactors. She then worked at Westinghouse Electric Company in multiple roles including Director of Core Engineering, Manager of Materials and Fuel Rod Design, and the Director of Technology Development & Application.

Since 2008 she has been an active American Nuclear Society (ANS) member and served as Vice Chair on the ANS Materials Science and Technology Division (MSTD) Executive Committee. She also served on the Board of Directors for North Hills Community Outreach.
