= Suzanne Berger =

American political scientist

Suzanne D. Berger
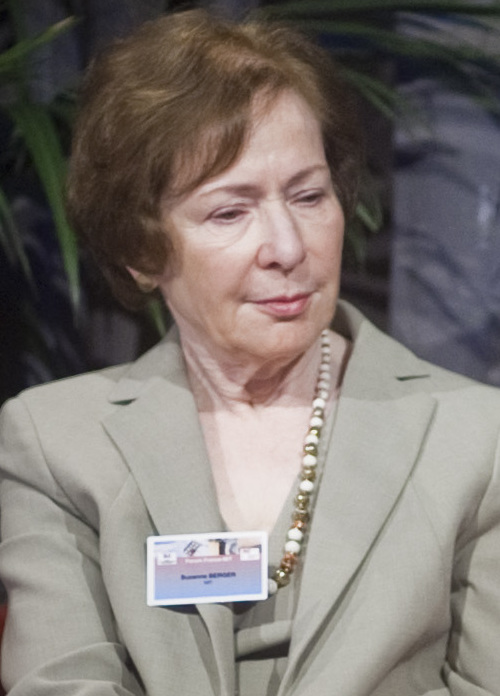
- Suzanne Berger in 2011
- Education: Harvard University; University of Chicago
- Scientific career
- Fields: Political science
- Workplaces: Massachusetts Institute of Technology

Suzanne Doris Berger (born 1939) is an American political scientist. She is the Raphael Dorman and Helen Starbuck Professor of Political Science at the Massachusetts Institute of Technology (MIT) and director of the MIT International Science and Technology Initiative. A leading authority in comparative politics and political economy, she has pointed to the centrality of politics in mediating and redirecting ostensibly transcendent forces, such as economic modernization and globalization.

== Education ==
She attended Antioch College for two years before transferring to the University of Chicago where she received her B.A. with honors in 1960. She then studied at Harvard University, where she received both an M.A. and Ph.D.

== Career ==
Berger joined the faculty at the Massachusetts Institute of Technology (MIT) in 1968. She published her first book, Peasants against Politics, in 1972, which included articles related to French politics in light of industrialization. During her time at MIT, she was elected a Fellow of the American Academy of Arts and Sciences in 1978. By 1995, she was elected Director of MIT's International Science and Technology Initiative and appointed the Raphael Dorman and Helen Starbuck Professor. She also developed a new subject called "Globalization" to be taught in the political science department.

During the 2002–03 academic year, she received the Dean's Award for Distinguished Service to the School of Humanities, Arts, and Social Science. In her 2005 book How We Compete, based on a five-year study by the MIT Industrial Performance Center, she presents the result of case studies of over 500 international companies to discover which practices are succeeding in today’s global economy, which are failing, and why. She paints a far more complicated picture than the black-and-white presentations by most promoters and opponents of globalization. Cheap labor is not the answer, offshoring is not a fatality, and the avenues open to companies are much wider than is generally imagined. She was appointed chevalier of France's Légion d'Honneur in 2009.

Berger was a member of the MIT Commission on Industrial Productivity, whose report, Made in America, analyzed weaknesses and strengths in U.S. industry in the 1980s. She is also a Research Associate and member of the Committee of the Minda de Gunzburg Center for European Studies at Harvard University.

She served as Vice President of the American Political Science Association and as founding Chair of the Social Science Research Council Joint Committee on Western Europe. She is the former chair of the Political Science department at MIT. In addition to heading the MIT International Science and Technology Initiative, she is also the founder and director of the MIT-France Program there.

In 2019, Berger was appointed the inaugural John M. Deutch Institute Professor, the highest faculty honor at MIT.

== Works ==
- Peasants Against Politics: Rural Organization in Brittany, 1911-1967. Cambridge, Massachusetts: Harvard University Press, 1972
  - French updated version: Les Paysans contre la politique. Paris: Seuil, 1975
- The French Political System. New York: Random House, 1974
- The Utilization of the Social Sciences in Policy Making in the United States (editor). Paris: OECD, 1980
- Dualism and Discontinuity in Industrial Societies (with Michael Piore). New York: Cambridge University Press, 1980
  - Italian version: Dualismo economico e politica nelle società industriali. Bologna: Il Mulino, 1982
- Organizing Interests in Western Europe (editor, with introductory chapter and one other chapter). New York: Cambridge University Press, 1981
  - Italian version: L’organizzazione degli interessi nell’Europa occidentale. Bologna: Il Mulino, 1983
  - Spanish version: La organización de los grupos de interés en Europa Occidental. Madrid: Ministerio de Trabajo y Seguiridad Social, 1988
- Religion and Politics in Western Europe (editor). London: Frank Cass, 1982
- Made in America: Regaining the Productive Edge, (coauthor). Cambridge, MA, MIT Press, 1989
- National Diversity and Global Capitalism (editor, with Ronald Dore). Ithaca: Cornell University Press, 1996
  - Italian version with new introduction: Differenze nazionali e capitalismo globale (Bologna: Il Mulino, 1998)
- Made by Hong Kong (with Richard K. Lester), Hong Kong: Oxford University Press, 1997
- Notre Première Mondialisation: Leçons d’un échec oublié, Paris: Seuil, 2003, ISBN 2-02-057921-9
- Global Taiwan (editor, with Richard K. Lester), M.E. Sharpe, 2005
- How We Compete: What Companies Around the World Are Doing to Make It in the Global Economy. New York: Doubleday, 2005
  - French version with new foreword: Made in Monde (Paris, Seuil, 2006), ISBN 2-02-085296-9
