= Kathryn Huff =

American researcher and government official

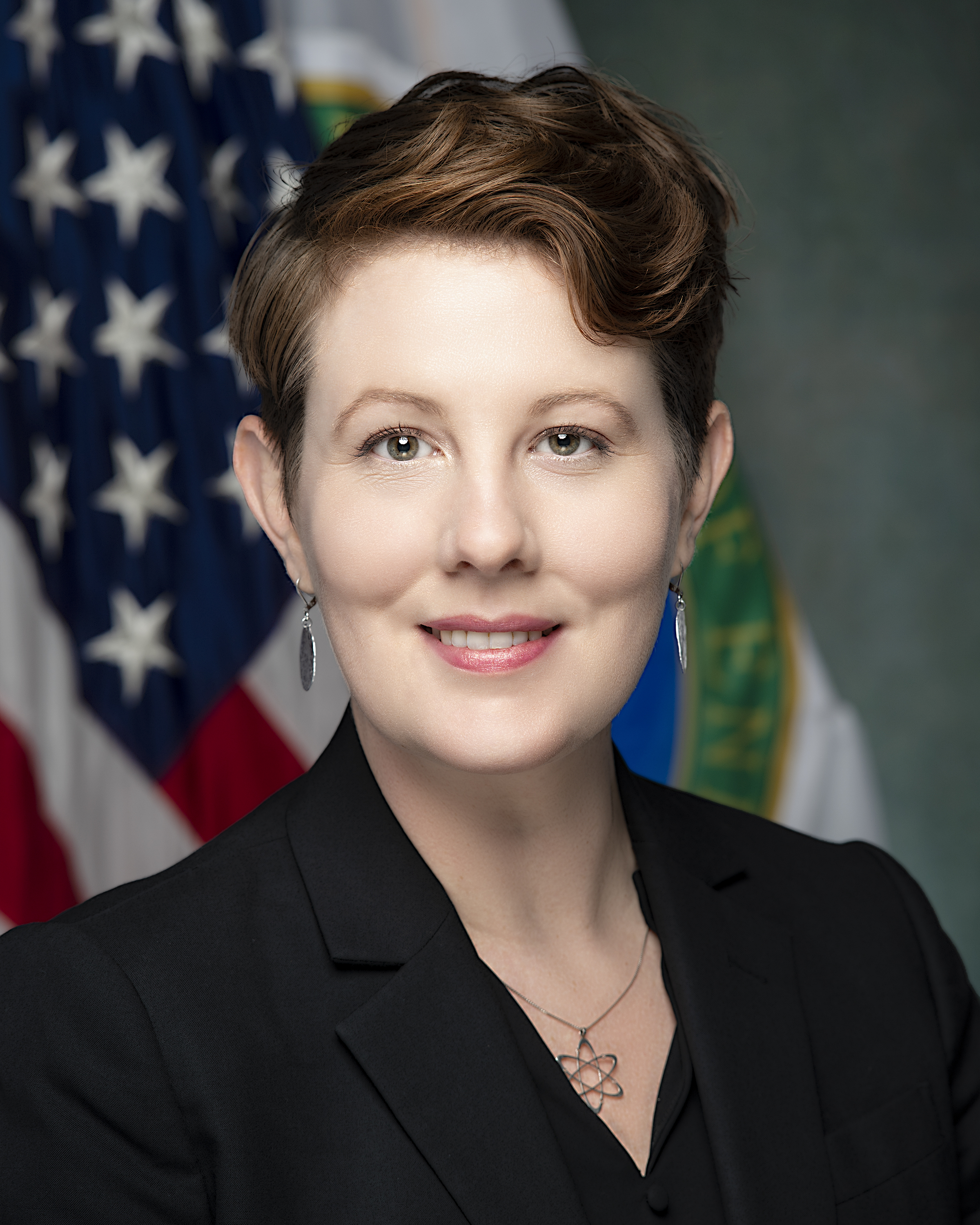

Assistant Secretary of Energy for Nuclear Energy
- In office May 11, 2022 – May 3, 2024
- President: Joe Biden
- Preceded by: Rita Baranwal
- Succeeded by: Theodore J. Garrish

Personal details
- Education: University of Chicago (BA); University of Wisconsin–Madison (PhD)

Kathryn D. Huff is an American engineer who served as the assistant secretary for the Office of Nuclear Energy from 2022 to 2024. She is the chair of the Department of Nuclear Engineering and Engineering Physics at the University of Wisconsin-Madison and an associate professor at the University of Illinois Urbana–Champaign.

== Early life and education ==
Huff attended high school in Bellville, Texas before graduating from the Texas Academy of Mathematics and Science. During high school, she also took mathematics and science courses at the University of North Texas. She earned a Bachelor of Arts degree in physics from the University of Chicago and a PhD in nuclear engineering from the University of Wisconsin–Madison. Huff has a twin sister.

== Career ==
In 2003 and 2004, Huff worked as a research assistant at the Los Alamos National Laboratory. She also worked as a research assistant at the University of Chile and Kavli Institute for Cosmology.

In 2008, she became a member of the American Nuclear Society (ANS), and still remains one today. She has held many leadership positions in the ANS, including the Fuel Cycle and Waste Management Division, the Nuclear Nonproliferation Policy Division, the Mathematics and Computation Division, and the Young Members Group.

In 2010, she was an intern at the Idaho National Laboratory, specializing in advanced nuclear energy systems integration. From 2011 to 2013, Huff was a graduate researcher at Argonne National Laboratory. After finishing her PhD, she was Postdoctoral Fellow at the Berkeley Institute for Data Science and the Nuclear Science and Security Consortium. In August 2016, Huff began an assistant professorship in the Department of Nuclear, Plasma, and Radiological Engineering at the University of Illinois Urbana–Champaign.

In her life, Huff has received two awards for her achievements. In 2016, she received the ANS Young Member Excellence Award, and in 2017, she received the Mary Jane Oestmann Professional Women’s Achievement Award.

In May 2021, Huff was selected to serve as Principal Deputy Assistant Secretary and Acting Assistant Secretary for the Office of Nuclear Energy. In January 2022, Huff was nominated to serve as Assistant Secretary for Nuclear Energy, for the Department of Energy. She was confirmed by the U.S. Senate on May 5, 2022, by an 80–11 vote and sworn in on May 11, 2022. She resigned on May 3, 2024, returning to the University of Illinois Urbana–Champaign as an associate professor. Huff timed her return to the University to align with the departure of her former colleague, research scientist Madicken Munk.

In 2025, Huff appeared on astrophysicist Neil deGrasse Tyson's Startalk show to discuss the future of nuclear energy and how to improve public understanding of nuclear safety. In 2026, she was announced as the chair of the Department of Nuclear Engineering and Engineering Physics at the University of Wisconsin-Madison, succeeding her PhD advisor Paul Wilson.
