= Alan Waltar =

Nuclear engineer and professor

Alan E. Waltar Ph.D.
- Born: July 10, 1939 (age 87); Chehalis, United States
- Education: Centralia College; University of Washington; Massachusetts Institute of Technology; University of California, Berkeley
- Known for: FFTF, nuclear safety, public advocacy of nuclear technology
- Awards: ANS Fellow (1984); Landis Public Communication and Education Award (2004); ANS Presidential Citation (2008); Washington State Academy of Sciences Fellow (2011)
- Scientific career
- Fields: Nuclear engineering
- Workplaces: Hanford Site; American Nuclear Society
- Doctoral advisors: Lawrence Ruby

Alan E. Waltar (born July 10, 1939) is a nuclear engineer and professor of nuclear engineering, known for his work on fast nuclear reactors and reactor safety. He played a role in the development of the Fast Flux Test Facility at the Hanford Site, served as a professor and head of the nuclear engineering department at Texas A&M University and was a president of the American Nuclear Society.

Waltar has been a public advocate for nuclear energy, authoring books about the benefits of nuclear energy for society and working to improve nuclear safety standards.

== Early life and education ==
Waltar was born in Chehalis, Washington, to parents of Finnish origin. He grew up in a rural area, working on a family farm and attending high school in Adna, Washington. After graduating from high school he studied pre-engineering at Centralia College on a Kiwanis scholarship. He then transferred to the University of Washington, where he majored in electrical engineering and graduated Magna Cum Laude.

Upon graduation, he received a United States Atomic Energy Commission fellowship to attend the Massachusetts Institute of Technology, where he received a masters degree in nuclear engineering in 1962. His thesis at MIT was supervised by Norman Rasmussen. He was then sponsored by the Atomic Energy Commission and the National Science Foundation to attend the University of California, Berkeley, where he studied nuclear engineering, automatic control systems, and mathematics under Prof. Lawrence Ruby, receiving a PhD in 1966.

== Career ==
Waltar got his first experience in the nuclear industry working a summer job on the N-Reactor at the Hanford Site in 1961. His first full time role was also at Hanford, where he took a position in 1966 working at the Fast Flux Test Facility. He worked on the project from its inception, and in subsequent regulatory approval of fast neutron reactors.

During this time, he began to work on fast neutron reactor safety. He also worked on advanced nuclear fuels and core design and artificial intelligence.

In 1976, Waltar took a sabbatical to teach for a year as a visiting professor at the University of Virginia. This experience eventually lead him to co-author his first book, a textbook titled Fast Breeder Reactors, with funding from the US Department of Energy. Waltar later served as head of nuclear engineering at Hanford, where he supervised clean up efforts.

Waltar was a professor and head of the nuclear engineering department at Texas A&M University from 1994-98. In 1998, he became a senior advisor and head of nuclear energy at the Pacific Northwest National Laboratory. Waltar co-founded the World Nuclear University Summer Institute in 2005. He also worked as a consultant for the IAEA, US Department of Energy, US Air Force Scientific Advisory Council, and is a member and senior advisor to the US Nuclear Energy Foundation.

=== American Nuclear Society ===
Waltar served on the American Nuclear Society as chair of the Eastern Washington section, the Nuclear Reactor Safety section, the Bylaws and Rules committee, the Finance committee, and finally as president from 1994-95. Waltar was made a fellow of the ANS in 1984.

== Research ==
Waltar is known for his work on fast breeder reactors, much of which was based on his experience at FFTF. The book that he co-authored on fast breeder reactors is used as a reference text in the field, with translations in Russian and Japanese. Topics covered include nuclear design methods, cross sections, kinetics and reactivity control, fuel management, thermal hydraulics transmutation physics, and safety considerations.

He authored a number of papers on fast reactor design, with a focus on safety features in particular. In his later life, he authored a number of papers arguing that public fears of low-level radiation are exaggerated and detrimental to the public interest.

== Awards and honors ==
- 1984 Fellow of the American Nuclear Society
- 2004 Landis Public Communication and Education Award
- 2008 Presidential Citation of the American Nuclear Society
- 2011 Fellow of the Washington State Academy of Sciences

== Selected publications ==
- MELT-I: A Simplified Meltdown Code for Fast Reactor Safety Analysis, technical report, 1968
- Fast Breeder Reactors, with Albert B. Reynolds, Pergamon Press, 1981
- America the Powerless: Facing Our Nuclear Energy Dilemma, Cogito Books, 1995
- Radiation and Modern Life: Fulfilling Marie Curie's Dream, Prometheus, 2004

== Views ==
Waltar has argued that advanced economies should use nuclear energy as a means of lowering prices of fossil fuels to facilitate economic development in the global south. He has also worked on a voluntary basis on applications of nuclear technology in supporting the development of sustainable agriculture in low-income countries such as Tanzania.

He has also advocated for the American Nuclear Society to adopt standards for nuclear waste clean up, saying:

"The nuclear discipline created these wastes, and the nuclear discipline is needed to clean it up."

== Personal life ==
Waltar married his childhood friend and neighbor Anna Geiszler in 1961. They had 4 children; Steve, Doug, Karen, and Bruce. Waltar has been active as a singer in the Richland Light Opera Company.
