= Warren F. Miller Jr. =

American engineering scientist (born 1943)

Warren F. "Pete" Miller Jr.
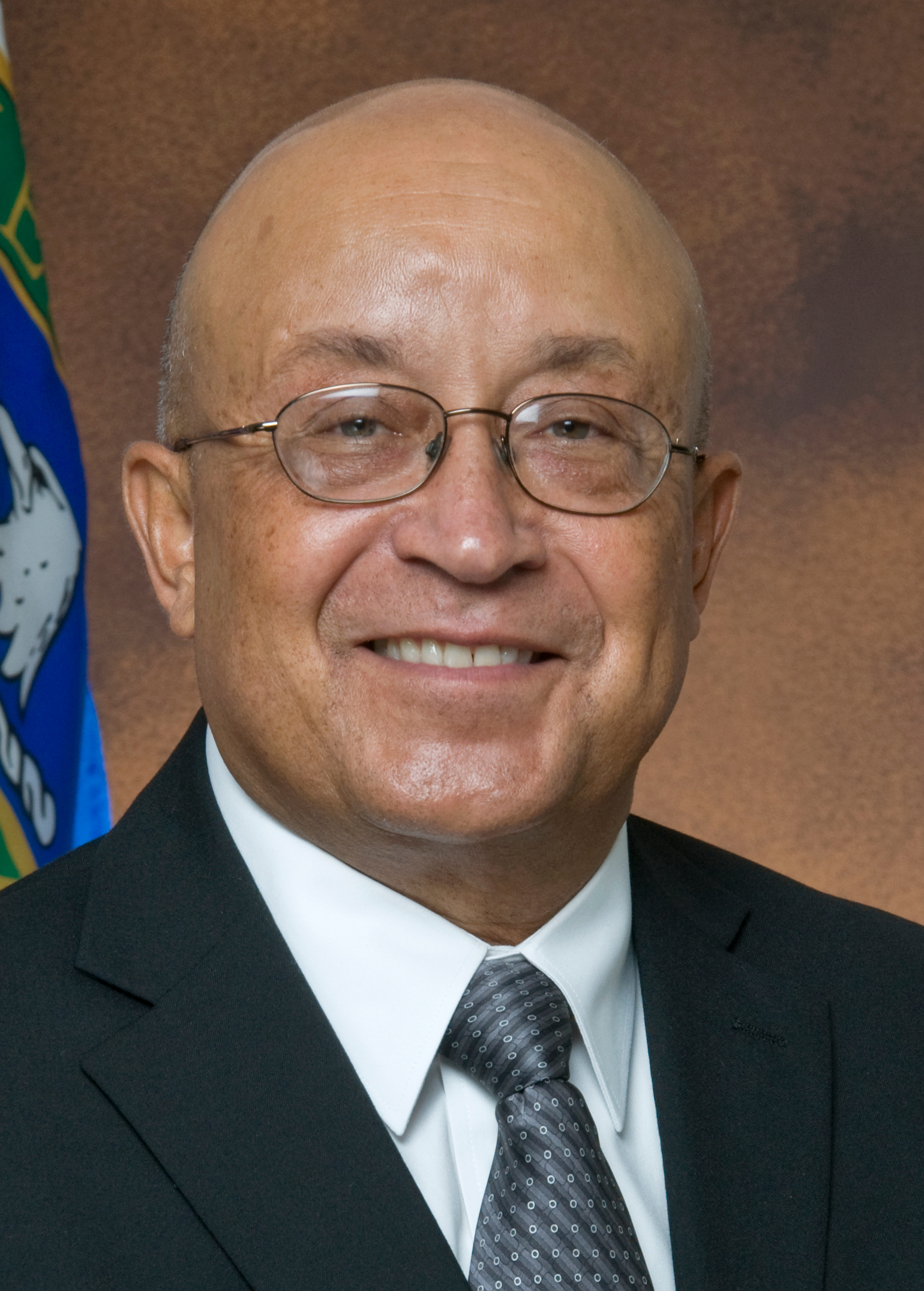

Former Assistant Secretary of Energy for Nuclear Energy
- President: Barack Obama
- Preceded by: Dennis Spurgeon
- Succeeded by: Peter B. Lyons

Personal details
- Born: March 17, 1943 (age 83) Chicago, Illinois, U.S.
- Education: United States Military Academy (BS); Northwestern University (MS, PhD)

Military service
- Allegiance: United States of America
- Branch/service: United States Army
- Rank: Captain
- Battles/wars: Vietnam War
- Awards: Bronze Star

Warren Fletcher "Pete" Miller Jr. (born March 17, 1943) is an American nuclear engineer known for his work in the areas of computational physics, radioactive waste management, transport theory, nuclear reactor design and analysis, and the management of nuclear research and development programs.

Miller served as the Assistant Secretary of Energy for Nuclear Energy under Secretary of Energy Steven Chu and President Barack Obama from 2009 to 2010. As Assistant Secretary, Miller was responsible for all programs and activities of the Office of Nuclear Energy.

Prior to 2009, Miller held senior administration positions at Los Alamos National Laboratory (1974-2001), as well as appointments at University of New Mexico, University of Michigan, Howard University, University of California, Berkeley, and Northwestern.

== Education and early life ==
Miller was born in Chicago, Illinois to Warren F. Miller, Sr., a milkman, and Helen Robinson Miller, a secretary for the University of Chicago. He attended school in the Englewood community on the city's South Side, where he excelled academically as well as in ROTC. In 1955, during the summer after his fifth-grade school year, one of Miller's classmates, 14-year-old Emmett Till, was murdered by two white men while visiting his mother's relatives in Mississippi. Till's murder impacted Miller on a deeply personal level.

Miller went on to attend the United States Military Academy at West Point, New York, during a period in which very few African Americans were admitted to the institution. After his graduation in 1964 with a Bachelor of Science in engineering sciences, Miller received additional training at the Army's Airborne School and Ranger School, followed by an appointment as an air defense artillery unit commander in the Greater Los Angeles area. Miller went on to attend the Army's supply school, and at the conclusion of his training, Miller—then a captain—completed a 13-month tour in the Vietnam War, where he was awarded the Bronze Star for meritorious service in a combat zone. After Vietnam, Miller returned to California, where he continued his military service as a logistics officer at the Army's Presidio base in San Francisco.

After leaving the Army in 1969, Miller was admitted to Northwestern University, where he earned both his master's and doctoral degrees in engineering sciences; subsequently, he remained at Northwestern for a brief period as an assistant professor in the engineering sciences department.

== Career and research ==
=== Los Alamos National Laboratory ===
In 1974, Miller joined the Los Alamos National Laboratory (LANL), a United States Department of Energy national laboratory, where he spent the next 27 years of his career.

During his tenure at LANL, Miller held a variety of research and leadership positions including deputy associate director for nuclear programs, associate laboratory director for energy programs, and deputy laboratory director for science and technology. Promoting diversity in the workplace was a key issue for Miller while at Los Alamos as well; in his capacity as Diversity Director, he encouraged the laboratory to recruit more minority scientists and acted as a mentor to other employees of color. Miller retired from LANL in 2001.

Concurrent with his career at LANL, Miller held appointments at several universities, including the University of California, Berkeley and the University of Michigan, and served on numerous national committees including the Department of Energy's Nuclear Energy Research Advisory Committee, the National Research Council's (NRC) Division of Earth and Life Sciences, the NRC's Nuclear and Radiation Studies Board, and the NRC's Committee on Long-Term Environmental Quality Research and Development.

=== Assistant Secretary of Energy ===
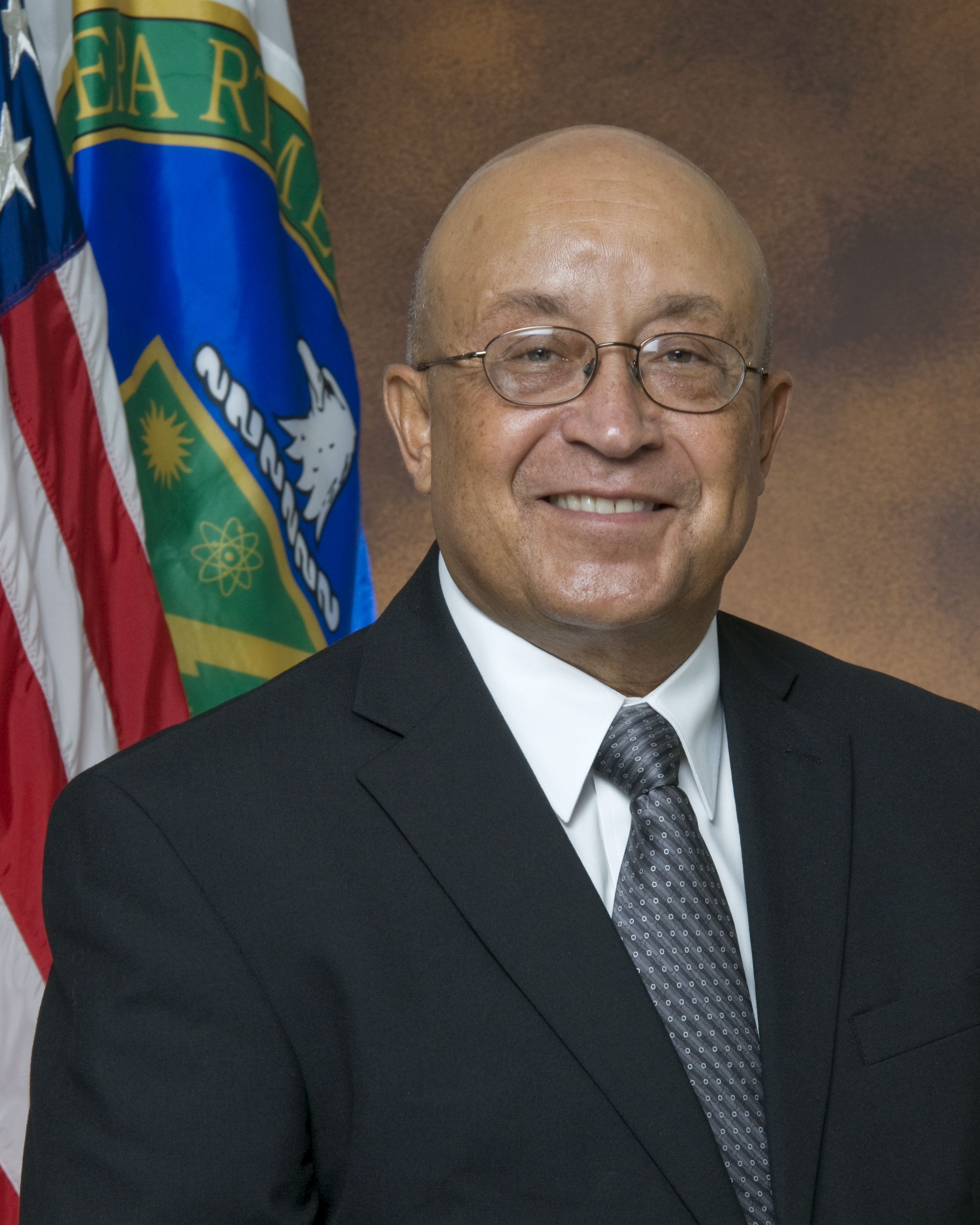
Official portrait as Assistant Secretary

In 2009, Miller was nominated by President Barack Obama to serve as the Assistant Secretary of Energy for Nuclear Energy under Secretary of Energy Steven Chu. During his Senate confirmation hearing, Miller remarked that nuclear power must play a key role in the country's energy strategy.

During his tenure as Assistant Secretary, Miller oversaw the negotiation of—and Presidential approval of—the Nuclear Reactor Loan Guarantee program in 2010, easing the way to raise private capital for new nuclear reactors. Miller also worked toward the creation of the Small Modular Reactor program, the establishment of the Nuclear Energy University Program, and the redirection of the country's research, development and demonstration plan for the disposal of high-level nuclear waste.

=== Current work ===
Since stepping down from the Assistant Secretary position in 2010, Miller has continued to focus on nuclear energy policy, reactor design and analysis, and radioactive waste management in a variety of leadership positions, including as the associate director of the Nuclear Security Science and Policy Institute at Texas A&M University, as an affiliate of the Center for International Security and Cooperation at Stanford University, as the co-chair of the Bipartisan Policy Center Nuclear Initiative alongside former Senator Pete Domenici, and (until 2016) as a member of the Nuclear Energy Advisory Committee (NEAC). From 2012 to 2016, Miller served as a "Distinguished TEES Professor" in the Texas A&M University System. From 2015-2026, Miller served as a Professor of Practice in the Department of Nuclear Engineering at Texas A&M University. He is presently affiliated with Kairos Power.

== Honors, memberships and awards ==
Warren F. Miller is an American Nuclear Society Fellow and was elected by his peers to membership in the National Academy of Engineering. He was honored as a State of New Mexico Eminent Scholar in 1989, received the Northwestern University Merit Award in 1993, and was awarded the Golden Torch Award for Distinguished Engineers by the National Society of Black Engineers in 2004. In recognition of his distinguished military service, Miller received both the Bronze Star in 1968 and the US Army Commendation Medal in 1969.

== Select publications ==
Lewis, E., & Miller, W. (1993). Computational Methods of Neutron Transport. American Nuclear Society. ISBN 0-89448-452-4.

== See also ==
- United States Department of Energy
- Neutron transport theory
- Energy policy of the United States
