= Nikolai Steinberg =

Ukrainian nuclear engineer

Nikolai Steinberg (or Shteynberg, born 1946 or 1947) is a Ukrainian nuclear engineer who was briefly chief engineer of the Chernobyl nuclear power plant after the Chernobyl disaster of 1986. He later served as chairman of a USSR commission tasked with investigating the causes of the disaster, served in various political roles and wrote two books about the disaster.

== Life ==
Steinberg came from a Jewish family in Odesa and obtained a degree in hydraulic physics from the Moscow Institute of Electrical Engineering. He started to work in Chernobyl in 1971, helping with the construction of the plant. The first reactor started operation in 1977. Steinberg rose to become chief of the turbine, and later left to work at the Balakovo Nuclear Power Plant. Steinberg returned to Chernobyl immediately after the disaster of 1986 and helped with the containment. He served as chief engineer of the Chernobyl plant from May 1986 to March 1987, responsible for restarting operation of the reactor blocks 1 and 2.

In 1991, the USSR State Committee for the Supervision of Safety in Industry and Nuclear Power created a commission to investigate the causes and conditions leading to the Chernobyl disaster. Steinberg served as chairman of the commission. The commission's report, published as an annex to the International Nuclear Agency's 1992 report on the accident, faulted design deficiencies of the reactor, inadequate safety engineering, operator mistakes, and the lack of a legal basis for the Soviet nuclear programme. Steinberg related the origins of the report in an interview in 2023.

In 1994, Steinberg was chairman of the Ukrainian State Committee for Nuclear and Radiation safety. In 2006 he was Ukraine's deputy minister for nuclear energy.

In 2022, shortly after Russian forces had attacked the Chernobyl and Zaporizhzhia nuclear power plants, Steinberg wrote an angry letter to the editor of the Ukrainian Post, criticizing the lack of a forceful international response.

Together with Georgiy Kopchinsky, Steinberg wrote the 2019 book Chernobyl: Past, Present and Future. He published another book about the disaster in Ukrainian in 2026.
