= Gail Marcus =

American nuclear engineer

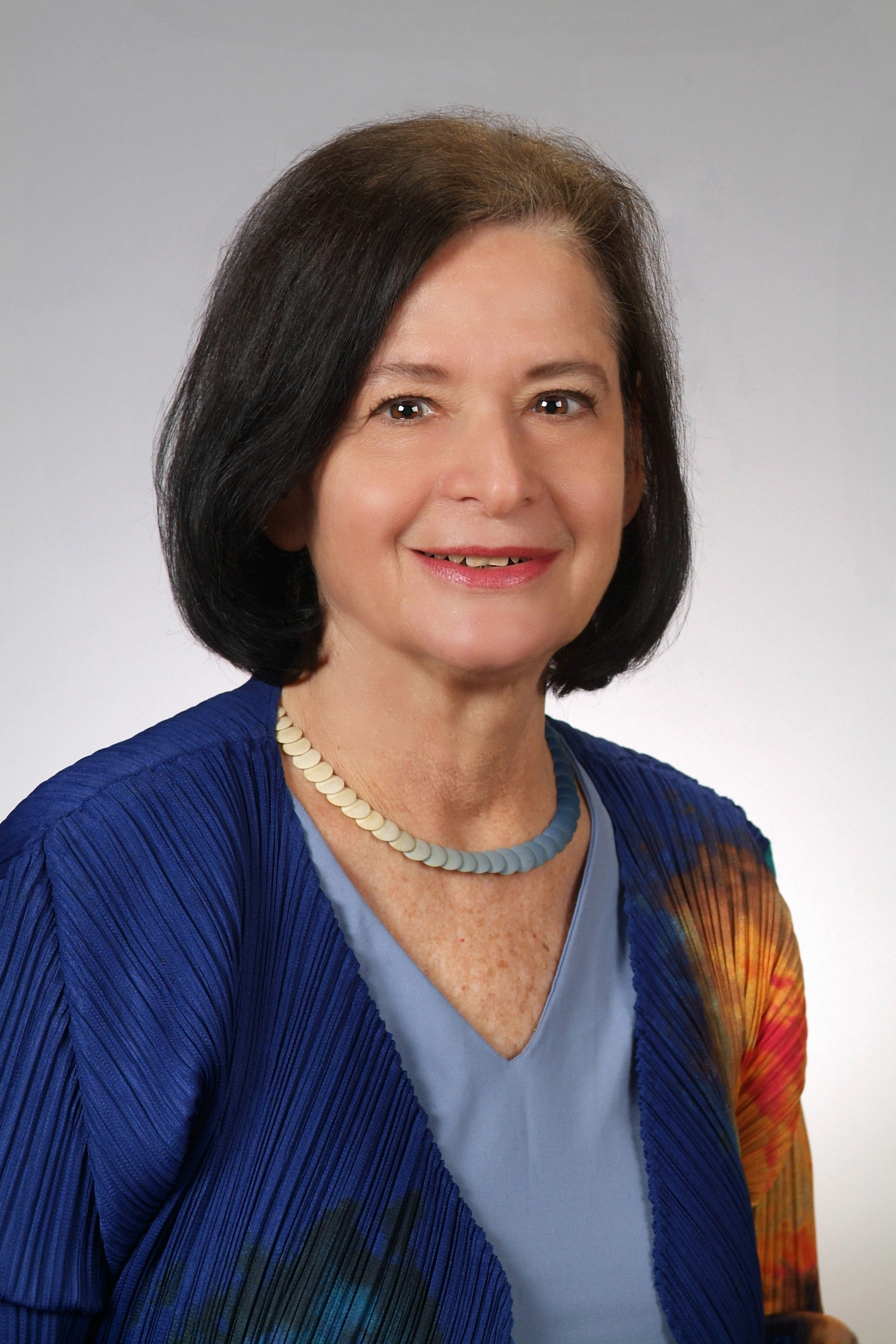
Marcus

Gail H. Marcus is an American nuclear engineer and expert on nuclear power plants, the first American woman with a doctorate in nuclear engineering. She is a past president of the American Nuclear Society, and the author of the book Nuclear Firsts: Milestones on the Road to Nuclear Power.

== Education and career ==
Marcus grew up in a Jewish family in Long Branch, New Jersey, the oldest of three children. Her mother was a schoolteacher and her father was an electrical engineer, both first-generation Americans. She was her public high school's valedictorian. Her father encouraged her to go to the Massachusetts Institute of Technology (MIT), where she earned bachelor's and master's degrees in physics in 1968. She completed a doctorate (Sc.D.) in nuclear engineering at MIT in 1971, becoming the first American woman to earn a nuclear engineering doctorate.

While still in her doctoral program, Marcus worked on the effects of atomic bomb blasts on military electronic equipment, for the United States Army in Fort Monmouth. After completing her doctorate and working as a defense contractor for eight years, she joined the Congressional Research Service, where from 1980 to 1985 she was Assistant Chief of the Science Policy Research Division. In 1985 she moved to the Nuclear Regulatory Commission, where she held a variety of positions, including one as a technical assistant to Commissioner Kenneth C. Rogers. Her tenure there also included two long assignments in Japan, working there in 1991-2 on the advanced boiling water reactor and then from 1998 to 1999 as a visiting professor at the Tokyo Institute of Technology.

From 1999 to 2004, she worked at the United States Department of Energy, as Principal Deputy Director of the Office of Nuclear Energy, Science and Technology. During this time, she was also president of the American Nuclear Society from 2001 to 2002. From 2004 to 2007 she worked in Paris for the OECD, where she was Deputy Director-General of the Nuclear Energy Agency. She continues to work as a consultant for the nuclear power industry.

== Book ==
Marcus is the author of Nuclear Firsts: Milestones on the Road to Nuclear Power, published in 2010 by the American Nuclear Society.

== Recognition ==
Marcus was elected as a Fellow of the American Association for the Advancement of Science (AAAS) in 1992. She chaired the AAAS Engineering Section from 2007 to 2008, and is also a Fellow of the American Nuclear Society.

She was the 2013 recipient of the Engineer–Historian Award of the American Society of Mechanical Engineers, "for the books and series of articles she wrote or edited concerning the history of the nuclear power technology, notably Nuclear Firsts: Milestones on the Road to Nuclear Power Development". In 2014 she became the inaugural recipient of the E. Gail de Planque Medal of the American Nuclear Society.
