= List of Nobel laureates who worked on the Manhattan Project =

Since 1901, the Nobel Prize has been awarded to a total of 965 individuals and 27 organizations as of 2023. It was awarded to 33 scientists who also worked on the Manhattan Project. Of these, 24 won the Prize in Physics, six won the Prize in Chemistry, one won the Peace Prize, and two won the Prize in Physiology or Medicine.

== Awarded Nobel Prize before working on the Manhattan Project ==
Year	Image	Laureate	Prize	Motivation	Manhattan Project	References
1922		Niels Bohr	Physics	"for his services in the investigation of the structure of atoms and of the radiation emanating from them"	Los Alamos Laboratory	
1925		James Franck	Physics	“for their discovery of the laws governing the impact of an electron upon an atom”	Metallurgical Laboratory	
1927		Arthur Compton	Physics	"for his discovery of the effect named after him"	Metallurgical Laboratory	
1932		James Chadwick	Physics	"for the discovery of the neutron"	British contribution to the Manhattan Project	
1934		Harold Urey	Chemistry	"for his discovery of heavy hydrogen"	SAM Laboratory	
1938		Enrico Fermi	Physics	"for his demonstrations of the existence of new radioactive elements produced by neutron irradiation, and for his related discovery of nuclear reactions brought about by slow neutrons"	Metallurgical Laboratory, Los Alamos Laboratory	
1939		Ernest Lawrence	Physics	"for the invention and development of the cyclotron and for results obtained with it, especially with regard to artificial radioactive elements"	Radiation Laboratory	

== Awarded Nobel Prize during the Manhattan Project ==
Year	Image	Laureate	Prize	Motivation	Manhattan Project	References
1944		Isidor Isaac Rabi	Physics	"for his resonance method for recording the magnetic properties of atomic nuclei"	Consultant	

== Awarded Nobel Prize after working on the Manhattan Project ==
Year	Image	Laureate	Prize	Motivation	Manhattan Project	References
1946		Hermann Joseph Muller	Physiology or Medicine	"for the discovery of the production of mutations by means of X-ray irradiation"	Civilian advisor	
1951		John Cockcroft	Physics	"for their pioneer work on the transmutation of atomic nuclei by artificially accelerated atomic particles"	Montreal Laboratory	
1951		Edwin M. McMillan	Chemistry	"for their discoveries in the chemistry of the transuranium elements"	Los Alamos Laboratory	
1951		Glenn Theodore Seaborg	Chemistry	"for their discoveries in the chemistry of the transuranium elements"	Metallurgical Laboratory	
1952		Felix Bloch	Physics	"for their development of new methods for nuclear magnetic precision measurements and discoveries in connection therewith"	Los Alamos Laboratory	
1959		Owen Chamberlain	Physics	"for their discovery of the antiproton"	Los Alamos Laboratory	
1959		Emilio Segrè	Physics	"for their discovery of the antiproton"	Los Alamos Laboratory	
1960		Willard F. Libby	Chemistry	"for his method to use carbon-14 for age determination in archaeology, geology, geophysics, and other branches of science"	SAM Laboratories	
1961		Melvin Calvin	Chemistry	"for his research on the carbon dioxide assimilation in plants"	Radiation Laboratory	
1962		Maurice Wilkins	Physiology or Medicine	"for their discoveries concerning the molecular structure of nucleic acids and its significance for information transfer in living material"	Radiation Laboratory	
1963		Maria Goeppert Mayer	Physics	"for their discoveries concerning nuclear shell structure"	SAM Laboratories, Los Alamos Laboratory	
1963		Eugene Wigner	Physics	"for his contributions to the theory of the atomic nucleus and the elementary particles, particularly through the discovery and application of fundamental symmetry principles"	Metallurgical Laboratory	
1965		Richard P. Feynman	Physics	"for their fundamental work in quantum electrodynamics, with deep-ploughing consequences for the physics of elementary particles"	Los Alamos Laboratory	
1967		Hans Bethe	Physics	"for his contributions to the theory of nuclear reactions, especially his discoveries concerning the energy production in stars"	Los Alamos Laboratory	
1968		Luis Alvarez	Physics	"for his decisive contributions to elementary particle physics, in particular the discovery of a large number of resonance states, made possible through his development of the technique of using hydrogen bubble chamber and data analysis"	Los Alamos Laboratory	
1973		Geoffrey Wilkinson	Chemistry	"for their pioneering work, performed independently, on the chemistry of the organometallic, so called sandwich compounds"	Montreal Laboratory	
1975		Aage Bohr	Physics	"for the discovery of the connection between collective motion and particle motion in atomic nuclei and the development of the theory of the structure of the atomic nucleus based on this connection"	Los Alamos Laboratory	
1975		James Rainwater	Physics	"for the discovery of the connection between collective motion and particle motion in atomic nuclei and the development of the theory of the structure of the atomic nucleus based on this connection"	Metallurgical Laboratory	
1977		John van Vleck	Physics	"for their fundamental theoretical investigations of the electronic structure of magnetic and disordered systems"	Consultant	
1980		Val Fitch	Physics	"for the discovery of violations of fundamental symmetry principles in the decay of neutral K-mesons"	Los Alamos Laboratory	
1983		William Alfred Fowler	Physics	"for his theoretical and experimental studies of the nuclear reactions of importance in the formation of the chemical elements in the universe"	Los Alamos Laboratory	
1989		Norman F. Ramsey	Physics	"for the invention of the separated oscillatory fields method and its use in the hydrogen maser and other atomic clocks"	Los Alamos Laboratory	
1995		Frederick Reines	Physics	"for the detection of the neutrino"	Los Alamos Laboratory	
1995		Joseph Rotblat	Peace	"for efforts to diminish the part played by nuclear arms in international affairs and, in the longer run, to eliminate such arms."	Los Alamos Laboratory	
2005		Roy Glauber	Physics	"for his contribution to the quantum theory of optical coherence."	Los Alamos Laboratory	
