= Richard K. Lester =

American nuclear engineer

- Born: January 3, 1954 (age 72); Leeds, England
- Education: MIT School of Engineering
- Engineering career
- Institutions: MIT School of Engineering

Richard K. Lester (born January 3, 1954, in Leeds, England) is an American nuclear engineer, educator, and author. He is the Japan Steel Industry Professor and vice provost at the Massachusetts Institute of Technology, where he oversees the international engagements of the institute. He previously served as head of the Department of Nuclear Science and Engineering at MIT and he is the founding director and faculty chair of the MIT Industrial Performance Center.

== Education ==
Lester received his undergraduate degree in chemical engineering from Imperial College London (1974). He was a high-school athlete and musician and was a member of the National Youth Orchestra of Great Britain (1969–72). While at Imperial he was awarded a Kennedy Scholarship to study at MIT (1974–76), where he received a doctorate in nuclear engineering (1979). From 1977 to 1978 he was a visiting research fellow in international relations at the Rockefeller Foundation. He has been a member of the MIT faculty since 1979.

== Nuclear power and waste management ==
First at the Rockefeller Foundation and later as a member of the MIT faculty, Lester developed a number of projects focusing on the management and international control of nuclear technology. During the mid-1980s he led a study of the role of innovative nuclear power technologies in restoring the economic viability and social acceptability of nuclear power in the United States and elsewhere.

He also made contributions to the field of nuclear waste management, introducing the nation's first graduate course on this subject, serving on the National Academy of Sciences’ Board on Radioactive Waste Management, and publishing (with co-author Mason Willrich), Radioactive Waste: Management and Regulation (Free Press, 1978). During this period he held the Atlantic Richfield Professorship in Energy Studies at MIT.

== Made in America: Regaining the Productive Edge ==
In 1986, as an associate professor of Nuclear Engineering, he was appointed executive director of the MIT Commission on Industrial Productivity, and led the research that culminated in the publication of Made in America: Regaining the Productive Edge (MIT Press, 1989.). An assessment of America's manufacturing performance and how to strengthen it, Made in America was widely influential in the U.S. and around the world, and for a while was the best-selling volume in the history of MIT Press.

Returning to the themes of Made in America, he later authored The Productive Edge: A New Strategy for Economic Growth (W.W. Norton, 1998), an analysis of America's industrial resurgence during the 1990s.

== MIT Industrial Performance Center ==
In 1992, Lester founded the MIT Industrial Performance Center (IPC), an interdisciplinary research center for the study of innovation, productivity, and competitiveness that brings together faculty and students from across MIT to explore questions such as: What is needed in order to prosper in a globalizing economy? What skills, what strategies, what technologies, and what new forms of organization are most likely to bring success in particular competitive situations? And how do technological changes now underway shape these options?

While heading the IPC, Lester published the following books:

- Made By Hong Kong (Oxford University Press, 1997), co-authored with Suzanne Berger.
- Making Technology Work: Case Studies in Energy and the Environment (Cambridge University Press, 2003), co-authored with John M. Deutch.
- Innovation – The Missing Dimension (Harvard University Press, 2004), co-authored with Michael J. Piore.
- Global Taiwan: Building Competitive Strengths in the New International Economy (M.E.Sharpe, 2005), co-edited with Suzanne Berger
- Unlocking Energy Innovation: How America Can Build a Low-Cost, Low-Carbon Energy System (MIT Press, 2012), co-authored with David Hart

During this period he was also co-author of two influential MIT reports, The Future of Nuclear Power (2003), and The Future of Coal (2007).

== Nuclear Science and Engineering ==
From 2009 to 2015 Lester served as head of the MIT Department of Nuclear Science and Engineering, leading the department through a period of rapid rebuilding, educational reform, and strategic renewal. Under his leadership, the department implemented its ‘Science-Systems-Society’ educational triad, which calls for the faculty to work with students to develop their knowledge and capabilities in each of these three intellectual domains. He also encouraged faculty, students, and outside investors to consider the opportunities for new business formation around innovative nuclear technologies, and several notable startups emerged from the department during this period.

== Global MIT ==
In 2015 Lester began serving as MIT's first Associate Provost for International Activities. In this role he led the development and implementation of a new MIT strategy for global engagement. His current responsibilities include overseeing processes to enable MIT to engage with the world effectively, with responsible management of risks, and in keeping with the values of the MIT community. He continues to conduct research on strategies for achieving decarbonization of the global energy system while providing adequate supplies of affordable energy to the world's population.

== Consultancy and trusteeship ==
Lester serves as an advisor or consultant to corporations, governments, and private foundations and non-profit groups, and lectures frequently to academic, business and general audiences around the world. He recently completed a term as chair of the National Academies’ Board on Science, Technology, and Economic Policy. He previously served as a trustee of the Kennedy Memorial Trust of the United Kingdom.
