= Norman Rasmussen =

American physicist (1927-2003)

Norman Carl Rasmussen
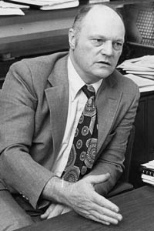
- Norman Rasmussen in 1980
- Born: November 12, 1927; Harrisburg, Pennsylvania
- Died: July 18, 2003 (aged 75)
- Education: Gettysburg College; MIT
- Awards: National Academy of Engineering (1977); National Academy of Sciences (1979); Enrico Fermi Award (1985)
- Scientific career
- Workplaces: Nuclear Engineering Department; MIT

Norman C. Rasmussen (November 12, 1927 – July 18, 2003) was an American physicist.

== Early life and education ==
Rasmussen was born in Harrisburg, Pennsylvania. He grew up on a dairy farm as the fifth of six brothers. He attended public school in Hershey, Pennsylvania. His father died when he was in eighth grade, and his family moved to Gettysburg, where his grandparents helped to care for the family.

Rasmussen graduated from high school in June 1945 and enlisted in the United States Navy. He was sent to Great Lakes Naval Training school, where he became an electronics technician. He served on active duty until August, 1946, when he was honorably discharged.

Norm enrolled in Gettysburg College in the fall of 1946, using the GI bill to finance his tuition. He majored in physics, and studied under Professor George Reich Miller, who encouraged Norm to go to graduate school. At Gettysburg he also met his future wife, Thalia Tichenor. They married in 1952.

== Career ==
He graduated from Gettysburg College cum laude in 1950 and enrolled as a graduate student in the physics department at MIT. He worked for Professor Robley Evans in the Radioactivity Center, which Evans had created and led. The work was concerned with the field of experimental low-energy nuclear physics, including the determination of nuclear energy levels, radiation dosimetry, and the biological effects of radiation. He worked as a teaching assistant for Professor Evans' two semester undergraduate course "Nuclear Physics" in 1952.

Rasmussen completed his Ph.D. in 1956 with the graduate thesis entitled "Standardization of Electron Capture Isotopes." After graduation, he remained in the physics department as an instructor. He also continued his experimental work at The Radioactivity Center. In the 1950s, the tools available for detection and measurement were relatively primitive. Norm was in the forefront of developing coincidence-counting techniques to measure decay schemes.

MIT began construction of their first research reactor, led by Norm's good friend Theos J. Thompson, to be competed in 1958. That same year, Course XXII was upgraded to a full MIT academic department (previously it was a program under Chemical Engineering), Norm as invited by Manson Benedict to be one of the new department's founding assistant professors. Rasmussen was a key user of the new reactor, and participated in constructing a 6-meter bent crystal spectrometer used for gamma ray spectroscopy studies for many years. He migrated from determination of decay spectra to the use of spectra for measuring nuclear composition. This led him to a major program for the measurement of spent nuclear fuel composition, a matter of significant importance to the nuclear weapons programs where both tritium and plutonium were created in production reactors. The International Atomic Energy Agency adopted his techniques for use in proliferation studies.

=== Research ===
His initial research concentrated on investigating radiation and gamma rays. He was the head of the nuclear engineering department from 1975 to 1981. He headed the landmark Reactor Safety Study (WASH-1400) in the early 1970s. This study established the formal discipline of Probabilistic Risk Assessment (PRA), and for this he is known as the father of PRA and Probabilistic Safety Assessment (PSA). Among his numerous honors was his election to both the National Academy of Engineering (1977) and the National Academy of Sciences (1979), as well as serving a 6-year term on the National Science Board during the Reagan Administration. Professor Rasmussen won the Enrico Fermi Award for excellence in the field of nuclear energy in 1985 for his ‘pioneering contributions to nuclear energy in the development of probabilistic risk assessment techniques that have provided new insights and led to new developments in nuclear power plant safety. Perhaps his most remembered moment was his televised debate with activist Ralph Nader over the safety of nuclear power.

== Personal life ==
Norm enjoyed sports and he was a fan of the Red Sox. His expertise in probability theory was reportedly reflected in his skill as a poker player.

== Technical reference ==
Norman Carl Rasmussen 1927-2003, Kent F. Hansen, Biographical Memoirs, volume 86, National Academy of Sciences (2005).
