= Advanced Fuel Cycle Initiative =

US Department of Energy research and development program

The Advanced Fuel Cycle Initiative (AFCI) is an extensive research and development effort of the United States Department of Energy (DOE). The mission and focus of AFCI is to enable safe, secure, economic and sustainable expansion of nuclear energy by conducting research, development, and demonstration focused on nuclear fuel recycling and waste management to meet U.S. needs.

The program was absorbed into the GNEP project, which was renamed IFNEC.

== Focus ==
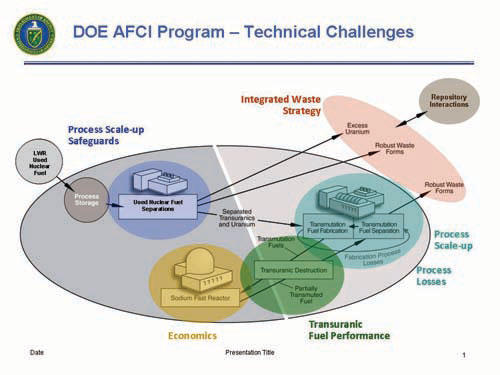
AFCI challenges

- Continue critical fuel cycle research, development and demonstration (RD&D) activities
- Pursue development of policy and regulatory framework to support fuel cycle closure
- Determine and develop RD&D infrastructure needed to mature technologies
- Establish advanced modeling and simulation program element
- Implement a science-based RD&D program

== Campaigns ==
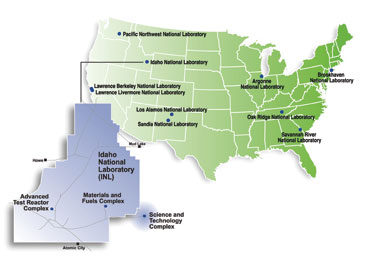
DOE national laboratories that support AFCI programs

The AFCI is an extensive RD&D effort to close the fuel cycle. The different areas within the AFCI are separated into campaigns. The RD&D of each campaign is completed by the United States Department of Energy's national laboratories.

- Transmutation fuels
- Fast reactor development
- Separations
- Waste forms
- Grid Appropriate Reactor Campaign
- Safeguards
- Systems analysis
- Modeling and simulation
- Safety and regulatory

=== Transmutation fuels ===
The mission of the Transmutation Fuels Campaign is the generation of data, methods and models for fast reactor transmutation fuels and targets qualification by performing RD&D activities on fuel fabrication and performance. The campaign is led by Idaho National Laboratory.

=== Reactor development ===
The mission of the Reactor Campaign is to develop advanced recycling reactor technologies required for commercial deployment in a closed nuclear fuel cycle. The Reactor Campaign is led at Argonne National Laboratory.

=== Separations ===
The mission of the Separations Campaign is to develop and demonstrate industrially deployable and economically feasible technologies for the recycling of used nuclear fuel to provide improved safety, security and optimized waste management. The campaign is led by Idaho National Laboratory. This entails alternatives to the de facto standard PUREX process, which is used by all countries that engage in large scale civilian nuclear reprocessing, but has been phased out for civilian uses in the US over nuclear proliferation concerns, with the US exerting diplomatic pressure to see it phased out globally.

=== Waste Forms Campaign ===
The mission of the Waste Forms Campaign is to develop and demonstrate durable waste forms and processes to enable safe and cost-effective waste management as an integral part of a closed nuclear fuel cycle by establishing a fundamental understanding of behavior through closely coupled theory, experiment and modeling. This campaign is led at Argonne National Laboratory.

=== Grid Appropriate Reactor Campaign ===
The mission of the Grid Appropriate Reactor Campaign is to enable U.S. leadership in the global expansion of nuclear energy by conducting research, development, and demonstration of technologies and innovative reactor designs that offer enhanced safety, security, and proliferation resistance and that are appropriately sized for infrastructure-limited countries.

=== Safeguards ===
The mission of the Safeguards Campaign is to ensure that domestic fuel cycle facilities fully meet requirements under regulatory frameworks; thereby assuring that nuclear materials have not been diverted or misused. The campaign is led at Sandia National Laboratories.

=== Systems analysis ===
The mission of the Systems Analysis Campaign is to conduct systems-wide analyses of nuclear energy development and infrastructure deployment to enable a requirements-driven process for all technical activities, and to inform strategic planning and key program decisions. The campaign is led at Idaho National Laboratory.

=== Modeling and simulation ===
The mission of the Modeling and Simulation Campaign is to rapidly create, and deploy “science-based” verified and validated modeling and simulation capabilities essential for the design, implementation, and operation of future nuclear energy systems with the goal of improving future U.S. energy security. These AFCI activities are led at Argonne National Laboratory.

=== Safety and regulatory ===
The mission of the Safety and Regulatory Campaign is to ensure that regulatory and licensing requirements for future facilities and technologies are appropriately considered and incorporated during the course of technology development.
