= Political positions of Lisa Murkowski =

Full coverage of the policies of a US senator

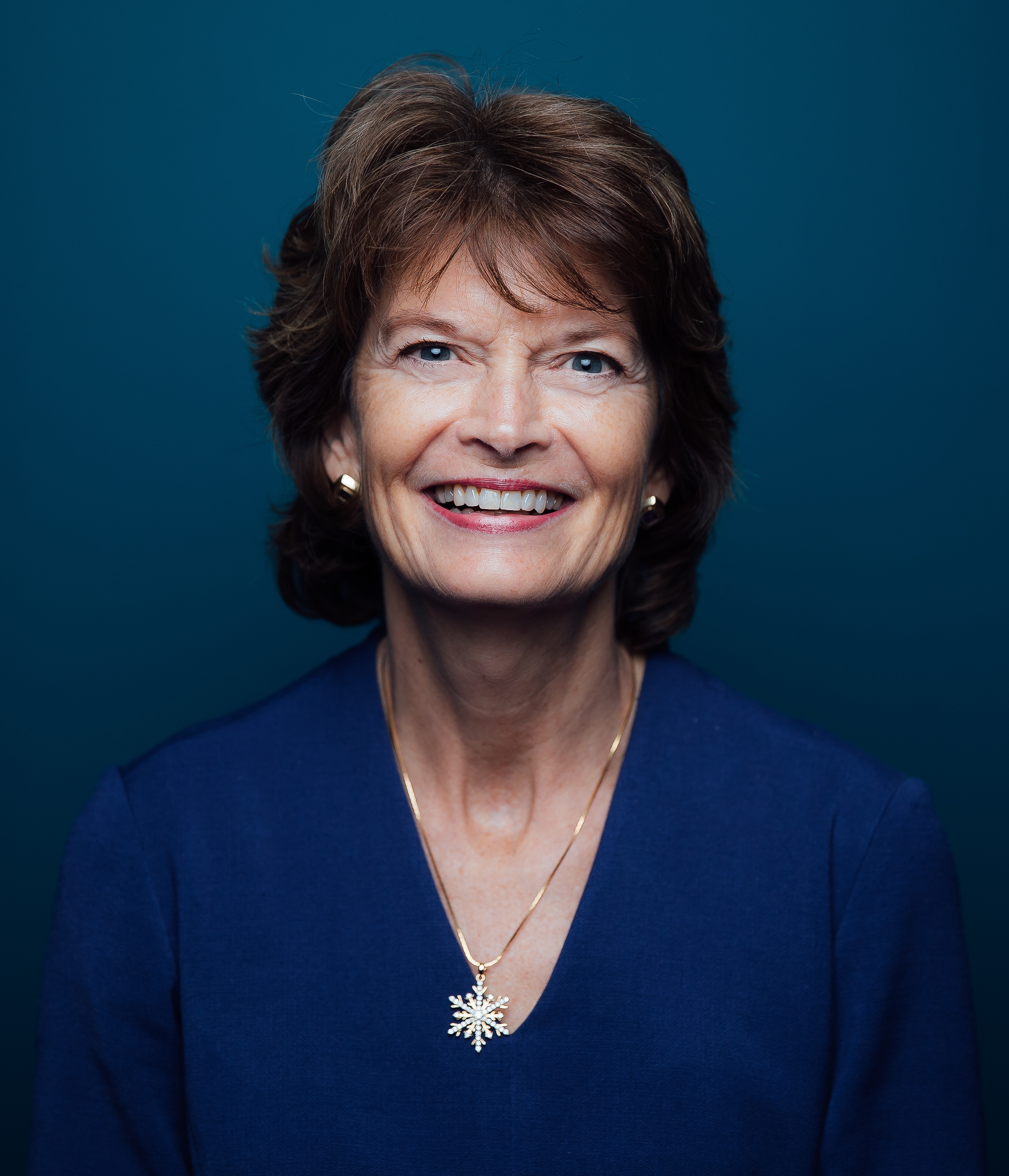
Murkowski during the 115th Congress

The political positions of Lisa Murkowski are reflected by her United States Senate voting record, public speeches, and interviews. Lisa Murkowski is a Republican senator from Alaska who has served since 2002.

Senator Murkowski is a moderate Republican. Since winning re-election in 2010, her voting record has been deemed by some as "more moderate" when compared to her previous years in the Senate. The National Journal, in 2013, gave Murkowski a composite score of 56% conservative and 45% liberal. The National Journal ranked her as the 56th most liberal and 44th most conservative member of the Senate. According to GovTrack, Murkowski is the second most liberal Republican Senator and, as of 2017, is placed by GovTrack's analysis to the left of all Republicans, except Susan Collins, and to the left of Democratic Senator Joe Manchin. The New York Times arranged Republican senators by ideology and also ranked Murkowski as the second most liberal Republican. In 2018, the fiscally conservative PAC Americans for Prosperity gave her a lifetime rating of 75% conservative and the ACU gave her a 52% conservative score in 2017. Americans for Democratic Action gave her a 2018 rating of 20% liberal. According to FiveThirtyEight, which tracks Congressional votes, Murkowski voted with President Trump's position approximately 73% of the time as of January 2021. As of October 2021, she has voted with President Biden's position nearly 79% of the time. According to CQ Roll Call, Murkowski voted with President Obama's position on votes 72.3% of the time in 2013, one of only two Republicans voting for his positions over 70% of the time.

== Domestic policy ==
=== Abortion views ===
Murkowski is pro-abortion rights or 'pro-choice,' supports non-federally funded embryonic stem cell research, and has voted to prohibit Partial Birth Abortion. She did not want to overturn the Roe v. Wade decision and by July 2018, Murkowski was one of three Republican senators, along with Susan Collins and Shelley Moore Capito, who had publicly supported keeping the Roe v. Wade decision. In 2025 she and Susan Collins were the only 2 republicans to join all democrats and independents in opposing an ultimately successful bill that ended federal funding for planned parenthood. Murkowski opposes defunding Planned Parenthood. In 2017, she was one of seven Republicans, including Capito and Collins, who voted against a bill to repeal the ACA without a replacement that also would have defunded Planned Parenthood. In 2018, Murkowski joined Collins, voting with a majority of Democrats, against a bill to ban abortion after 20 weeks of pregnancy. Murkowski was one of two Republicans who voted against an amendment to prohibit federal funding from being given to facilities that promote abortion services or family planning. In 2021, she was one of three Republican senators, the others being Capito and Collins, who declined to sign an amicus brief supporting an anti-abortion Mississippi law banning abortion after 15 weeks of pregnancy.

In 2019, Senator Murkowski announced support for the ratification of the Equal Rights Amendment. She has introduced legislation in Congress to remove the previous deadline for the ERA's ratification in order to allow it to continue to receive support from the necessary number of states. The ERA has been opposed by conservative groups, including major anti-abortion organizations, due to concerns that the ERA would provide additional protections for abortion rights. In May 2019, Murkowski opposed laws that would ban abortion without exception.

Murkowski opposed the June 2022 overturning of Roe v. Wade.

Planned Parenthood, which rates politicians' support for abortion rights issues, has given Murkowski a lifetime score of 65% as of 2019. NARAL Pro-Choice America, which also provides ratings, gave her a score of 42% in 2017. Conversely, National Right to Life, which opposes abortion and rates support for anti-abortion issues, gave Murkowski a score of 66% during the 114th Congress and a 0% in 2019.

=== Agriculture ===
In April 2014, Murkowski sent a letter to Secretary of Agriculture Tom Vilsack regarding a provision in the Agriculture Act of 2014 which would mandate retail stores accepting food stamps would have to stock "staple items in perishable form in three of the four following categories instead of two: dairy products; meat, poultry, or fish; fruits or vegetables; and bread or cereals." Murkowski wrote that this sometimes was not a plausible reality in bush Alaska, citing "the extreme weather conditions and transportation challenges" and asserted the inappropriateness of the Obama administration drafting rules "that prevented low-income Alaskans from participating in federal food assistance because the only local store within a hundred miles was kicked out of the program for not selling enough fresh fruit, milk, meat, and bread."

In 2018, Murkowski and Democratic senators Mazie Hirono and Brian Schatz worked to include an amendment in a bipartisan farm bill that provided at least $4 million in small grants for individuals, food banks, schools and other nonprofits for the purpose of promoting food security within Hawaiian communities. The bill set policy and funding levels for agriculture and nutrition programs for the following five years and was passed in the Senate on December 11, 2018 in a vote of 87 to 13.

In March 2019, Murkowski and 46 other senators sent a letter to the Department of Agriculture (USDA) asserting their opposition to a USDA proposal that would restrict waivers and thereby make receiving nutritional assistance through the Supplemental Nutrition Assistance Program more difficult for an estimated 2.8 million people, critiquing the rule as ignoring "the intent of Congress, would worsen hunger in this country, and would do nothing to help increase stable, long-term employment or move individuals to self-sufficiency."

=== Death penalty ===
As of 2010, Murkowski supports the death penalty for "certain crimes" such as first-degree murder and terrorism.

=== Summer meals ===
In June 2019, Murkowski and Democrat Kirsten Gillibrand announced the Summer Meals Act of 2019, legislation altering the Department of Agriculture's Summer Food Service Program to grant more children access to summer meals in addition to providing transportation for children in rural and hard-to-reach areas to aid their access of summer meals along with imposing flexibility to the program so children can have more than one meal. Murkowski stated that many children in Alaska and the United States rely on meals from school and attributed federal policies as the reason for difficulty in feeding hungry children.

=== Budget ===
In February 2015, after Senate leaders reached a compromise to lower the threshold for the number of votes needed to pass bills, Murkowski was one of 14 Republican senators to vote for legislation that extended a 2 percentage-point cut in the payroll tax for the remainder of the year and provided an extension of federal unemployment benefits along with preventing doctors' payments under Medicare from being cut.

In 2016, Murkowski was a cosponsor of the End Government Shutdowns Act, a bill by Rob Portman that would form an automatic continuing resolution (CR) for every appropriations bill for the purpose of the federal government never shutting down again. Funding for the continuing resolution would be reduced by 1 percent after the first 120 days, and by 1 percent every 90 days thereafter before Congress finished the annual appropriations process.

In January 2019, Senator Murkowski supported both Republican and Democratic bills to end a government shutdown. She was one of six Republicans who broke with their party to vote in favor of the Democratic proposal. In response to Commerce Secretary Wilbur Ross stating that he did not "understand why" workers had to go to food banks during the shutdown, Murkowski commented, "We saw yesterday the insensitivity of certain remarks a Cabinet secretary that demonstrated to me that he is just so clearly of out of touch, with men and women who get up every day and go do oftentimes pretty menial work at some of these jobs. I’m talking about the secretary of Commerce. And you know what he said was so disconnected from reality that it stunned me."

In April 2020, amid the COVID-19 pandemic, the Senate passed $484 billion in relief with most funding going to refill the coffers of the Paycheck Protection Program. Murkowski stated that lawmakers knew they would be underestimating certain areas when passing the Families First Act and CARES Act and that they were aware they "have directed a lot of federal resources and it will require us getting back to work in order to deal with this", citing "no good choices". In May 2020, Murkowski and fellow Alaska Senator Dan Sullivan introduced the Coronavirus Relief Fund Flexibility Act, a bill that would authorize municipalities to use federal CARES Act funding for lost revenue.

In August 2021, Murkowski was among 19 Republicans in the Senate who voted with the Democratic caucus to approve a bipartisan $1.2 trillion infrastructure bill. In October 2021, she was one of the 15 Republicans who voted for a temporary spending bill to avoid a government shutdown. That same month, she voted with 10 other Republicans to break the filibuster of legislation to raise the debt ceiling. However, she voted against the final bill to raise the debt ceiling.

=== Taxes ===
Murkowski is a signer of Americans for Tax Reform's Taxpayer Protection Pledge.

The National Federation of Independent country Business named Murkowski a Guardian of Small Business for her "outstanding" voting record on behalf of small business owners.

On December 2, 2017, Murkowski voted for the Tax Cuts and Jobs Act of 2017, citing her desire for job growth and tax reduction.

In December 2019, Murkowski and Democratic Senator Jeanne Shaheen introduced S. 2942, an amendment to the Internal Revenue Code of 1986 that would provide some contributions be treated as non-taxable contributions to capital in an effort to prevent taxation of Contributions in Aid of Construction (CIAC). National Association of Water Companies (NAWC) President and CEO Robert F. Powelson stated that the NAWC was "very grateful for the support and leadership of Senators Shaheen and Murkowski in pushing S. 2942 forward" and that the bill would "allow America’s water companies to continue to provide safe, reliable drinking water and wastewater services to customers at an affordable price by ensuring that the expansion of these services to new customers or new locations does not unfairly burden a utility’s existing customers.”

In May 2020, along with Mike Braun, John Hoeven, and Kelly Loeffler, Murkowski introduced the Safeguarding Small Business Act, legislation that would end all tax liability associated with loan forgiveness under the Paycheck Protection Program (PPP). Murkowski said lawmakers needed "to give our small businesses whatever help we can to make sure they are able to keep their workers employed and their doors open" and promoted the bill's passage as helping "ensure Alaska’s small business owners are protected under the PPP as intended, giving them much-needed support to overcome the impacts of this pandemic."

=== Criminal justice ===
On December 18, 2018, Murkowski was one of 12 senators to vote against the FIRST STEP Act, legislation aimed at reducing recidivism rates among federal prisoners through expanding job training and other programs in addition to forming an expansion of early-release programs and modifications on sentencing laws such as mandatory minimum sentences for nonviolent drug offenders, "to more equitably punish drug offenders." In a tweet before the vote, Murkowski charged the Senate with rushing through a package "that could reduce time that drug traffickers & other convicted felons spend in federal prison in the name of rehabilitation."

=== Affirmative action ===
Murkowski opposes affirmative action.

=== Alaska Native issues ===
Murkowski is an active member of the Senate Committee on Indian Affairs and served as Vice Chairman of the committee during the 110th Congress. She is the Chairman of the Senate Energy and Natural Resources Committee and a member of the Committee on Appropriations, and has a continuing role on the Health, Education, Labor and Pensions Committee. In 2009, she was honored with a Congressional Leadership Award by the National Congress of American Indians. She is the first Alaskan to receive the award.

In 2012, Murkowski submitted a biomass-related amendment for inclusion in the Tribal Energy Bill that contained a provision for tribes to be authorized to become involved with rural biomass energy demonstration projects, as Murkowski insisted that the bill did this only for tribes in the Contiguous United States and not Alaska. Murkowski called the bill without her amendment "another one of those laws and rules that don’t work in Alaska, where our people have hundreds of thousands of acres of timber lands and an enormous need for exactly these sorts of innovative solutions." The amendment was passed unanimously by the Senate Committee on Indian Affairs on September 13, 2012.

At the start of the 116th Congress, Murkowski and Democrat Catherine Cortez Masto revived Savanna's Act, a bill intended to improve the response of the federal government to the crisis of murdered and missing Native American women and girls. The bill passed in Senate with unanimous support during the previous Congress when it was sponsored by then-Senator Heidi Heitkamp, but was blocked from passing in the House by Chair of the House Judiciary Committee Bob Goodlatte. Of the bill, Murkowski said, "It got held up in the House literally over one member. That member’s gone and I’m still here."

In January 2020, Murkowski co-sponsored the INVEST Act, a bill that sought to improve the existing New Markets Tax Credit program to heighten its outreach to Native communities. Mazie Hirono, a fellow sponsor of the bill, said the bill would ensure "Native Hawaiian communities in our state and other Native communities across the country will benefit from new access to much-needed resources" and that she was "proud to join Senator Murkowski to introduce this legislation to support Native communities and build on the program’s success."

In April 2020, after Congress allocated $8 billion in funding for tribal governments as part of the CARES Act, Murkowski and Alaska Representative Don Young were among thirty-one lawmakers to sign a letter to President Trump requesting the funding be allocated quickly while also being distributed in a manner respectful to tribal sovereignty: "It is therefore incumbent upon these agencies to respect the inherent sovereignty of Indian Tribes and show deference to Tribal views, particularly as they relate to the use and distribution of CARES Act resources."

=== Hate crimes ===
After the 2017 Unite the Right rally, Murkowski was part of a bipartisan resolution that condemned white nationalists, white supremacists, the Ku Klux Klan, neo-Nazis and other hate groups, and called on the Trump Administration to use resources toward the improvement of data collection on hate crimes and to work together to address the growing prevalence of hate groups.

In February 2020, Murkowski and Democrat Amy Klobuchar introduced the Justice for Victims of Hate Crimes Act, intended to address the different interpretations of the motive requirement in the Matthew Shepard and James Byrd Jr. Hate Crimes Prevention Act. Murkowski stated that discrimination, violence, and stereotyping needed to be put to a stop and called the bill an "effort to empower federal law enforcement by providing the legal certainty they need to bring the perpetrators of hate crimes to justice."

=== Healthcare ===
In November 2003, Murkowski voted for a bill adding drug benefits to Medicare that included a provision granting doctors in Alaska roughly 50 percent more money to see Medicare patients. In a Senate floor speech, Murkowski said, "Seniors are not only being denied a choice of doctors, but in many cases they don’t have the ability to see a doctor at all. This is because doctors, or health care providers in Alaska are paid just about 37 cents on the dollar for the care they provide to seniors on Medicare."

Murkowski opposed President Barack Obama's health reform legislation; she voted against the Patient Protection and Affordable Care Act in December 2009, and she voted against the Health Care and Education Reconciliation Act of 2010. Murkowski has stated numerous times that she would like to repeal the Patient Protection and Affordable Care Act. Murkowski voted for H.R. 976, which called for the expansion of the State Children's Health Insurance Program (SCHIP) to provide coverage for additional uninsured children. That bill passed both the House and the Senate, but was vetoed by President George W. Bush. She supports health care reforms in her native state, as well, largely because health care costs for Alaskans are up to 70% higher than costs in the contiguous United States.

In 2016, Murkowski threatened a hold on the confirmation of Robert Califf as Commissioner of Food and Drugs due to the Obama administration's approving of genetically engineered fish.

In 2017, Lisa Murkowski announced that she was opposed to repealing the Affordable Care Act without a replacement plan. She voted against starting debates in the Senate. She also was one of seven Republicans who voted against repealing the ACA without a replacement. On July 27, 2017, Murkowski voted 'No' on the Health Care Freedom Act commonly referred to as the 'Skinny' repeal of the ACA. She said the defeated bill did not adequately replace the ACA, and that her constituents had expressed concerns about its impact on their health coverage. Murkowski called for "a more open process" in writing a replacement bill. Her vote was criticized by some Alaska Republicans, while 200 people rallied in Anchorage and marched to Murkowski's office to thank her for her role in protecting the ACA. In 2018, Murkowski voted with all other Republicans, except Susan Collins, against a resolution to repeal the "short-term health insurance plans" allowed by the Trump administration.

In 2018, Murkowski was the original cosponsor of the Senate version of the Improving Access to Maternity Care Act, an amendment to the Public Health Service Act that would mandate the Health Resources and Services Administration identify maternity care health professional target areas and thereafter assign more maternity care health professionals to those respective areas. The Senate passed the bill in December 2018.

In an August 2019 interview, Murkowski promoted the Lower Health Care Costs Act, legislation that reduced the overall cost of health care through provisions relating to price transparency and pharmaceuticals cost reduction. She stated that the Lower Health Care Costs Act would allow a negotiation between insurers and providers over the prices of out-of-network costs, which she opined was "a headache in the first place and it’s even worse when you’re not well", and noted her efforts toward "a provision that would force pharmaceutical manufacturers to justify rate increases on their medications above a certain amount."

In August 2019, Murkowski and Senator Marsha Blackburn introduced the Rural Health Innovation Act, a bill that would form a national telehealth program and authorize a five-year grant program for the purpose of forming growth of telemedicine programs into rural communities as well as mandating a new payment system to encourage the adoption of telemedicine.

In October 2019, Murkowski was one of 27 senators to sign a letter to Senate Majority Leader McConnell and Senate Minority Leader Schumer advocating for the passage of the Community Health Investment, Modernization, and Excellence (CHIME) Act, which was set to expire the following month. The senators warned that if the funding for the Community Health Center Fund (CHCF) was allowed to expire, it "would cause an estimated 2,400 site closures, 47,000 lost jobs, and threaten the health care of approximately 9 million Americans."

=== Housing ===
In 2017, Murkowski was a cosponsor of the Affordable Housing Credit Improvement Act, a bipartisan bill by Maria Cantwell and Orrin Hatch intended to expand and retool the Low Income Housing Tax Credit program for the purpose of forming or retaining roughly 1.3 million affordable homes over the course of a decade.

=== Same-sex marriage and LGBT issues ===
In 2004, Murkowski voted in favor of a federal constitutional amendment to define marriage to be between one man and one woman. She said that would also support an Alaska state law defining marriage as between a man and a woman and that each state should have the right to establish its definition of marriage. Murkowski voted for a federal constitutional amendment to ban same-sex marriage in 2006. According to her spokesman, she wanted to protect the definition of marriage as between a man and a woman that Alaskans added to their state constitution in 1998.

Murkowski was one of five Republican senators who voted with Democrats for the Matthew Shepard and James Byrd Jr. Hate Crimes Prevention Act.

Murkowski supported the repeal of don't ask, don't tell after consideration of the Department of Defense report. "Our military leaders have made a compelling case that they can successfully implement a repeal of 'don't ask, don't tell'," she said. "It is infinitely preferable for Congress to repeal the law, and allow the service chiefs to develop and execute a new policy, than to invite a court-ordered reversal of the law with no allowance for a military-directed implementation. I've heard from Alaskans across the state who believe it's time to end this discriminatory policy, and I agree with them." On December 18, 2010, Murkowski was one of eight Senate Republicans to vote in favor of the Don't Ask, Don't Tell Repeal Act of 2010, and one of only four who had voted for cloture.

On March 27, 2013, Murkowski had said that her opinion on same-sex marriage was "evolving". She said she noticed that the country's views on marriage were changing, noting conversations with her children and their friends as an example. She said the country had more important issues to focus on than same-sex marriage.

On June 19, 2013, Murkowski announced her support of same-sex marriage, citing the encouragement of family values and Alaskans' favor of limiting government's power. She became the third sitting Republican United States Senator to do so after Senators Rob Portman of Ohio and Mark Kirk of Illinois. In 2015, she was one of 11 Senate Republicans who voted to give social security benefits to same-sex couples in states where same-sex marriage was not yet recognized. The Human Rights Campaign, in its Congressional Scorecard rating support for LGBT issues during the 115th Congress gave Murkowski a 54% score, and during the 114th Congress, they gave Murkowski a score of 69%. During the 113th Congress, she received an 88% score. She received a 3% rating in the 116th Congress. She was endorsed by the Log Cabin Republicans, a PAC of LGBTQ Republicans.

In March 2021, Murkowski was the only GOP senator to vote against an amendment to the American Rescue Plan that would have stripped federal education funds from states, school districts and universities that allow transgender female athletes to participate in women's athletics at schools. Later in the month, she was one of two Republicans in the HELP Committee to vote in favor of advancing the nomination of Dr. Rachel Levine, a trans woman and physician, in a 13–9 vote. She was then one of two who voted to confirm Dr. Levine in a vote of the full Senate. In November 2021, Murkowski was one of two Republicans, the other being Susan Collins, who voted with the Democratic caucus in a 51–45 vote to confirm Pres. Joe Biden's nominee, Beth Robinson, to the US Court of Appeals for the Second Circuit; she is the first openly lesbian judge to be confirmed for the federal circuit courts. In 2022, she was one of 12 Republicans in the Senate voting to advance and pass the Respect for Marriage Act, legislation codifying same-sex marriage rights into federal law.

=== Education ===
In June 2014, along with Senators Bob Corker and Susan Collins, Murkowski was one of three Republicans to vote for the Bank on Students Emergency Loan Refinancing Act, a Democratic proposal authored by Elizabeth Warren that would authorize more than 25 million people to refinance their student loans into lower interest rates of less than 4 percent. The bill received 56 votes and was successfully blocked by Republicans.

In February 2017, Murkowski and Senator Susan Collins were the only two Republicans who voted in the Senate against Donald Trump's selection for Secretary of Education, Betsy DeVos. This caused a 50–50 tie broken by Senate president Mike Pence to successfully confirm DeVos' appointment. A day earlier, Collins and Murkowski both voted for DeVos within the Senate Health, Education, Labor and Pensions Committee, passing DeVos' nomination by a vote of 12–11 to allow the Senate to vote on DeVos.

In September 2017, Murkowski, Richard Burr, and Bob Casey introduced the Boost Saving for College Act, a bill intended to give low- and middle-income families access to tools with tax advantages to assist with paying for the high cost of higher education through authorizing contributions to college savings accounts to qualify for the Saver's Credit already applicable to retirement account contributions for household of lower and middle income.

In July 2019, Murkowski and Democrat Brian Schatz introduced the Building Indigenous STEM Professionals Act, a bill that would reauthorize and amend a grant meant to assist in the creation or expansion of programs which produce Native Alaskan and Native Hawaiian graduates in science, technology, engineering, and math fields (STEM). Murkowski stated that the ANSEP had aided in producing 800 graduates in the STEM field and that she was proud to introduce a bill that would "expand opportunities in STEM education for indigenous students across the country".

=== Labor ===
In November 2013, along with Republican Susan Collins and Democrats Joe Donnelly and Joe Manchin, Murkowski sent a letter to Senate Budget Committee Chairman Patty Murray and Ranking Member Jeff Sessions that called for the committee to address the Forty Hours is Full Time Act in its budget conference. The Forty Hours is Full Time Act was a bill that would define a full-time employee as one who works 40 hours per week in order to determine the employer mandate under the ACA. The senators wrote that they were "concerned that the PPACA definition of full time as an employee working just 30 hours a week is too low and out-of-step with standard employment practices in the U.S. today."

In January 2020, Murkowski and Democrats Cory Booker, Jeff Merkley, and Tammy Duckworth introduced the Providing Urgent Maternal Protections (PUMP) for Nursing Mothers Act. The bill provided salaried employees in a traditional office environment with break time and a private place for breastmilk pumping and included a provision granting women whose workplaces flout the law with methods to combat efforts to deny compensation or not enforce the law. Murkowski cited Alaska as having among the highest rates of breastfeeding in the US and stated that they "support mothers and their babies in one of the most critical stages of development when more access is available for working mothers."

=== Immigration ===
In 2007, Senator Murkowski voted against the McCain-Kennedy proposal to offer amnesty to undocumented immigrants. Later, Murkowski was one of two Republicans who voted for the DREAM Act in 2010. She was also one of fourteen Republicans in 2013 who voted for a comprehensive immigration bill that offered a pathway to citizenship for undocumented immigrants. In December 2016, Murkowski was one of five senators to serve as original cosponsors of the Bridge Act, a bill that would authorize at least 740,000 young immigrants who had received deportation reprieves and work permits under the Obama administration to keep those benefits for 3 additional years in the event that they are revoked. In 2018, Murkowski voted in favor of the McCain/Coons comprehensive immigration bill which did not include funding for a border wall as well as in favor of the bill proposed by Collins to grant a pathway to citizenship for 1.8 million Dreamers and to include $25 billion for border security; she voted against the Republican bill, backed by President Trump, which would have reduced and restricted legal immigration. After Trump announced a 'zero-tolerance' migration policy that separates children from parents Lisa Murkowski opposed the Trump administration's actions and called the policy "cruel, tragic". In 2019, Murkowski was among a group of senators introducing bipartisan legislation to oppose Trump's decision to use an emergency declaration to build a border wall. She was then one of a dozen Republicans who broke with their party, joining all Democrats, to vote for a resolution rejecting Trump's use of an emergency declaration. On September 25, 2019, she was again one of 11 Republicans who voted to overturn Trump's emergency declaration on the border.

=== Impeachment of President Trump ===
In 2019, she was one of three Republican senators, besides Susan Collins of Maine and Mitt Romney of Utah, who refused to sign a resolution opposing the impeachment inquiry into President Trump. On January 31, 2020, Murkowski released a statement prior to the impeachment vote indicating her intent to vote against calling witnesses. She said the two Articles of Impeachment were "rushed and flawed." She said she did not want to put Supreme Court Chief Justice John Roberts, who was overseeing the Senate's process, into the position of breaking a tie vote. The vote failed, 51–49, with Romney and Collins supporting the calling of additional witnesses and provision of new documents.

During the second impeachment of Donald Trump, and the subsequent trial in the Senate, Murkowski joined all Democrats and six Republicans in voting to convict the former president.

=== Net neutrality ===
Murkowski became one of only three Republicans to vote with the Democrats in favor of repealing rule changes enacted by the Republican-controlled FCC. The measure was meant to restore Obama-era net neutrality rules.

=== Gun rights ===
Murkowski has an A grade from the National Rifle Association of America for her support of gun rights. The organization endorsed her for her re-election bid for the Senate in 2016, which stated that she had a "proven record" of voting in favor of gun rights. Murkowski supports the right to bear arms, and was one of 46 senators to vote against expanding background checks to all gun show and internet sales in April 2013. She has voted in favor of concealed carry reciprocity law enabling Americans to carry their concealed gun in any state. She also voted against a partial ban of select firearms.

In November 2017, Murkowski was one of ten senators to cosponsor the Fix NICS Act, a bipartisan bill meant to ensure federal and state authorities comply with existing law and inform the national instant criminal background check system on relevant criminal history records.

In 2018, Murkowski was a cosponsor of the NICS Denial Notification Act, legislation developed in the aftermath of the Stoneman Douglas High School shooting that would require federal authorities to inform states within a day of a prohibited person attempting to buy a firearm failing the National Instant Criminal Background Check System.

Despite voting against marijuana legalization, Murkowski has called upon the federal government to review federal policy that forbids marijuana users, including those in legal states, from owning firearms.

=== Disaster relief ===
In February 2019, Murkowski was one of thirteen senators to sign a letter to congressional leaders insisting they bring "a disaster supplemental bill to the floor for consideration at the earliest opportunity to ensure that the federal government fulfills its responsibility” and warned that local and state governments would not have "necessary resources" to address multiple important issues without passage of a bill.

At a Senate Appropriations Subcommittee hearing on the 2020 budget for FEMA, Murkowski pressed Acting Administrator of the FEMA Pete Gaynor on the vagueness of the criteria for the home repair award, citing the appeal decisions as not being readily available and questioned Gaynor on how lawmakers could "know that disaster victims can have confidence in this program that is being administered".

=== Drugs ===
In May 2019, Murkowski was one of four senators to cosponsor the Fair Accountability and Innovative Research Drug Pricing Act, intended to implement a requirement that drugmakers notify the Department of Health and Human Services in addition to submitting a “transparency and justification" report at least 30 days prior to an increase of prices for drugs costing at least $100. Murkowski stated that the legislation would mandate drugmakers produce "a justification for each price increase, manufacturing, research and development costs for the qualifying drug, net profits attributable to the qualifying drug, marketing and advertising spending on the qualifying drug, and other information as deemed appropriate" and cited the need to change the "little to no transparency from pharmaceutical corporations" at a time of prescription costs rising.

=== Cannabis ===
Murkowski has cosponsored the bipartisan STATES Act proposed in the 115th Congress by Massachusetts Senator Elizabeth Warren and Colorado Senator Cory Gardner that would exempt individuals or corporations in compliance with state cannabis laws from federal enforcement of the Controlled Substances Act.

In March 2018, Murkowski and Democrat Jeff Merkley introduced the SAFE Banking Act, a measure within the Secure and Fair Enforcement Banking Act that Merkley had introduced the previous year that would prohibit federal officials from punishing banks simply "because the depository institution provides or has provided financial services to a cannabis-related legitimate business." Murkowski stated that the SAFE Banking Act was "intended to resolve" uncertainties about the state of the law when financial institutions bank marijuana-related businesses and that states which had made moves to legalize Marijuana "did so with the understanding that markets would be well-regulated and transparent."

=== Republican Party ===
In 2017, months into President Trump's term, Murkowski expressed concern that the Republican Party "might be becoming too exclusive and disjointed" and recalled the Ronald Reagan era as being when the GOP was more open and less right-leaning.

=== Oceans ===
In June 2019, Murkowski was one of eight senators to cosponsor the bipartisan Save Our Seas 2.0 Act, a bill unveiled by Dan Sullivan and Bob Menendez intended to spur innovation along with aiding in the reduction plastic waste's creation and both find ways to use already existing plastic waste to stop it from entering the oceans and address this problem on a global scale. The bill was meant to respond to the plastic pollution crisis threatening oceans, shorelines, marine life, and coastal economies and served as a continuation of the Save Our Seas Act.

=== Opioids ===
In October 2017, Murkowski and Democrat Elizabeth Warren wrote a letter to President Trump applauding his "stated commitment to addressing opioid addiction" and concurring with his position that the opioid crisis deserved an increase in federal spending. Warren and Murkowski expressed that they were "extremely concerned" that Trump had "yet to take the necessary steps to declare a national emergency on opioids, nor "made any proposals to significantly increase funding to combat the epidemic". The senators wrote that they hoped that Trump would pursue actions supporting his "verbal commitment to fighting the 'serious problem' of opioid addiction with action."

In December 2017, Murkowski was one of nine senators to sign a letter to Senate Majority Leader Mitch McConnell and Senate Minority Leader Chuck Schumer describing opioid use as a non-partisan issue presently "ravaging communities in every state and preys upon individuals and families regardless of party affiliation" and requesting the pair "make every effort to ensure that new, substantial and sustained funding for the opioid epidemic is included in any legislative package."

In January 2018, Murkowski, Claire McCaskill, and Dan Sullivan wrote a letter to acting Administrator of the Drug Enforcement Administration Robert Patterson calling on the DEA to issue a new regulation that would authorize certain health-care providers to obtain special registration letting them use telemedicine to prescribe medication for individuals with an opioid addiction.

In May 2018, Murkowski and Democrats Ed Markey and Maggie Hassan introduced legislation requiring federal agencies to form ways of measuring the effectiveness of efforts to address the opioid epidemic over the period of the next 180 days with the intent of "significantly reversing" misuse of opioids and opioid-related deaths within five years.

=== Privacy ===
In June 2019, Murkowski and Democrat Amy Klobuchar introduced the Protecting Personal Health Data Act, legislation mandating the United States Secretary of Health and Human Services create regulations for apps that track health data, wearable devices, and genetic testing kits in addition to forming a National Task Force on Health Data Protection that would evaluate and give a position on potential cybersecurity and privacy risks related to consumer products using customer health data. In a statement, Murkowski cited the need "to keep up with advancements in recent technology" and added that the bill prioritized American consumer privacy.

=== Supreme Court nominations ===
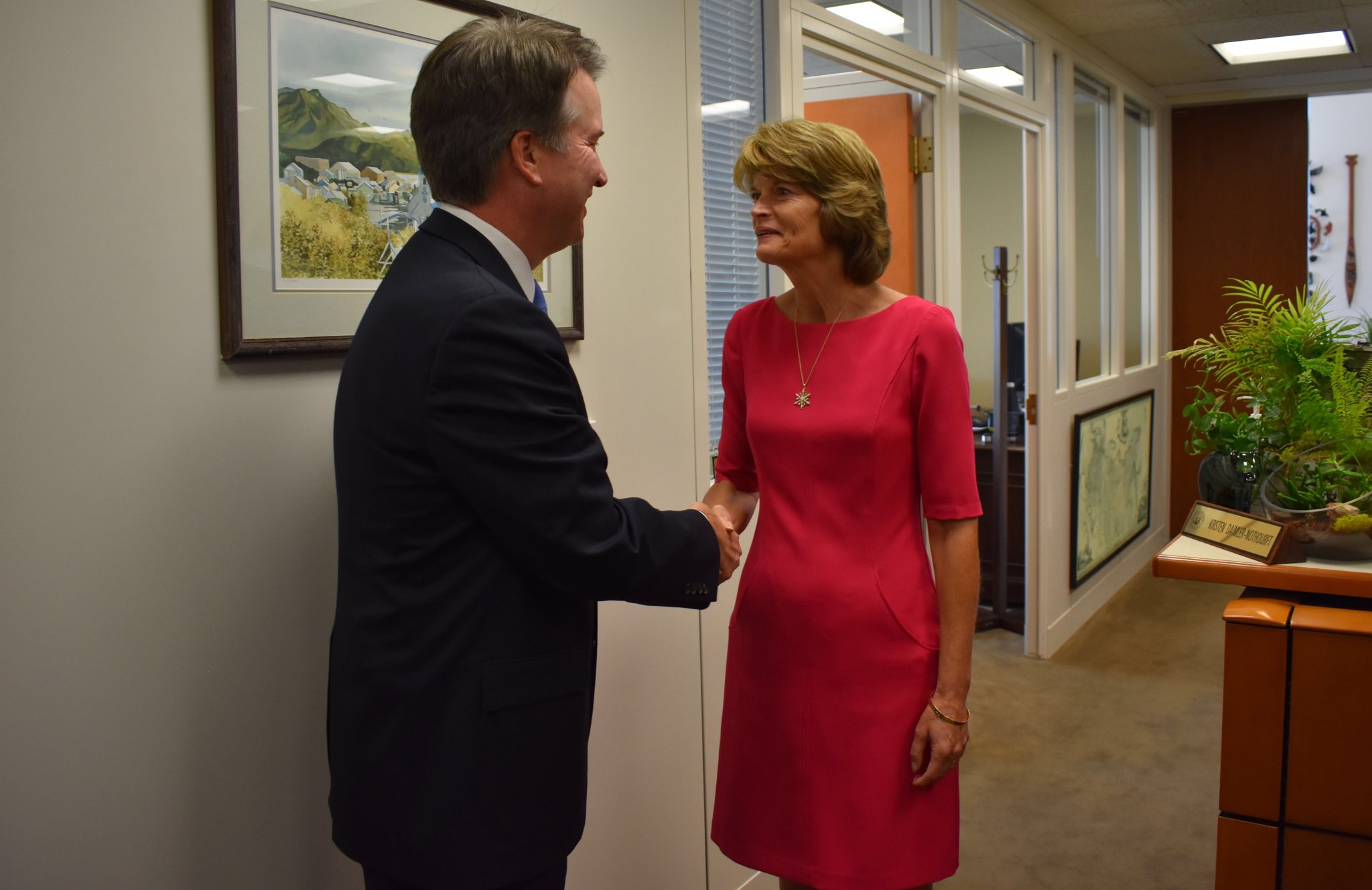
Murkowski and Brett Kavanaugh in August 2018

On April 9, 2010, Justice John Paul Stevens announced his retirement at the start of the Court's summer 2010 recess, President Obama nominating Solicitor General of the United States Elena Kagan to replace him. Murkowski and Senate Judiciary Committee member Orrin Hatch announced their opposition on July 2, Murkowski cited the cautious approach Kagan had while being questioned during her confirmation hearing before the Senate Judiciary Committee and opined that Kagan did not "live up to" a standard she imposed in a 2005 article where Kagan advocated for the Senate to probe the legal views of a nominee to guarantee the constitutional responsibility of advice and consent in the Senate. Murkowski also took issue with Kagan's heritage, saying that while she welcomed that the Obama administration "has substantially increased the representation of women on the high court, it is of greater significance to me that the administration has not increased representation of people from the West or from rural backgrounds on the court."

In February 2016, Supreme Court Justice Antonin Scalia died, which led President Obama to nominate Merrick Garland, a Judge of the D.C. Circuit Court of Appeals, to succeed Scalia. While Murkowski initially supported holding hearings for Garland, she reversed her decision according to her spokeswoman Karina Petersen: "Senator Murkowski respects the decision of the chair and members of the Judiciary Committee not to hold hearings on the nominee." Garland's nomination remained before the Senate for longer than any other Supreme Court nomination in history, and the nomination expired with the end of the 114th Congress.

Murkowski has taken different positions on the so-called "nuclear option", under which the majority party can approve a nominee to the Supreme Court by a simple majority instead of allowing for the Senate's tradition of filibusters. She has said she opposes use of this option, arguing that "it will further inflame partisan passions", and prefers a more bipartisan process. However, in April 2017 the Republican leadership of the Senate used the nuclear option to win approval of Neil Gorsuch to the Court, and Murkowski voted for it.

Because of her pro-abortion rights position, she is often considered a possible "no" vote on appointments to the Supreme Court. In 2017 she voted to confirm the appointment of conservative Neil Gorsuch to the Court. On September 28, 2018, she sided with Senator Jeff Flake (R-AZ) and stated she would not vote to confirm Supreme Court nominee Brett Kavanaugh unless the FBI conducts an investigation of sexual assault allegations made by Christine Blasey Ford and others. On October 5 she was the only Republican who voted against the cloture motion to end debate and advance Kavanaugh's confirmation to a vote; the cloture motion passed 51–49. She was the only Republican who voted against Kavanaugh's confirmation, but she requested to be recorded as 'present' in a process known as a "pair between senators" as a favor to Senator Steve Daines from Montana so that he could attend his daughter's wedding. Since Daines was voting 'yes' and Murkowski voted 'no,' the process allows them to cancel each other's votes. The Alaska Republican Party opposed her decision while the regional Planned Parenthood thanked her for opposing Kavanaugh. On October 24, 2020, Murkowski was one of two Republicans voting against an executive session to move forward with a vote to confirm Judge Amy Coney Barrett, President Trump's third nominee to the Supreme Court. The following day, October 25, she and Collins voted against the motion to invoke cloture on the nomination. However, she said she would vote yes in a floor vote to confirm her to a seat on the court. On October 26, 2020, Murkowski voted to confirm Barrett to the Supreme Court. In April 2022, she announced her support to confirm Biden's nominee, Judge Ketanji Brown Jackson, to the Supreme Court and she was one of three Republicans (joined by Susan Collins and Mitt Romney) to vote with all Democrats in a 53-47 procedural Senate vote to advance Jackson's nomination. On April 7, 2022, she voted to confirm Jackson to the Supreme Court.

=== United States Postal Service ===
In June 2012, Murkowski sent a letter to United States Postmaster General Patrick R. Donahoe regarding information she had heard about the U.S. Postal Service becoming "a main conduit for drug trafficking in Juneau, Petersburg, and other Southeast Alaska communities" and asserted that actions needed to be taken to prevent the USPS from being a drug trafficking avenue, urging Donahoe to consider "whether cross-deputization agreements could be entered with local law enforcement that might allow them to conduct inspections, if they have the resources to do so."

In March 2019, Murkowski was a cosponsor of a bipartisan resolution led by Gary Peters and Jerry Moran that opposed privatization of the United States Postal Service (USPS), citing the USPS as an establishment that was self-sustained and noting concerns that a potential privatization could cause higher prices and reduced services for customers of USPS with a particular occurrence in rural communities.

=== Workplace harassment ===
Throughout early 2018, in her capacity as chair of the Energy Committee, Murkowski pressed officials within the Fish and Wildlife Service, United States Department of Interior, and the Bureau of Indian Affairs about sexual harassment and bullying. Murkowski said in an interview, "It is "almost a culture in certain areas, where it's just, 'Well, you know, if you decided that you're going to work in a man's world, then you should just expect that.' Well that's not right. And that's not what one should expect. And you shouldn't expect that in the military. You shouldn't expect that as a firefighter. You shouldn't expect that in the movie industry. You should just not expect that."

In March 2019, Murkowski and Democratic Senator Kamala Harris reintroduced the Ending the Monopoly of Power Over Workplace Harassment through Education and Reporting (EMPOWER) Act, a bill that would prohibit non-disclosure and non-disparagement clauses used by some employers in employment requirements, Murkowski citing the need "to create an environment of transparency where victims feel empowered to speak up without the fear of retaliation" and promoting the legislation as "a step in the right direction" due to aiding in ending workplace harassment.

== Energy and environment ==
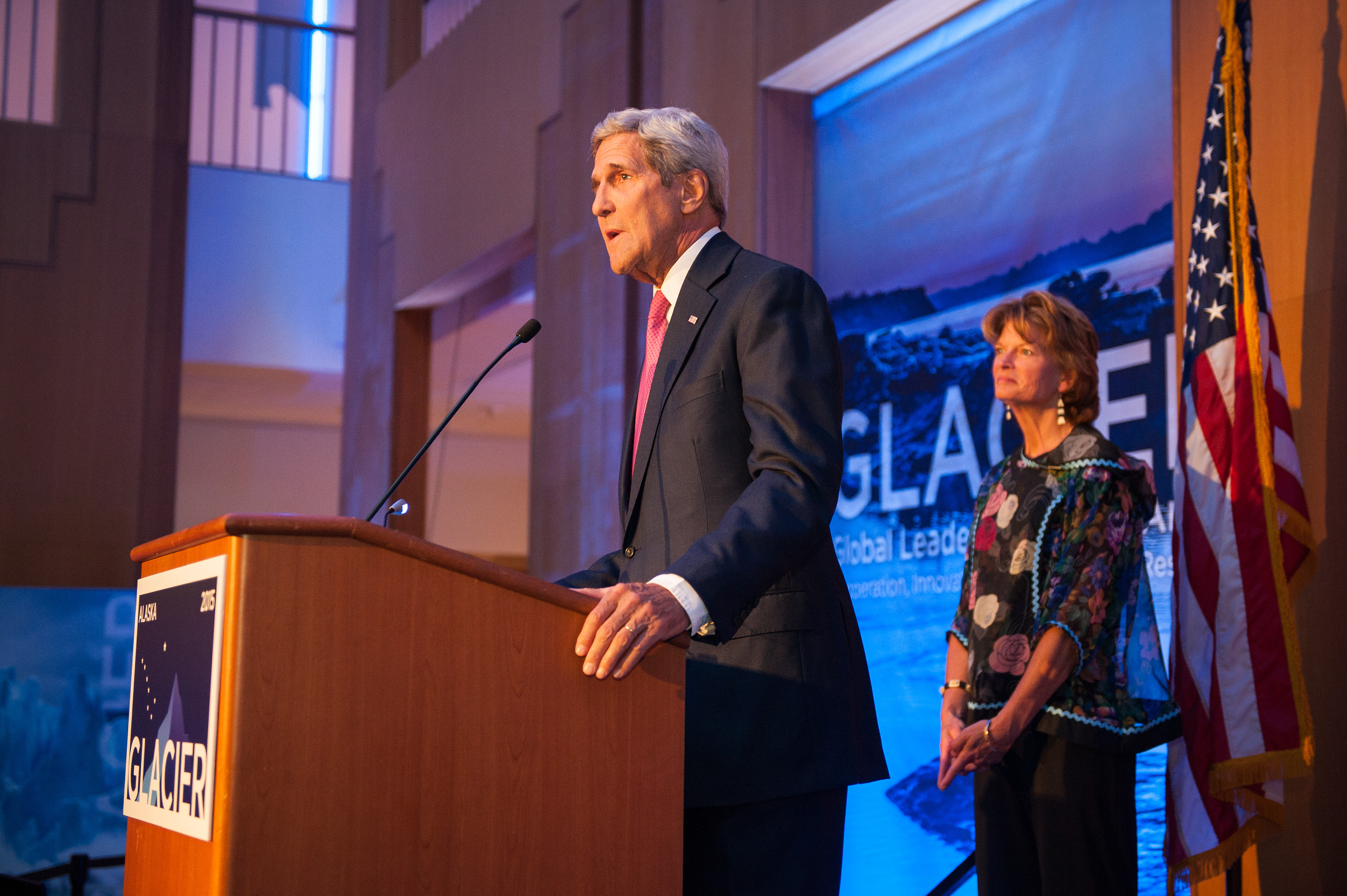
Secretary of State John Kerry and Murkowski discuss the effects of Arctic climate change in Anchorage, Alaska, on August 30, 2015

For the 109th Congress, Republicans for Environmental Protection, a group dedicated to environmental causes, gave Murkowski a rating of 2%, noting that in 2006, she voted against S.C. Resolution 83, intended to bolster energy security and lower energy-related environmental impacts, against an amendment to S. 728 that would make the Army Corps of Engineers more accountable for the environmental and economic impacts of their projects, for oil drilling in the Arctic National Wildlife Refuge, for offshore oil and gas drilling. Murkowski served as the chairman of the Senate Energy and Natural Resources Committee from 2015 to 2021. She has given her support to efforts to drill for oil in the Arctic National Wildlife Refuge (ANWR).

As of 2016, Murkowski believed that technological developments have made drilling safer and more economical.

In July 2019, Murkowski was one of nine lawmakers to become a founding member of the Roosevelt Conservation Caucus, a group of Republican members of Congress meant to focus on environmental issues with specific priorities including reducing water and ocean plastic pollution, and heightening access to public lands and waters in the United States for outdoor recreation, hunting and fishing.

As of 2023, she supported the controversial Willow oil drilling project on Alaska’s North Slope.

According to OpenSecrets, throughout her career, Murkowski has received over 2 million dollars from the Oil & Gas industry.

=== Legislation ===
==== Barack Obama administration ====
Murkowski introduced a bill that would block the Environmental Protection Agency from limiting the amount of greenhouse gases that major industries can produce. In a statement, Murkowski said, "We cannot turn a blind eye to the EPA's efforts to impose back-door climate regulations with no input from Congress."

In the wake of the 2010 Deepwater Horizon oil spill (BP disaster in the Gulf of Mexico), Murkowski opposed a bill that would have raised the liability cap for oil spills from $75 million to $10 billion. She said that such a large cap would jeopardize various businesses, and that exposing companies to greater risk would make it impossible for smaller companies to compete. Murkowski has received over $50,000 from BP.

In April 2015, Murkowski was a co-sponsor of a bill that directed the federal government to establish both temporary and permanent storage sites for waste stemming from nuclear weapons and energy production and mandate storage sites must have the consent of its respective community. Murkowski said, "Nuclear energy is a vital part of America’s energy portfolio and for far too long, the American taxpayer has been on the hook for the federal government’s failure to implement an effective plan to handle the back-end of the nuclear fuel cycle."

In May 2015, Murkowski unveiled 17 bills that she intended to make up an energy reform package during the 114th United States Congress. The bills ranged from topics that included electricity reliability, the Strategic Petroleum Reserve, and methane, hydropower or helium production. Murkowski said that not all of the bills would be included in her proposal and that it was not "about sending a message, this is about changing the policy, and how can we change the policy is by winning, and in order to win, we have to make sure we have the votes that are there."

In February 2016, Murkowski was one of seven senators to offer a bipartisan amendment to the Energy Policy Modernization Act that would repeal the Gulf of Mexico Energy Security Act (GOMESA) revenue sharing cap and authorize states in the Mid-Atlantic and Alaska receive future offshore energy production revenue. Alaska would receive 37.5 percent of royalties with a total of 12.5 percent of its federal treasury revenues distributed to the new Tribal Resilience Program.

In May 2016, Murkowski introduced the Foreign Spill Protection Act of 2016, a bill intended to hold foreign companies accountable for the costs of potential oil spills in U.S. waters. Murkowski cited the need for the bill at a time of increasing shipping in the Arctic.

==== Donald Trump administration ====
In September 2018, Murkowski was the lead cosponsor of the Nuclear Energy Leadership Act, a bill that promoted a "robust public-private partnerships among the federal government, leading research institutions and industry innovators" and provide a fast neutron source that was both versatile and reactor-based.

In December 2018, Murkowski and Democrat Tom Carper introduced the Wood Heaters Emissions Reduction Act, a bill that reduced toxic air pollution in addition to protecting public health and backing an American jobs expansion. The bill also mandated that Indian tribal and rural communities are fairly represented as it pertained to the allocations of funds, Carper saying that the bill "ensures communities that rely on wood heaters have access to cleaner, more affordable ones, reduces toxic pollution in the air we all breathe and creates jobs here at home."

In March 2019, Murkowski was an original cosponsor of a bipartisan bill intended to mandate the Environmental Protection Agency declare per- and polyfluoroalkyl substances as hazardous substances that could be addressed with cleanup funds via the EPA Superfund law in addition to forming a requirement that polluters undertake or pay for remediation within a year of the bill being enacted.

In May 2019, along with Joe Manchin and Martha McSally, Murkowski introduced the American Mineral Security Act, a bill that would codify current methodology that was used by the United States to list critical minerals and require the aforementioned list to be updated at least once over a period of three years. McSally's office also stated the bill would mandate nationwide resource assessments for every critical mineral.

On June 13, 2019, Murkowski, Joe Manchin, Rob Portman, and Cory Gardner introduced the Federal Energy and Water Management Performance Act of 2019, a bill intended to improve federal and energy water performance requirements as they pertained to federal buildings and form a Federal Energy Management Program. The bill also authorized FEMP through fiscal year 2030 and would set goals for energy and water reduction for the following decade.

In June 2019, Murkowski was a sponsor of the Financing Our Energy Future Act, legislation that would make "biomass; renewable fuels; biorefineries; fuel cells; combined-heat-and-power (CHP); carbon capture, utilization and storage (CCUS); solar; wind, marine and hydrokinetic energy; energy storage; waste heat-to-power; and energy efficient buildings" eligible for master limited partnerships.

In March 2020, Murkowski promoted the American Energy Innovation Act as helping "Alaskans pioneer new technologies, ranging from renewables to energy storage and even advanced nuclear, to help lower local energy costs" and said the bill would "protect our cybersecurity, enable Alaska to produce more of the minerals needed for clean technologies, and help us meet the rising threat of climate change." Later that month, the Senate failed to end debate on the American Energy Innovation Act and voted down ending debate on a package of amendments from Murkowski. The HFCs amendment served as the main hold up on the American Energy Innovation Act, with cosponsors John Kennedy and Tom Carper pushing for a vote while it attracted opposition from United States Senate Committee on Environment and Public Works Chairman John Barrasso and the Trump administration. Murkowski told reporters, "You have a few individuals who feel that their priority needs to trump everything else that we're doing around here."

In May 2020, Murkowski and Republican Jim Risch introduced the Energy Infrastructure Protection Act, legislation that would update provisions in the Federal Power Act and impose restrictions on sensitive energy information's federal disclosures. Murkowski called protecting electric infrastructure a matter of national security and said the bill gave "the federal government with additional tools to safeguard the utility industry’s sensitive information" while ensuring critical information in utility operations were not exposed.

=== Public statements ===
==== Barack Obama administration ====
Following a report warning that the Clean Power Plan could hurt the electricity grid of the US in November 2014, Murkowski and Representatives Fred Upton and Ed Whitfield sent a letter to Federal Energy Regulatory Commission chairman Cheryl LaFleur requesting information about any consultation between the FERC and EPA and requested that FERC put together a conference to discuss the environmental regulations: "We can’t afford to play a guessing game when it comes to reliability, and we need to be assured that EPA won’t simply leave Americans in the dark."

In December 2014, after lawmakers submitted a bipartisan series of long-awaited energy and public lands measures to the National Defense Authorization Act that included provisions to enable mineral development projects and expand a program intended to streamline oil and gas drilling permits, Murkowski said in a statement that they had developed "a balanced package that will increase resource production and provide new economic opportunities for western communities." Later that month, the Federal Energy Regulatory Commission announced an investigation into potential risks that proposed federal regulations might impose, Murkowski stating that she appreciated the commission's decision and that a national conference and three regional technical conferences were "no substitute for EPA’s failure to engage FERC and DOE in a formal, documented process to address the impact on electric reliability of EPA’s series of major rule-makings in recent years."

In January 2015, it was announced that President Obama would request Congress impose more protections on the remote wilderness area in the northern reaches of Alaska as to prevent any potential oil or natural gas drilling there. Murkowski lambasted the decision in a statement: "What’s coming is a stunning attack on our sovereignty and our ability to develop a strong economy that allows us, our children and our grandchildren to thrive. It’s clear this administration does not care about us, and sees us as nothing but a territory."

In February 2015, Murkowski told United States Secretary of the Interior Sally Jewell that Jewell had "enabled an unprecedented attack on our ability to responsibly bring these resources to market" via a budget request by the Interior Department and added that President Obama had "withdrawn over 22 million more acres of Alaska from energy production just in recent weeks, and that has occurred on top of many other restrictions and regulations being imposed on us."

In July 2015, after an amendment authored by Bernie Sanders to an energy reform bill was rejected by the Senate Energy and Natural Resources Committee, Murkowski dismissed the amendment as unnecessary due to the resolution approved by the committee earlier in the congressional session along with work done on the same bill: "I think everything that we have done along the way is designed to move us towards that cleaner, more efficient, more responsible, greater focus on our environment, while at the same time ensuring a level of affordability and access to all Americans."

In November 2015, Murkowski and Representatives Ed Whitfield and Fred Upton sent a letter to the Federal Energy Regulatory Commission (FERC) to requesting an examination of the usage of the Public Utility Regulatory Policies Act (PURPA), opining that electricity markets, generation technologies and electric grid investments "changed substantially since PURPA was enacted nearly 40 years ago as part of President Carter’s energy plan."

In January 2016, following an announcement by the U.S. Fish and Wildlife Service (FWS) that the Alexander Archipelago wolf would not be listed as a threatened or endangered species under the Endangered Species Act, Murkowski said in part, "At a time when timber harvesting on Prince of Wales Island is barely a tenth of its levels of two decades ago, the attempt by some environmental groups to list the wolf seemed to be an effort solely to end the last of the remaining timber industry in Southeast Alaska. Fortunately, it did not work."

In July 2016, Murkowski was one of seventeen senators to sign a letter to Interior Secretary Sally Jewell asserting that Air Quality Control, Reporting and Compliance, a proposed Bureau of Ocean Energy Management (BOEM) rule, should be withdrawn due to there being no proof offshore energy production impacts onshore air quality: "Offshore oil and natural gas production are essential to U.S. energy supply. Rather than hinder this production, the department should seek ways to further our energy security."

In August 2016, following the Fish and Wildlife Service (FWS) releasing a rule that preempts the jurisdiction of Alaska over wildlife management in national wildlife refuges in the state, Murkowski wrote that the FWS "has once again decided that it knows what is best for us, and is trampling Alaska’s long-standing right to manage wildlife in refuges" and that she was shocked the policies of the Obama administration were "pointing to a future where we can fill our freezers with genetically engineered salmon, but not the moose and other game we have traditionally harvested in a sustainable manner from our refuges."

In December 2016, after President Obama signed an executive order that designated 112,300 square miles from the Bering Strait to north of Bristol Bay as a "climate resilience area" following consultations with Native Alaskan tribes that relied on the maritime ecosystem for subsistence living, Murkowski took issue with the "climate resilience area" term and said that while she strongly backed "meaningful consultation with tribes, this opens the door to a whole host of unknowns, and could easily be misapplied to block even the most responsible Arctic subsistence, activities, and development."

In December 2016, following President Obama announcing a ban on new oil and gas drilling federal waters in the Atlantic and Arctic Oceans and Canada implementing its own ban in its Arctic waters, Murkowski, fellow Alaska senator Dan Sullivan and Representative Don Young called the announcement "an incredibly lopsided trade for the United States" and theorized that it may be a few years before the United States "is bracketed by activity on both sides and importing the oil resulting from it" while noting Russian development underway in the Arctic.

==== Donald Trump administration ====
In March 2019, Murkowski and Susan Collins were the only Republican senators to sign a letter to the Trump administration advocating for the inclusion of funding for the Low-Income Home Energy Assistance Program (LIHEAP), which they credited with helping "to ensure that eligible recipients do not have to choose between paying their energy bills and affording other necessities like food and medicine", and the Weatherization Assistance Program (WAP) in the fiscal year 2020 budget proposal.

In March 2019, Murkowski and Joe Manchin wrote an op-ed for the Washington Post in which they wrote that climate change debate in Congress was depicted as "an issue with just two sides — those who support drastic, unattainable measures to reduce greenhouse-gas emissions, and those who want to do nothing" and affirmed their support "to adopting reasonable policies that maintain that edge, build on and accelerate current efforts, and ensure a robust innovation ecosystem."

On July 19, 2019, Murkowski delivered a speech to Commonwealth North in Anchorage where she noted that it had been twelve years since Congress passed a full-scale update to federal laws covering energy development, security, reliability and innovation, citing the laws as outdated due to advancements in technology since.

In October 2019, Murkowski delivered a speech at the 11th North American Infrastructure Leadership Forum where she expressed frustration in regard to the Liquefied Natural Gas (LNG) Pipeline project being held up in Alaska during a regulatory process and cited the need for the U.S. to maintain its present position as an energy superpower.

In October 2019, Murkowski was one of six senators to sign a letter to the U.S. International Development Finance Corp. urging the rescinding of an international nuclear energy financing ban. Murkowski stated that prosperity from energy "requires long-term investments and relationships, which ultimately form the basis for any enhancement to our national security" and that civil nuclear projects were unattainable "without the diplomatic agreements and a substantial government-backed financing."

In April 2020, Murkowski sent a letter to United States Secretary of Treasury requesting an assurance that oil and gas companies would receive federal loans provided for businesses in the coronavirus stimulus package: "Producing companies and the businesses that contract with them are being impacted not only by the market demand shock from the coronavirus, but also the Russia-Saudi Arabia power struggle against American energy."

In May 2020, Murkowski requested the Federal Emergency Management Agency (FEMA), United States Department of Health and Human Services (HHS), the United States Department of Agriculture (USDA) and United States Department of the Interior (DOI) unite in the allocation of personal protective equipment (PPE) and COVID-19 tests for federal wildland fire crews. Murkowski opined that the "federal government has a unique responsibility to ensure a sufficient supply chain of PPE and rapid testing for all wildfire crews, in coordination with their state counterpart" as a result of the intergovernmental nature of the wildland fire response of the federal government.

In June 2020, Murkowski agreed with a strong rebuke of Trump's policies, published in The Atlantic, authored by former Defense Secretary James Mattis'. Mattis criticized the president for dividing the country, and for improperly using his presidential powers. She said the article was "true and honest and necessary and overdue." Murkowski also stated that she had reservations about voting for Trump in the 2020 election. In return on twitter, Trump pledged to campaign for Murkowski's opponent, "good or bad", in 2022. When asked about Trump's tweet, Murkowski did not walk back her previous comments and said she could not be concerned over a tweet.

=== Votes ===
A major supporter of fossil fuels, Murkowski joined most of her Republican colleagues in repealing the Stream Protection Rule, a regulation which prevented coal companies from dumping coal in waterways.

In March 2019, Murkowski joined all Senate Republicans, three Democrats, and Angus King in voting against the Green New Deal resolution, a proposal that strove for net-zero greenhouse gas emissions in the US and the creation of millions of high wage jobs. In her floor speech Murkowski called for reducing domestic and global emissions through the development of clean resources and called for other lawmakers to join her in seeking bipartisan solutions in support of innovation and efficiency: "We’ve got to take these policies that can keep us moving to lower emissions, to address the reality of climate change, to do so all the while that we are recognizing that we’ve got an economy that we need to keep strong, that we have vulnerable people that we need to protect, that we have an environment that we all care about—Republicans and Democrats."

== National security ==
=== Surveillance ===
In July 2003, Murkowski introduced the Protecting the Rights of Individuals Act, a bill that would limit searches under the USA Patriot Act to the records of individuals who were foreign agents engaged in either acts of espionage or terrorism.

In November 2005, along with Democrats Dick Durbin, Russ Feingold, and Ken Salazar and Republicans Larry Craig and John E. Sununu, Murkowski wrote a letter to the Senate Judiciary and Intelligence committees indicating that the six would stop a measure to renew the Patriot Act unless further changes were made.

=== Veterans ===
In September 2012, along with Susan Collins, Scott Brown, Olympia Snowe, and Dean Heller, Murkowski was one of five Republicans to waive objections to a Democratic bill that would have given priority to post-9/11 veterans at the time their employment prospects were three points below the national average. Republicans opposed the bill on the grounds that it violated spending limits agreed to in Congress the previous year and it failed to get the 60 votes to go forward with the bill.

In May 2014, Murkowski signed on to the Suicide Prevention for America's Veterans Act, which if enacted would form a reviewing process of discharges related to mental health issues and promote growth in the VA psychiatry ranks through repaying medical school loans. Democratic Senator John Walsh said, "It is our duty to come together and fight on behalf of those who fought for us, and Sen. Murkowski’s support will strengthen this bill and send the urgent message that our veterans need care now." In June, Murkowski sent a letter to the VA Office of Inspector General requesting a review of the operational practices of the Wasilla Community Based Outpatient Clinic and an investigation into claims that the Alaska VA Healthcare System in Anchorage used fake appointments in 2008 in order to make waiting times appear shorter. Murkowski's press secretary Matthew Felling said the senator wrote the letter to expedite an investigation after viewing the "unraveling in the community morale-wise and frustration-wise". In November, Murkowski introduced the Clay Hunt Suicide Prevention bill, legislation that would mandate the Pentagon and VA submit an independent review of their suicide prevention programs and form a website that would provide consolidated information on mental health services available to veterans. The bill was named for Clay Hunt, a former Marine who committed suicide in 2011 following seeking treatment for both combat-related depression and post-traumatic stress disorder.

In March 2018, along with Democratic senators Tom Udall and Tammy Duckworth, Murkowski introduced the Military Hunger Prevention Act, a bill that altered language in federal law for the purpose of eliminating inconsistencies that prevented service members in need from accessing the federal food assistance programs. Murkowski declared that American military families "enough to worry about as they defend our nation’s security." In May, Murkowski introduced S. 2897 with Sherrod Brown (D-OH) and Rob Portman (R-OH), which made up half of bipartisan legislation that would authorize states can postpone using Electronic Visit Verification (EVV) systems to ensure personal care services were billed correctly in place. Murkowski said the bill "ensures that Alaskans have adequate time to thoughtfully develop an effective EVV system based on the input of our family caregivers and stakeholders so patients receive the quality services they need and deserve." In June 2018, when Murkowski announced that the military and veteran affairs budget for federal Fiscal Year 2019 cleared the Senate Appropriations Committee with committee's consent for continued investment in Alaska military installation and programs, Murkowski said, "Alaska has the highest veteran population per capita in the country. I remain committed to equipping our veterans with the support they need, including ensuring that Alaska’s VA health facilities are fully staffed and deliver the quality of care veterans deserve."

In February 2019, with Democratic senators Jon Tester and Tammy Duckworth and Representative Chellie Pingree, Murkowski reintroduced the Servicemember and Veterans’ Empowerment and Support Act, legislation that increased the definition of MST to ensure service members and veterans that experienced online sexual harassment would have access to VA counseling and benefits. In April 2019, Murkowski and Democratic Senator Brian Schatz introduced the Compacts of Free Association Veterans Review Act, legislation that would form a pilot program to improve access to care for veterans living in Palau, the Marshall Islands and the Federated States of Micronesia. In a news release, Murkowski spoke of the progress made in Alaska "to ensure our veterans have access to care, closer to home, and my goal is that we do all we can to ensure all our veterans receive the care they need and deserve." In December 2019, Murkowski and Democratic Senator Chris Coons introduced the Justice for ALS Veterans Act, intended to mandate surviving spouses and families of veterans who die from amyotrophic lateral sclerosis receive needed benefits.

== Foreign policy ==
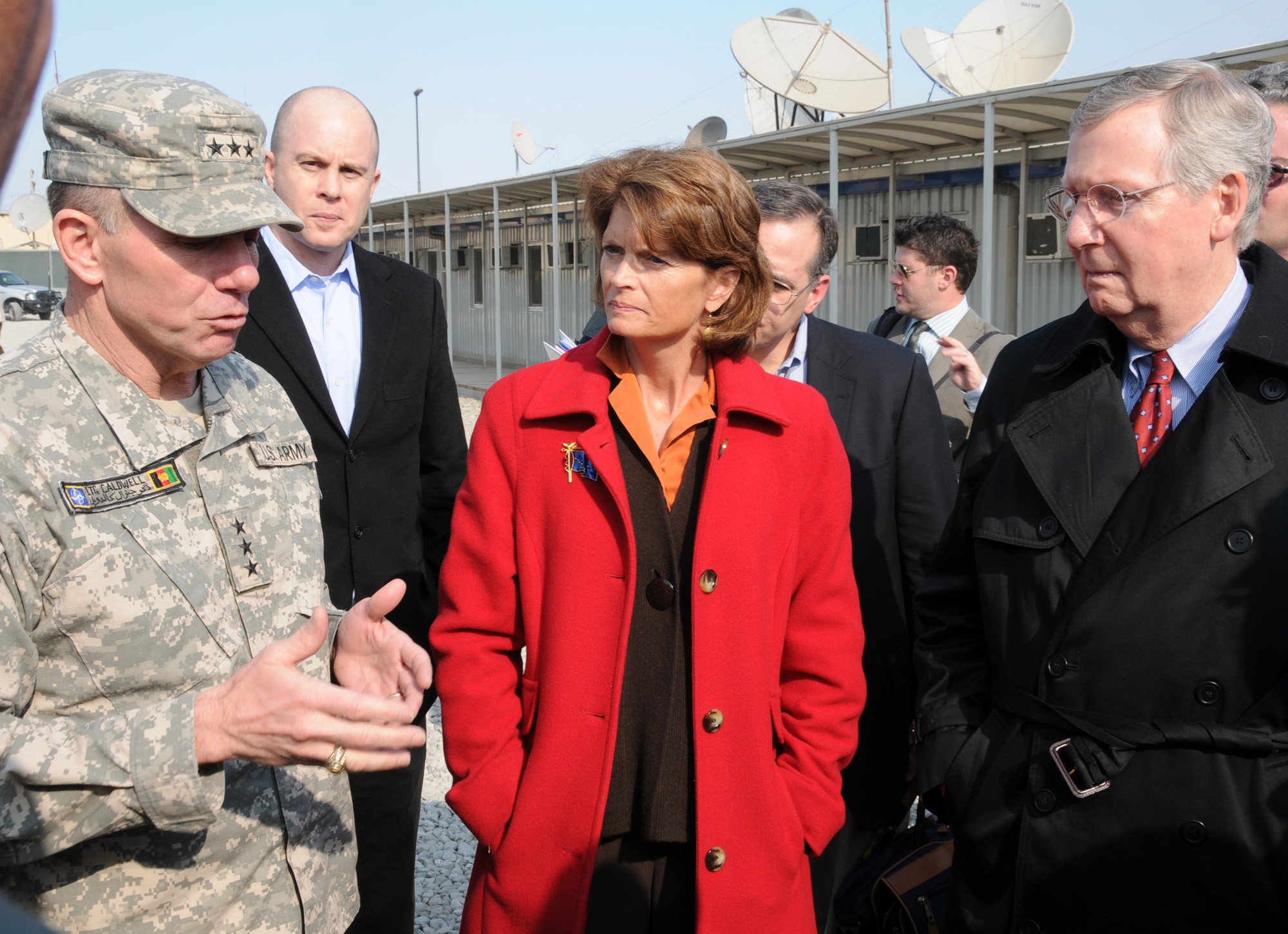
Murkowski and Mitch McConnell in Afghanistan, 2010

=== Cuba ===
In 2011, members of the Obama administration kept watch over the offshore drilling projects of Cuba out of concern that an oil spill could threaten America's coast, though they were limited in their surveillance due to the U.S. embargo against Cuba. Murkowski warned against focusing on Cuba, calling it "a reality that you’ve got exploration going all around the globe offshore" while speaking with reporters: "It’s not just Cuba. It’s Mexico; it’s Jamaica; it’s the Bahamas; it’s Canada; it’s Russia; it’s everybody that has water around their nation that is looking to explore and produce. The focus was Cuba. But I’m not going to get hung up on whether we need to now lift the embargoes against Cuba."

=== Iran ===
In March 2015, along with Susan Collins, Thad Cochran, Bob Corker, Dan Coats, Jeff Flake, and Lamar Alexander, Murkowski was one of seven Senate Republicans to not sign a letter organized by Tom Cotton to Iranian leaders to inform them that any nuclear deal they reach with the United States would be “nothing more than an executive agreement.” In June, Murkowski released a report where she warned that US oil production would be negatively impacted by more Iranian crude oil and that lifting Iranian sanctions "without also lifting the ban on U.S. exports will allow Iran to compete in markets largely inaccessible to American companies."

In May 2018, Trump announced the United States' unilateral departure from the Iran nuclear deal. Murkowski supported the move, calling the agreement "a fatally flawed deal" and wrote that she looked "forward to hearing more about the President’s plan to ensure Iran does not develop nuclear weapons. Because the thought, let alone the reality, of Iran becoming a nuclear nation remains unacceptable."

In January 2020, President Trump ordered a targeted U.S. airstrike on January 2, 2020, which killed Iranian Major General and IRGC Quds Force commander Qasem Soleimani and Iraqi Popular Mobilization Forces commander Abu Mahdi al-Muhandis, as well as eight other people. Murkowski co-sponsored a resolution by Ted Cruz commending President and the United States Armed Forces and intelligence community for the operation, saying that Soleimani and the Iranian Quds Force were "responsible for the deaths of hundreds of American service members and repeated attacks on American facilities, including the horrible and unacceptable attacks on the U.S. Embassy in Baghdad that recently took place." Murkowski called the operation's activities "significant, decisive and eliminated one of the greatest threats to peace in the region" and stated her hopes to find a path toward de-escalation through "collaboration and continued briefings with my colleagues, the administration and members of the military community".

In February 2020, Murkowski was one of eight Senate Republicans to vote for a resolution by Senator Tim Kaine would require Trump to pull any U.S. troops from military hostilities against Iran within 30 day until receiving congressional approval for the military actions.

=== Russia ===
In December 2010, Murkowski voted for the ratification of New START, a nuclear arms reduction treaty between the United States and Russian Federation obliging both countries to have no more than 1,550 strategic warheads as well as 700 launchers deployed during the next seven years along with providing a continuation of on-site inspections that halted when START I expired the previous year. It was the first arms treaty with Russia in eight years.

In September 2016, Murkowski was one of thirty-four senators to sign a letter to United States Secretary of State John Kerry advocating for the United States using "all available tools to dissuade Russia from continuing its airstrikes in Syria that are clearly not in our interest" and that there should be clear enforcement by the US of the airstrikes violating "a legally binding Security Council Resolution".

=== Yemen ===
In March 2018, Murkowski voted to table a resolution spearheaded by Bernie Sanders, Chris Murphy, and Mike Lee that would have required President Trump to withdraw American troops either in or influencing Yemen within the next 30 days unless they were combating Al-Qaeda. Murkowski voted against the resolution again in December, explaining, "The human rights abuses that are taking place in Yemen must stop, and the kingdom must also be put on notice that assassinating journalists will not be blithely dismissed and ignored" but added that she would not "support a resolution that would have undermined U.S. strategic interests in the Middle East, emboldened Iran and leave our country without immediate recourse should the Houthi rebels attack U.S. defense assets and interests in the region." In March 2019, Murkowski was one of seven Republicans to vote for the resolution withdrawing American forces form Yemen within 30 days unless they were engaging al Qaeda forces. In May 2019, she was also one of seven Republicans voting to override Trump's veto of the previous Yemen resolution. In June 2019, Murkowski was one of seven Republicans to vote to block President Trump's Saudi arms deal providing weapons to Saudi Arabia, United Arab Emirates and Jordan, but also voted for the Trump administration's additional 20 arms sales.

=== Canada ===
In June 2019, Murkowski was one of eight senators to sign a letter to Premier of British Columbia John Horgan expressing concern over "the lack of oversight of Canadian mining projects near multiple transboundary rivers that originate in B.C. and flow into" U.S. states Alaska, Idaho, Washington, and Montana. The senators requested British Columbia replicate American efforts to protect watersheds.

=== Defense ===
In July 2019, Murkowski was one of sixteen Republican senators to send a letter to Acting Office of Management and Budget (OMB) Director Russell Vought, Acting White House Chief of Staff Mick Mulvaney, and Treasury Secretary Steven Mnuchin encouraging them to work with them to prevent a continuing resolution "for FY 2020 that would delay the implementation of the President’s National Defense Strategy (NDS) and increase costs" and that the year long continuing resolution suggested by administration officials would render the Defense Department "incapable of increasing readiness, recapitalizing our force, or rationalizing funding to align with the National Defense Strategy (NDS)."

=== Foreign markets ===
In July 2019, along with Martin Heinrich, Murkowski was one of two senators to introduce the Safeguard Tribal Objects of Patrimony (STOP) Act, a bill that would further penalties within the United States for trafficking objects held sacred by tribes through an increase in prison time from five to ten years for violating the law twice or more and form a framework for collectors to return protected items to tribes without facing penalties. The bill was part of a bipartisan effort to ban collectors and vendors from exporting Native American ceremonial items to foreign markets. Murkowski stated they were "actively preserving the cultural identity and history of our Native populations" through both the protection and repatriation of tribal cultural heritage and that returning the items would aid Native communities in healing from cultural oppression.

=== North Korea ===
In June 2006, Murkowski called for the United States to focus on North Korea's nuclear weapons program ahead of other issues: "While the issues of currency counterfeiting, weapons proliferation, and human rights are all very important, the reality is that without an agreement on the primary source of irritation, there will be no progress on the other issues either." Murkowski warned of growing division among nations involved in multilateral nuclear talks, citing the view of the South Korean and Chinese governments that the counterfeiting issue gave North Korea an excuse to boycott discussions.

In March 2017, following recent missile tests conducted by the North Korean military that saw some landed approximately 600 miles off the coast of regional American ally Japan, Murkowski was a cosponsor of a bill by Ted Cruz to re-list North Korea as a state sponsor of terrorism.

On June 12, 2018, President Trump and North Korean leader Kim Jong-un held a summit in Singapore, resulting in North Korea affirming its intention "to work toward complete denuclearization of the Korean Peninsula". In an interview with reporter Peter Zampa, Murkowski said she supported "the goal of what was outlined, which is complete denuclearization of North Korea" and that in the event there is "committed willingness on both sides, really by all the world's partners here, perhaps we can achieve this peace that has alluded us for so many decades." She furthered that the meeting did not "condone the atrocities that we have seen from North Korea regarding how they have treated their people" but that it did present "the opportunity for working towards a goal which we have been talking about, again, for decades."

In April 2019, Murkowski was part of a congressional delegation that toured South Korea and Vietnam which included a visit to the Demilitarized Zone and was briefed in South Korea "on the recent events happening in the region". She asserted that North Korea "remains one of the country’s primary security threats."

=== Saudi Arabia ===
In March 2020, Murkowski and five other Senate Republicans sent a letter to Secretary of State Mike Pompeo urging him to advocate to Saudi Arabia that the country leave the Organization of Petroleum-Exporting Countries, calling the organization "a relic of a cartelized past, one that burdens the Kingdom with free-riders and forces it to shoulder the lion’s share of every production decision." They asserted Saudi Arabia should instead collaborate with the US on international strategic energy infrastructure projects and become "a free market energy powerhouse."
