= Judy Chang =

American government official and academic

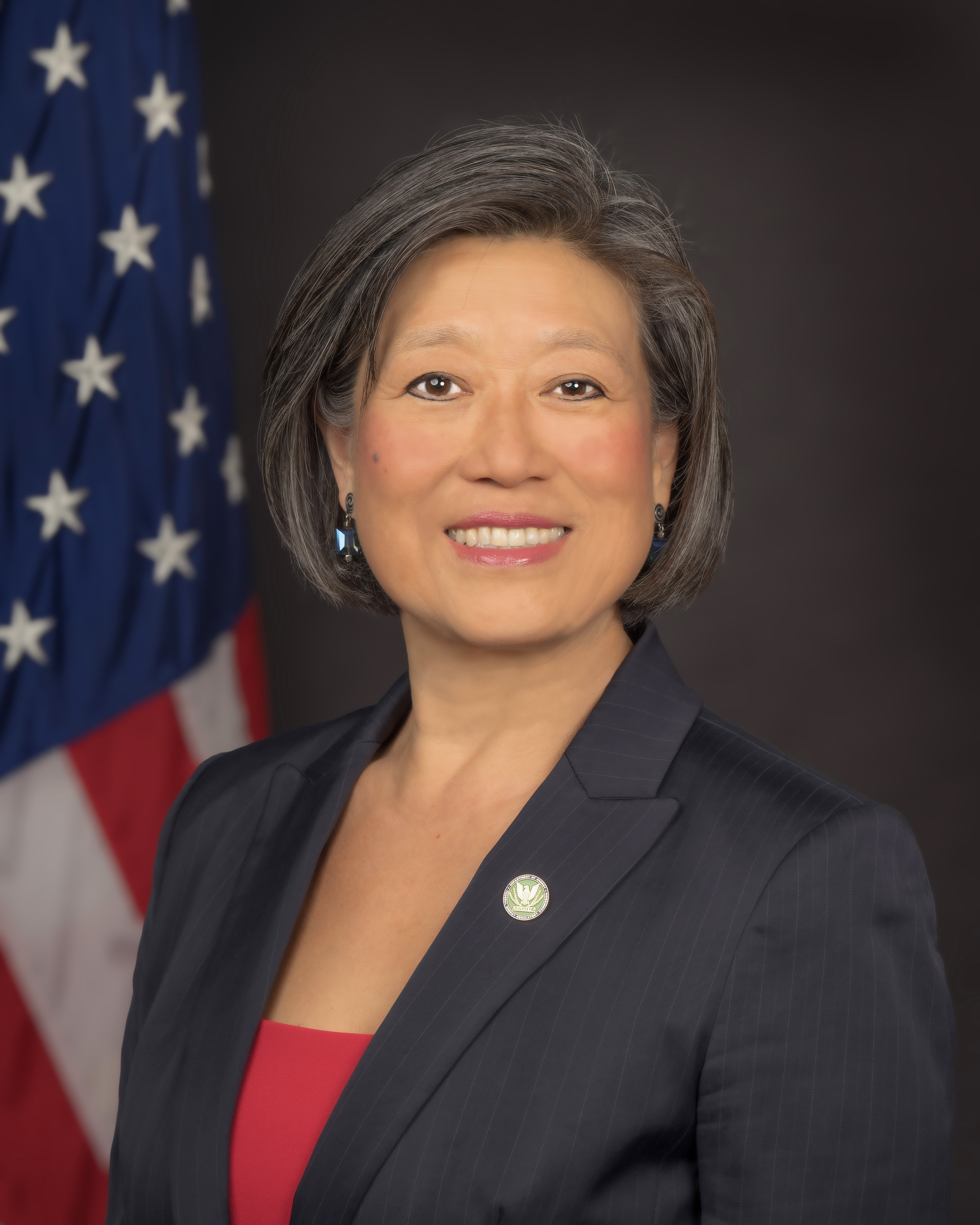
- Official portrait, 2024

Member of the Federal Energy Regulatory Commission
- Incumbent
- Assumed office July 15, 2024
- President: Joe Biden; Donald Trump
- Preceded by: Allison Clements

Massachusetts Undersecretary of Energy and Climate Solutions
- In office June 2020 – January 2023
- Governor: Charlie Baker
- Preceded by: Patrick Woodcock
- Succeeded by: Michael Judge

Personal details
- Political party: Democratic
- Spouse: James MacNeil
- Education: University of California, Davis (BS); Harvard University (MPP)

Judy Wei Ya Chang is an American government official and academic who has been a member of the Federal Energy Regulatory Commission (FERC) since 2024. She previously served as undersecretary of the Massachusetts Executive Office of Energy and Environmental Affairs under Governor Charlie Baker.
