= Allison Clements =

American lawyer and government official

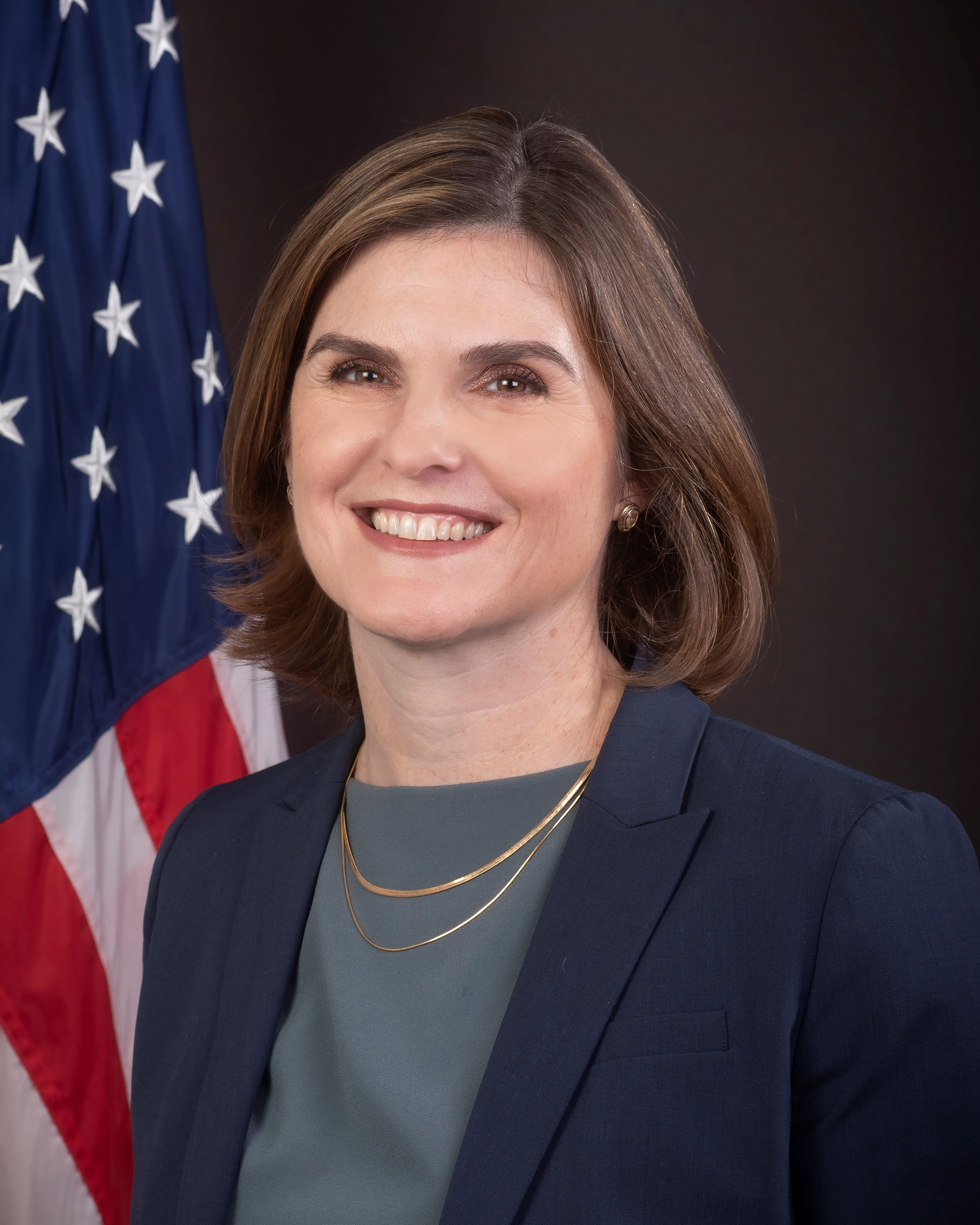
- Official portrait, 2022

Member of the Federal Energy Regulatory Commission
- In office December 8, 2020 – June 30, 2024
- President: Donald Trump; Joe Biden
- Preceded by: Cheryl LaFleur
- Succeeded by: Judy Chang

Personal details
- Born: Allison Suzanne Clements
- Political party: Democratic
- Spouse: Raymond Henger
- Education: University of Michigan (BS); George Washington University Law School (JD)
- Occupation: Lawyer

Allison Suzanne Clements is an American lawyer and government official, who served as a member of the Federal Energy Regulatory Commission (FERC) from 2020 to 2024.
