= Norman Bay =

American attorney (born 1960)

- 白曉川

Chairman of the Federal Energy Regulatory Commission
- In office April 15, 2015 – January 23, 2017
- President: Barack Obama; Donald Trump
- Preceded by: Cheryl LaFleur
- Succeeded by: Cheryl LaFleur

Member of the Federal Energy Regulatory Commission
- In office August 4, 2014 – January 26, 2017
- President: Barack Obama; Donald Trump

U.S. Attorney for the District of New Mexico
- In office September 8, 2000 – October 15, 2001
- President: Bill Clinton
- Succeeded by: David Iglesias

Personal details
- Born: 1960 (age 65–66) Champaign-Urbana, Illinois, U.S.
- Education: Dartmouth College (BA); Harvard University (JD)

Norman C. Bay (Chinese: 白曉川; pinyin: Bái Xiǎochuān; born 1960) is an American attorney. He is the former United States Attorney for the District of New Mexico. Bay was the first Chinese-American United States Attorney. Bay is the former chairman of the Federal Energy Regulatory Commission. He is currently a partner at the law firm of Willkie Farr & Gallagher.

== Background ==
A second-generation Chinese-American, Bay was born to a father of Hebei descent and a mother of Shanghai descent, who immigrated together to the United States after World War II. Bay was raised in Albuquerque, New Mexico, and graduated from Albuquerque Academy. He attended Dartmouth College and Harvard Law School.

After law school, he clerked for Judge Otto Richard Skopil Jr. of the United States Court of Appeals for the Ninth Circuit. He then worked in the Legal Adviser's Office of the United States Department of State. From 1989 to 2000, he was a federal prosecutor in the District of Columbia and in New Mexico. Before becoming a United States Attorney, he was a supervisor of the Violent Crime Section in New Mexico. As an Assistant U.S. Attorney, he tried cases in D.C. Superior Court and U.S. District Court in the District of Columbia and New Mexico. He also has experience in appellate advocacy and has argued a number of cases in the D.C. Court of Appeals, the D.C. Circuit, and the 10th Circuit Court of Appeals that have resulted in reported opinions.

== United States Attorney ==
Attorney General Janet Reno named Bay as the Interim U.S. Attorney in New Mexico on March 8, 2000. At the time Bay was named Interim U.S. Attorney, he was a supervisor in the U.S. Attorney's Office in New Mexico and had been an Assistant U.S. Attorney for more than a decade. President Bill Clinton nominated Bay to the Senate on May 25, 2000, and the Senate unanimously confirmed Bay on September 8, 2000.

As United States Attorney in New Mexico, Bay inherited the Wen Ho Lee case, which had been charged before Bay took office. This case involved a Chinese-American scientist accused of mishandling nuclear secrets. Six months after Bay became Interim U.S. Attorney, the case was resolved through a plea agreement. At the hearing, Judge James Parker criticized other top government officials but called Bay an "outstanding" member of the Bar whom he held in the "highest regard."

After his successor, David Iglesias, was confirmed by the Senate, Bay resigned as U.S. Attorney on October 15, 2001.

== Academia ==
In the spring of 2002, Bay began teaching at the University of New Mexico School of Law. He became a tenured professor of law, and his subjects included constitutional law, criminal law, and evidence. His scholarship interests included national security law and criminal procedure, and he wrote in both of those areas.

== Federal Energy Regulatory Commission ==
In 2009, Bay became the Director of Enforcement at the Federal Energy Regulatory Commission in Washington, D.C. According to Reuters in 2012, "FERC’s Office of Enforcement, run by Norman Bay, has stepped up its game lately, taking the lead among regulators in cracking down on trades that cross both physical and financial markets." In 2013, an energy trade journal named Bay as one of the top ten most influential people in energy.

Harvard Professor William Hogan expressed concern about FERC's Office of Enforcement's practices. Hogan said the Office's practices were "alarming" and could "unravel" the power markets. In its case against FERC, Deutsche Bank stated that FERC's views were "radical," though it later settled the case for nearly $1.7 million, including over $170,000 in "unjust profits" without admitting or denying wrongdoing. J.P. Morgan paid $410 million to settle the FERC investigation without admitting wrongdoing. J.P. Morgan stated "We strongly dispute that Blythe Masters or any employee lied or acted inappropriately in this matter."

On January 30, 2014, Bay was nominated by President Barack Obama as Commissioner of the Federal Energy Regulatory Commission, and upon appointment to be made chairman of the commission.

On May 20, 2014, Bay appeared before the Senate Energy and Natural Resources Committee for his confirmation hearing. Bay was introduced by former Republican Senate Energy and Natural Resources Chairman Pete Domenici (R-NM) and Senate Energy Committee member Martin Heinrich (D-NM). The former Energy Chairman testified, "The job that he is seeking demands somebody just like him," Domenici said. "And obviously I would urge that this Committee support him. "I'm not a great fan of the President of the United States and people know that, but I think this is a great appointment. So I am on his side on this. I don't see how you can miss." On July 15, 2014, Lisa Murkowski reiterated her opposition to the nomination of Norman Bay. Among other things, she said, "To begin, there are questions about the fairness and transparency of the functioning of the FERC Enforcement Office during Mr. Bay’s tenure there. I haven’t resolved those questions, but I know that others are looking at them."

On June 18, 2014, the Committee approved Bay to lead FERC and he was voted out of committee 13–9. He was subsequently confirmed by the Senate 52–45 on July 15, 2014.

Under his tenure, FERC moved up in rankings based on the Federal Employee Viewpoint Survey, and FERC was the highest rated mid-sized agency in 2017.

Bay resigned from FERC in January 2017.
