= Cheryl LaFleur =

American lawyer

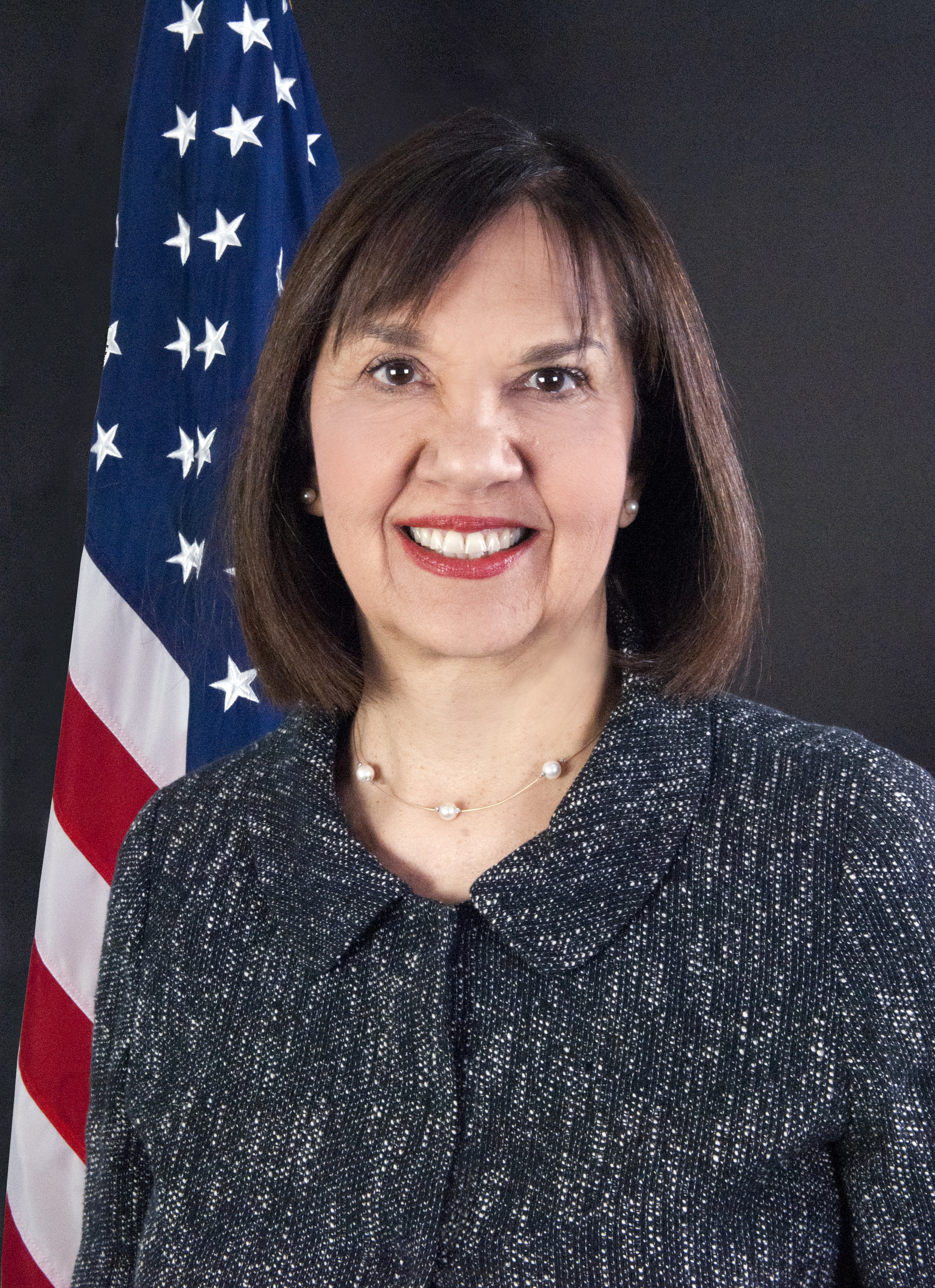
- Official portrait, 2016

Member of the Federal Energy Regulatory Commission
- In office July 13, 2010 – August 30, 2019
- President: Barack Obama; Donald Trump
- Preceded by: Suedeen G. Kelly
- Succeeded by: Allison Clements

Chair of the Federal Energy Regulatory Commission
- In office November 25, 2013 – April 14, 2015 (Note: Served in acting capacity from November 25, 2013 to July 30, 2014)
- Preceded by: Jon Wellinghoff
- Succeeded by: Norman Bay
- Acting; January 23, 2017 – August 10, 2017
- Preceded by: Norman Bay
- Succeeded by: Neil Chatterjee

Personal details
- Born: Massachusetts, U.S.
- Political party: Democratic
- Spouse: William Kuncik
- Children: 2
- Education: Princeton University (BA); Harvard Law School (JD)

Cheryl LaFleur is an American attorney, executive, and government official who served as one of the 5 Commissioners of the Federal Energy Regulatory Commission (FERC) from 2010 to 2019. During her tenure as a Commissioner, she served as Chairman or Acting Chairman November 25, 2013 - April 14, 2015 and again January 23, 2017 - August 10, 2017. In September 2019, she was elected to the Board of Directors of ISO New England, beginning October 1, 2019.

Prior to joining FERC, she was the executive vice president and acting CEO of the utility company National Grid plc. She began her legal career at the law firm of Ropes & Gray.
