= Schwartze Mansion =

Historic house in Maryland, United States

- U.S. National Register of Historic Places
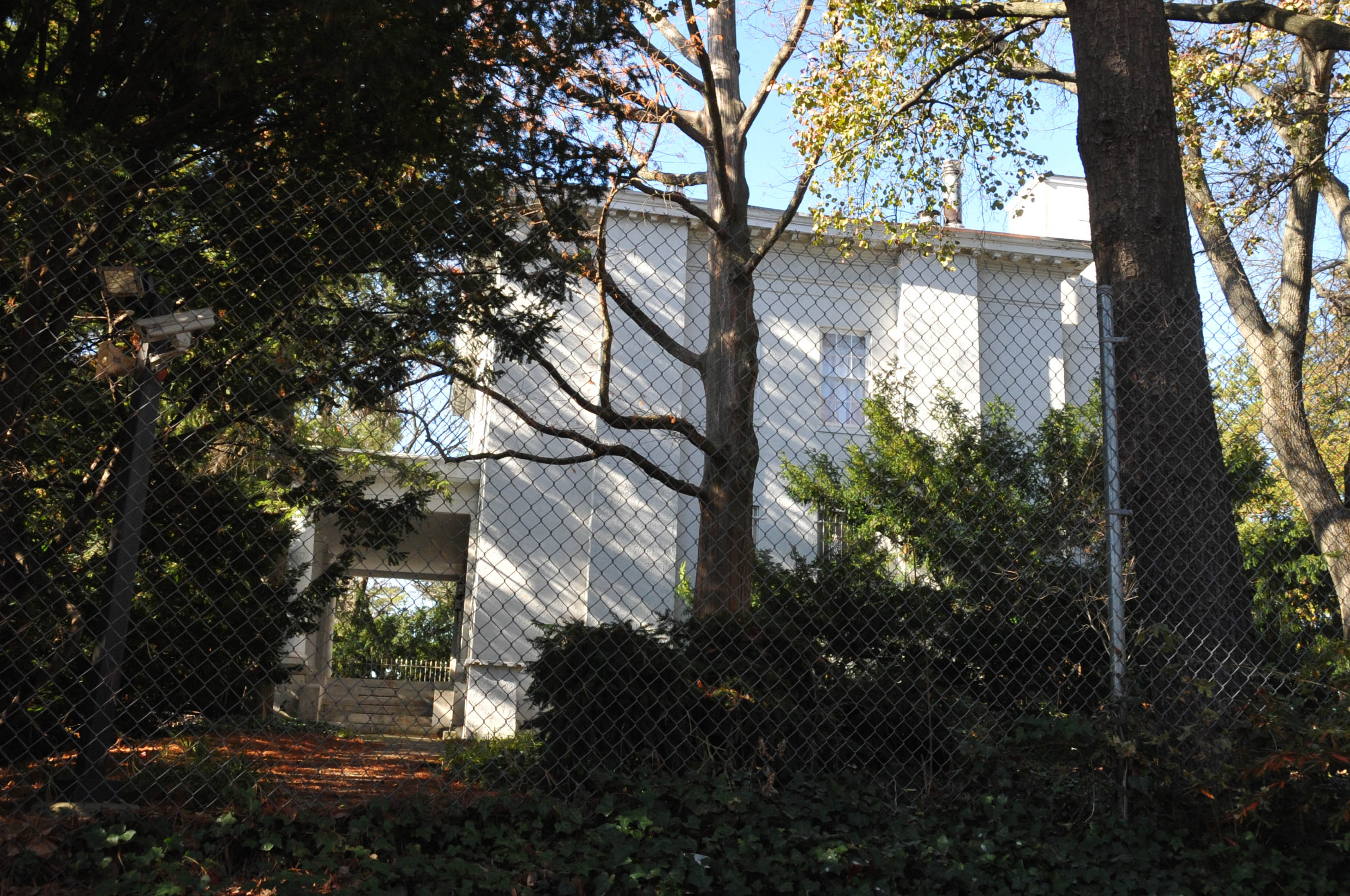

- Location within Baltimore Location within Maryland Location within the United States
- Location: 4206 Euclid Ave., Baltimore, Maryland
- Coordinates: 39°16′58″N 76°41′10″W
- Area: 0.8 acres (0.32 ha)
- Built: 1845
- Architectural style: Greek Revival
- NRHP reference No.: 85002174
- Added to NRHP: September 12, 1985

Schwartze Mansion (or Ditty Mansion or The Augusta) is a historic home located at Baltimore, Maryland, United States in the Irvington neighborhood. It is a two-story, five bay brick Greek Revival building constructed in 1845. It features a flat roofline embellished with a deep modillioned cornice above a frieze decorated with recessed panels.

== History ==
The mansion was built in 1845 by Augustus Jacob Schwartze, a German immigrant who arrived in Baltimore in 1793. He was involved in Baltimore's early 19th-century textile industry and in 1809 was a stock investor in the Union Manufacturing Company near Ellicott City, Maryland. This was the first manufacturing company to be incorporated in the state and was, for a time, the largest textile mill in the nation. He was also president of two insurance companies: the Chesapeake Marine Insurance Company and the American Mutual Marine Insurance Company. Schwartze earned a doctorate of medicine in 1829 from Washington Medical College but never practiced in Baltimore.

In 1830, Augustus' son, Henry Schwartze (1795-1850), acquired 152 acres on the western outskirts of Baltimore. The purchase was probably financed by his father's investments, even though Henry was the registered owner. Henry and Augustus built the house on the property in 1845, intending for the senior Augustus to live with Henry's wife and children. That same year, Henry's six-year-old son Augustus laid the cornerstone for the house. The home reportedly cost $60,000 and featured bricks imported from England. Henry had six slaves. Henry died suddenly in 1850 at age 55, and his will bequeathed the property to his wife, Sophia (1805-1887), and to his father in trust for his children.

Twenty-three years later, in October 1868, Henry's daughter, also named Sophia (1845-1932), married C. Irving Ditty (1838-1887), a prominent Baltimore attorney and political campaigner. Ditty had served as a Confederate officer during the Civil War with Sophia's brother, Augustus Schwartze (1839-1864). In early January 1864, the two friends formed 1st Maryland Cavalry Battalion at their own expense. On May 9, 1864, they were engaged in the battle of Beaverdam station in Virginia. Augustus was gravely injured and died about a month later in a Union hospital in Washington, D.C. Three years after the war, Ditty married his deceased friend's sister, and moved into the house with Sophia and her mother.

By early 1870, less than two years after the marriage, Ditty began selling off the land around the mansion on behalf of Henry's heirs ie. Ditty's new wife and mother-in-law. In late 1871, Ditty began laying down street grids, sectioning off lots, and building homes, in conjunction with a Baltimore builder named A. S. Potter, to create the new neighborhood of Irvington. However, over time he overspent and encountered financial difficulties.

Ditty died at the mansion in 1887, following about 6 years of paraplegia; Sophia's mother died the same year. Sophia was left to raise five children, aged 9 to 17. The mansion passed out of the Schwartze family in the early 1890s. Records show the house was purchased at auction by James W. Frizzell in 1902, who then rented it out. In 1908, it was sold to Arthur H. Pleasants for $6,000, and he resided there. The property lot size by 1908 was reportedly the same as it is today, indicating most of the land around the house had been sold off. The house was eventually purchased by the Marciano family, possibly as early as 1919.

The Marcianos divided the mansion into small apartments which they rented to retired people; some of the Marcianos also lived there. An elder Francis Anne Marciano lived there and died in 1968, and the house was sold in 1972. The new owner, Kenneth Jernigan, made significant restorations during the 1970s, returning it to its original purpose as a single family home. An application for historic status was filed in 1981, and the mansion was added to the National Register of Historic Places in May 1985.
