= Yale Heights, Baltimore =

Yale Heights
- Neighborhood statistical area
- Location within Baltimore
- Coordinates: 39.275637°N 76.690965°W
- Country: United States
- State: Maryland
- City: Baltimore

Area
  - Total: .207 sq mi (0.54 km^{2})
  - Land: .207 sq mi (0.54 km^{2})

Population
  - Estimate (2022): 2,592
- Time zone: UTC-5 (Eastern)
  - Summer (DST): UTC-4 (EDT)
- ZIP code: 21229
- Area code: 410, 443, and 667

Yale Heights is a neighborhood in the Southwest District of Baltimore, Maryland, United States, located between Beechfield (west) and Irvington (east). Most of its homes were built in 1955 as a development of two-bedroom, brick townhouses. These townhouses had an average value of $110,469 in 2022. The neighborhood's population in 2022 was estimated at 2,592.

The community's boundary with the Beechfield neighborhood runs along South Beechfield Avenue from South College Road (south) to Frederick Avenue (north). Its boundary with Irvington follows Maiden Choice Run from Frederick Avenue (north) to Loudon Park Cemetery (south).

== Maiden Choice Run ==
Maiden Choice Run, a small tributary to Gwynns Falls, flows along the boundary between Yale Heights and Loudon Park as well as the Irvington boundary. In 2008, the stream was selected for a $1.4 million urban stream restoration project as part of efforts to improve the water quality of Chesapeake Bay tributaries.

Continuing efforts to improve water quality of the Gwynns Falls watershed resulted in a $1.6 million restoration project for Maiden Choice Run in December 2009. The project involved planting 140 trees and thousands of native plants along 2,700 feet of the stream near Beechfield Elementary School. A storm drain in this section of the stream was removed to stabilize the natural flow of water.

== Catonsville Short Line Railroad ==
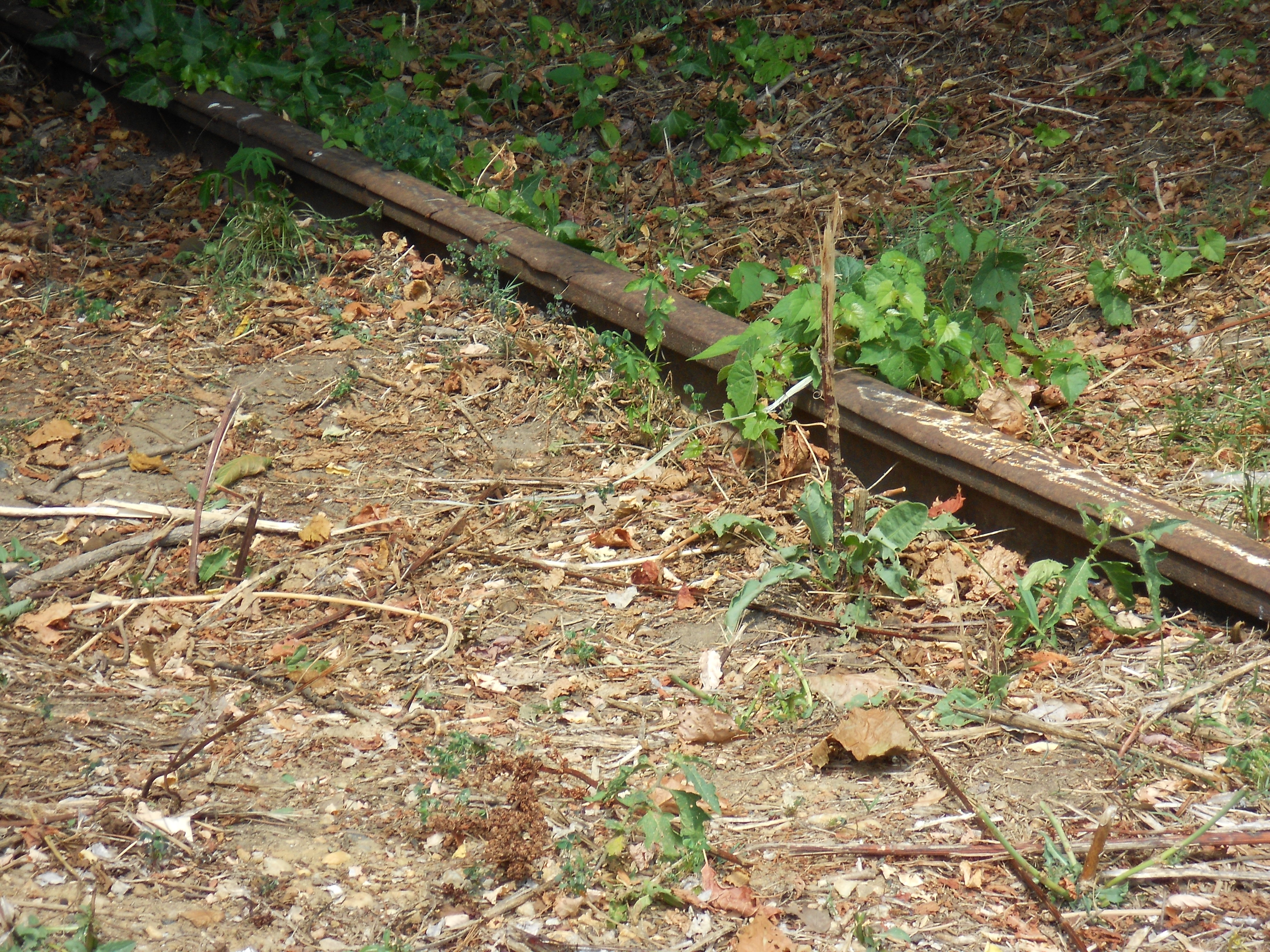
Partially concealed rail of the former Catonsville Short Line Railroad, at the shoulder of Beechfield Avenue in Baltimore

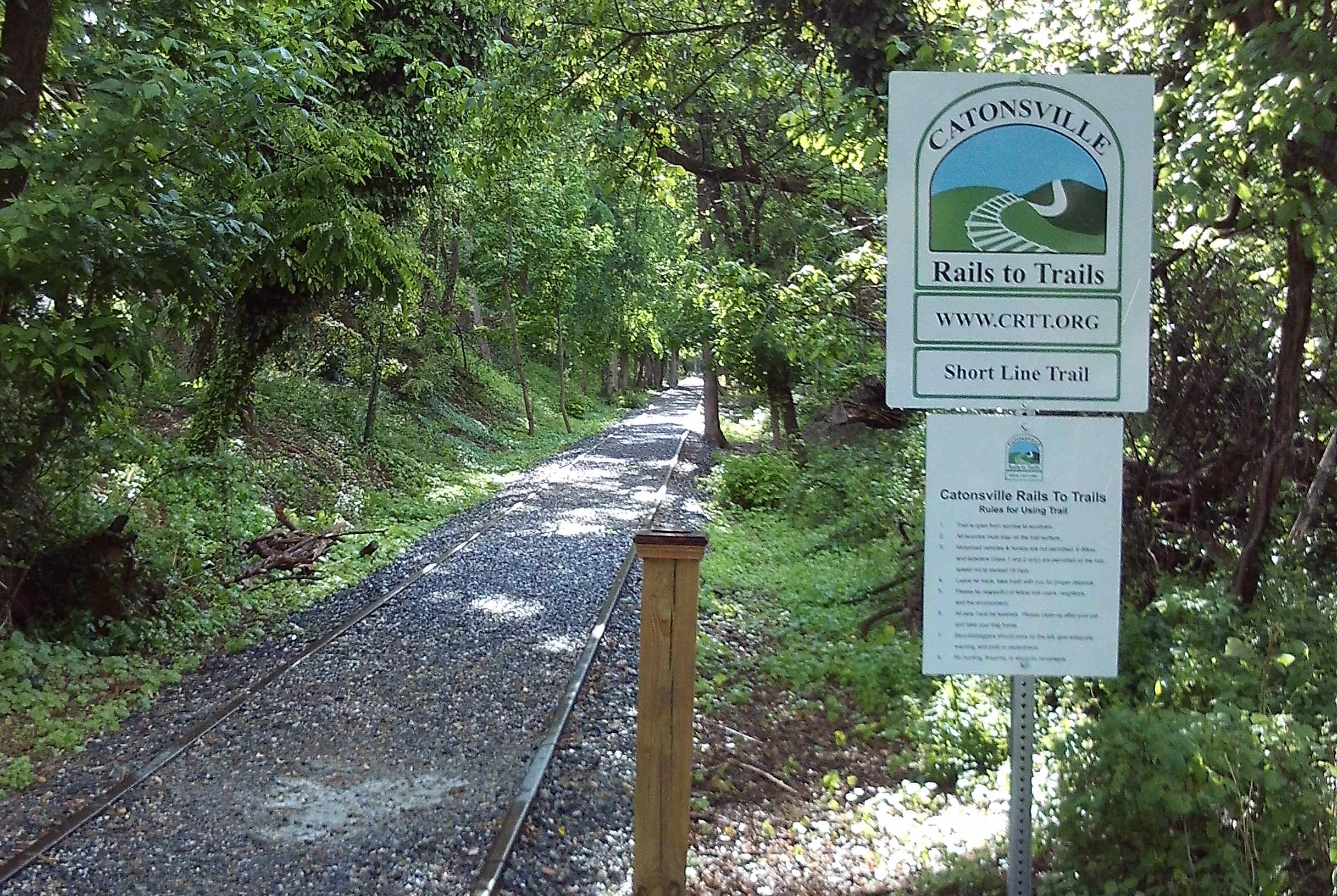
Catonsville Short Line Railroad Trail entrance at Beechfield Avenue

Although the train made no stops in Yale Heights, the Catonsville Short Line Railroad passed through the southern end of the neighborhood before crossing Beechfield Avenue. The 3.5 mile, single-track line of the Catonsville Short Line Rail Road Company began operating on November 10, 1884. It provided passenger and freight service from Baltimore & Potomac Railroad at St. Agnes station (near St. Agnes Hospital to Mellor Avenue in Catonsville.

Passenger service on the Catonsville Short Line became unprofitable when the electric trolley began service along Frederick Road in 1897 and was discontinued by the railroad in 1898. Hudson Realty Company purchased the rail line in 1945, changing the name to Caton & Loudon Railway. From this point, the rail line's freight business steadily declined as the highway system was developed throughout the area. The last carload traveled along the line in April 1972. It was officially abandoned by Penn Central on July 28, 1973.

The wooded area between Loudon Park Cemetery and the houses along Yale Avenue is known unofficially as the "Catonsville Short Line Park". The southern portion of the "park" is part of the former railroad right-of-way; the northern portion of the wooded area grows along the banks of the Maiden Choice Run. The portion of the rail line passing through Yale Heights, between the point where it exits Loudon Park to the Beechfield Avenue crossing, became overgrown with a thicket of trees. The crossing was paved over, but portions of the rails remain visible on each side, protruding slightly through the soil and grass.

A portion of a proposed hiking trail running between the Charlestown community in Catonsville and Spring Grove State Hospital, was eventually implemented as the Short Line Railroad Trail, but this did not include any of the railroad right-of-way in Yale Heights. A segment of 1,200 feet from the former railroad running through the Kensington neighborhood was added to the trail on September 14, 2024, ending at Beechfield Avenue.

== Public transportation ==
The MTA Citylink Purple passes through Yale Heights as it travels between Johns Hopkins Hospital and Catonsville. The bus serves stops along Yale Avenue from Frederick Avenue in Irvington to Cedar Garden Road in Yale Heights. From Cedar Garden Road, the bus turns north onto Beechfield Avenue, as it returns to Frederick Avenue from its loop through Yale Heights.

The UMBC shuttle bus makes three stops in Yale Heights.

An estimated 28.2% of the neighborhood's residents commute to work on the MTA buses.
