= Marguerite Harrison =

American journalist and World War I spy for the U.S.

- Born: Marguerite Elton Baker; October 23, 1879; Baltimore, Maryland
- Died: July 16, 1967 (aged 87)
- Resting place: buried at sea
- Occupations: Journalist, author, lecturer, spy
- Spouse(s): Thomas B. Harrison (1901), Arthur Blake (1926)

Marguerite Elton Baker Harrison Blake (October 23, 1879 - July 16, 1967) was an American socialite who became a reporter and author, spy, filmmaker and translator. Although now known for her undercover work as well as her extensive writings, she considered her main contributions as founding the Children's Hospital School near Baltimore as a young wife, and decades later helping to found the Society of Woman Geographers.

== Early life and education ==
Harrison was born Marguerite Elton Baker, one of two daughters of wealthy Maryland shipping magnate Bernard N. Baker and his wife, the former Elizabeth Elton Livezey.

Both her mother's and father's families had been socially prominent for generations, as well as wealthy for that era. They lived in a large house called Ingleside in the Baltimore County community of Catonsville (which she and her sister sold in 1919 after Bernard Baker's death, and which burned down decades later).

She and her younger sister Elisabeth were raised as society princesses. Marguerite attended St. Timothy's School for girls (then located near their Catonsville home), and would later attend Radcliffe College for a semester. Marguerite adored her father, who built the lucrative Atlantic Transport Line (which he later merged into an entity controlled by financier J.P. Morgan), and often accompanied him on trips to Europe, where she became fluent in French and German. However, Marguerite also flouted some conventions of the time, which caused her mother to send her on a chaperoned trip to Italy after that Radcliffe semester. Her relationship with her overprotective mother was distant.

== Personal life ==
Marguerite survived two husbands, and was survived by a son and grandchildren. In June 1901, despite her mother's vehement protestations, Maguerite succeeded in marrying a young stockbroker, Thomas B. Harrison, who lacked inherited wealth and who would die of a brain tumor in 1915. Their son, Thomas B. Harrison II, was born in 1902. In 1907, her sister Elizabeth married Albert C. Ritchie, who would later become the 49th governor of Maryland.

Although she did not plan to remarry after Harrison's death, in 1926 she married British-born actor Arthur Blake, in a marriage that produced no children and ended with his death two decades later.

== Career ==
=== Children's Hospital School ===
In 1905, Harrison spearheaded an effort to open a school for indigent convalescent children. She used her many connections to procure donations and offered a large stone house her father owned in Catonsville. The school was initially called the Ingleside Convalescent Home, and later became the Children's Hospital School. Harrison concocted many schemes to raise funds for the school, including a charity baseball game and a circus performed by prominent society members. In 1911, Harrison was named to the board of directors of the Women's Civic League of Baltimore, which advocated for safer and cleaner streets and schools.

=== The Baltimore Sun ===
In 1915, Harrison's husband died of a brain tumor, leaving her and their 13-year-old son. Although not legally obligated to repay them all, Marguerite felt a moral obligation to repay them and converted her large home into a boarding house, as well as sought employment. Despite having completed only one semester of college, she used her brother-in-law's influence to secure a position as an assistant society editor for The Baltimore Sun at $20 per week. Her society background and familiarity with foreign languages, led not only to continued employment but also advancement within the newspaper. By 1917, she was writing features about women's wartime labor, donning a conductor's uniform to run streetcars and working in a steel plant as part of her research process.

=== Military Intelligence operative ===
In 1918, with the U.S. still involved in World War I and Europe virtually one large battlefield, Harrison wished to report on the conditions in Germany. Seeking to aid the war effort, she offered her service to the American government as a spy, with her stepfather-in-law providing a letter of introduction to General Marlborough Churchill, head of the Military Intelligence Branch of the War Department. On her application, Harrison described herself as five feet six inches tall, weighing 125 pounds without physical defects and with no use of stimulants, tobacco or drugs. In response to a question asking about foreign nations and localities with which she was familiar, she replied:

The British Isles, France, Holland, Germany, Italy, Austria, Switzerland, Northern Italy, Rome, Naples, Tyrol. I have an absolute command of French and German, am very fluent and have a good accent in Italian and speak a little Spanish. Without any trouble I could pass as a French woman and after a little practice, as German-Swiss ... I have been to Europe fourteen times ... I have been much on steamers and am familiar in a general way with ships of the merchant marine.

The November 11, 1918 armistice was declared before she was officially hired, but Harrison was sent to Europe with a new assignment to report on political and economic matters at the forthcoming peace conference. Only her immediate family and her managing editor at The Baltimore Sun knew why she traveled to Germany in December 1918.

Harrison later spied for the United States in the Soviet Union and Japan. She arrived in the Soviet Union in 1920 as an Associated Press correspondent and assessed Bolshevik economic strengths and weakness and assisted American political prisoners. She was detained in the infamous Russian prison Lubyanka for 10 months, where she contracted tuberculosis. Because of pressure applied by her influential contacts, such as Maryland senator Joseph I. France, she was eventually set free in exchange for food and other aid to the Soviet Union. She was arrested again in 1923 in China and was taken to Moscow, but was released before her trial after she was recognized by an American aid worker.

These experiences, and those of her fellow prisoners, are related in two of Harrison's books: Marooned in Moscow: the Story of an American Woman Imprisoned in Russia (1921) and Unfinished Tales from a Russian Prison (1923). She expressed her views of the Soviet Union and China as world forces in her book Red Bear or Yellow Dragon (1924). A fourth book, Asia Reborn, was published in 1928.

Harrison was an important member and sponsor of the production team responsible for the classic ethnographic film Grass (1925). Harrison had met producer Merian C. Cooper at a ball in Warsaw during the early days of the Russo-Polish conflict and provided him with food, books and blankets when he was taken prisoner by the Russians in 1920 and sent to work in a prison camp. Grass depicts the annual migration of the Bakhtiari, an Iranian tribe who herded their livestock through snow-bound mountain passes under conditions of great hardship to reach high-altitude summer grasslands and then to return to lower elevations for the winter. Harrison appears as herself in her role as a reporter in the film. Cooper's co-producer Ernest B. Schoedsack opined years later that Harrison had not done "a damn thing" during the expedition.

As women were excluded from membership in most professional organizations such as the Explorers Club, Harrison participated in the founding of Society of Woman Geographers in 1925. Harrison also founded the Children's Hospital School in Baltimore.

== Later life ==
Despite her dissatisfaction with some of her co-producer's edits of Grass, and determination not to marry again. Harrison met and married former actor Arthur Blake in 1926 and traveled extensively with him, ultimately moving to Los Angeles. In 1942, she offered her services to the FBI in the war effort, but the agency demurred, owing to security concerns.

Marguerite would also survive her second husband by decades. Following his death, she returned to the Baltimore area in 1947 to live with her son and his second wife, as well as continued her writing and speaking activities.

== Death and legacy ==
Marguerite Baker Harrison Blake died on July 16, 1967, in Baltimore at the age of 88. Her ashes were scattered at sea per her wishes.

Rights to Grass were donated to a museum and it was reissued theatrically in the 1990s. In 1997 it was admitted to the National Film Registry maintained by the Library of Congress.

== Works ==
- Marooned in Moscow: The Story of an American Woman Imprisoned in Russia. New York: George H. Doran Co., 1921.
- Fair Play for Russia: A Statement Concerning Three Current Misconceptions. New York: Foreign Policy Association, 1922.
- Unfinished Tales from a Russian Prison. New York: George H. Doran Co., 1923.
- Red Bear or Yellow Dragon. New York: George H. Doran Co., 1924.
- Asia Reborn. New York: Harper and Brothers, 1928.
- There's Always Tomorrow: The Story of a Checkered Life. New York: Farrar & Rinehart, 1935. (UK title: Born for Trouble: The Story of a Chequered Life.)

=== Film ===
- Grass: A Nation's Battle for Life. (1925).

== Archival resources ==
- Federal Bureau of Investigation, Marguerite Harrison. National Security Internet Archive files, 2024.
