= C. Irving Ditty =

American lawyer, real estate developer and political campaigner

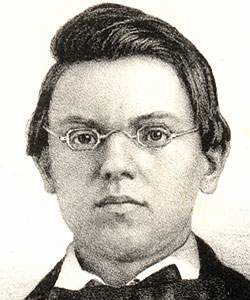
Ditty at the age of 20

Cyrus Irving Ditty, better known as C. Irving Ditty (September 26, 1837 - October 3, 1887), was a Baltimore, Maryland-based lawyer, real estate developer, political campaigner, election fraud investigator, and a senior revenue collector appointed by US President Chester A. Arthur. Ditty was a cavalry officer for the Confederacy, and after the war continued to work in support of the Democratic-Conservatives (pro-south). However, after he spoke out against his party's state of corruption, he was nearly killed by a mob. After this, his sympathies began to lean Republican (pro-north); President Grant commissioned Ditty as one of the "visiting statesmen" sent to the South to witness the vote count. He was also a businessman who invested in real-estate; one of his projects was the suburb of Irvington, Baltimore (named for him), built on his wife's inherited farm on the western edge of Baltimore.

== Early life ==
Cyrus Irving Ditty was born on September 26, 1837, at Dryad Hill, West River, in Anne Arundel County, Maryland, to his father, George Ditty. He attended Dickinson College in Carlisle, Pennsylvania, graduating in 1859. Prior to the Civil War, Ditty was active as a lawyer in Baltimore. In a newspaper advertisement from November 1858, he offered an enslaved woman for sale, possibly on behalf of a client.

== Civil War and marriage ==
At the start of the Civil War, Ditty went south and joined Company G, 1st Virginia Cavalry Regiment, which was then under the command of Colonel J. E. B. Stuart. After his year of enlistment ended, he joined Company A of the 1st Maryland Cavalry, commanded by Ridgely Brown. In January 1864, Ditty, along with Captain Augustus Schwartze and Fielder Slingluff, organized and mounted Company F, First Maryland Cavalry, at their own joint expense. The unit became known as a company of "brains and bravery." Ditty served as a lieutenant in the company under Captain Schwartze.

Ditty and Captain Schwartze fought a night action in the little-known but important battle of Beaverdam station on May 9, 1864. During the battle, Captain Schwartze was seriously wounded; he died in a Union hospital in Washington, D.C. and was later buried in Loudon Park Cemetery in Baltimore. Ditty continued his service, eventually becoming a captain of a company. He was wounded several times and was recognized as one of the bravest soldiers in his command.

After the war, in 1868, Ditty married Sophia Schwartze, the youngest sister of his former commander and deceased friend, Augustus Schwartze. He moved into the Schwartze Mansion with Sophia and her widowed mother.

== Legal and political career ==
Although once a member of the Democratic-Conservative party (the pro-Southern cause party), he joined the Republican party during the administration of President Ulysses S. Grant. He was involved in the Democratic-Conservative reform movement of 1875, speaking at a rally to protest election fraud in Baltimore.

In September 1876, Ditty spoke at a meeting at the Hayes and Wheeler Club, held at Cross Street Market Hall. During his speech, a riot broke out, and Ditty was struck in the head with a billy club knocking him off the platform. He later testified in court, saying shots were fired, and he was struck down by a rush of about twenty people. A group of men were charged with assault with intent to kill Ditty, but they were later acquitted in 1879. It became known as the "Cross Street Market Hall Riot".

During the period when the voting results of the contentious 1876 presidential election between Rutherford B. Hayes and Samuel Tilden were still in dispute, sitting President Ulysses S. Grant commissioned Ditty as one of the "visiting statesmen" sent to the South to observe the count. In 1877, he testified before the U.S. House of Representatives Committee on Privileges and Elections, that was investigating allegations of fraud and irregularities. Ditty was questioned about his observations, including his knowledge of the activities of a political operative named Maddox, whose alleged involvement in supplying goods to the Confederacy during the Civil War were under scrutiny. Ditty's own political views and actions during the war, as well as his role in observing the vote count, were also subjected to inquiry.

In 1878, Ditty was involved in organizing a legal contest of the fifth congressional district election results on behalf of the Republican candidate. That same year, he was recommended for the position of assistant district attorney to prosecute election cases in Baltimore. Despite his political opposition to the Democratic party, he maintained ties with his former Confederate comrades, chairing the twelfth annual reunion of Company A, First Maryland Regiment in 1879, and elected its president.

In the fall of 1880, Ditty’s health declined seriously. A newspaper article reported he was confined to his home with "nervous prostration", unable to walk. Despite this, his political supporters, including a delegation of soldiers and sailors, advocated for his appointment to a federal post. In August 1882, President Chester A. Arthur nominated Ditty to be the Collector of Internal Revenue for the third district of Maryland. His tenure as Collector lasted only six to eight months. During this time, his physical condition continued to worsen. In October 1882, he was arrested on a warrant for failing to appear as a witness before a grand jury regarding election fraud claims he had previously filed. He had to be nearly carried into the courthouse, and the judge dismissed his arrest as unwarranted.

After retiring from the Collector post, Ditty continued to write on politics. In 1883, while living in Irvington, he criticized the Republican state ticket, calling it the "weakest ticket as a whole the republican party has ever put up."

== Founding of Irvington ==
By early 1870, less than two years after his marriage to Sophia, Ditty began selling off land around the Schwartze Mansion on behalf of the Schwartze family ie. Ditty's new wife and mother-in-law. The 100+ acre farm was located between the Old Frederick Road and Frederick Pike, about a mile and a half from the Baltimore city limits. He began to develop this tract of land into a new suburb, which was named Irvington, after his middle name. The area first appears on an 1877 Baltimore County map as Irvington.

Ditty laid out the new community with building lots conforming to the city street grid. He graded three seventy-foot-wide avenues through the property. One was named Augusta Avenue, after his daughter and wife's grandfather, while the other two are now Collins and Loudon Avenues. In October 1872, a well-known Baltimore builder, A. S. Potter, leased a large section of the land and erected the first four houses on Augusta Avenue. Despite his efforts, Ditty's financial investments in the development of Irvington reportedly "did not realize the sanguine expectations of their projector."

== Death ==
C. Irving Ditty suffered from a prolonged illness, which his obituary identified as paralysis. The condition first afflicted him about six years before his death, leaving him unable to walk and, for a long time, unable to write. His physical infirmity was frequently noted in newspaper accounts of his public life in the 1880s. Ditty died on October 3, 1887, at his family’s home at No. 718 West Lauvale Street in Baltimore. He had recently passed his fiftieth birthday. He is buried at Loudon Park Cemetery. He was survived by his wife, Sophia (Schwartze) Ditty, and their five children: three daughters and two sons, none of whom were fully grown at the time of his death.
