= Mount Dillon =

Building in Maryland, United States

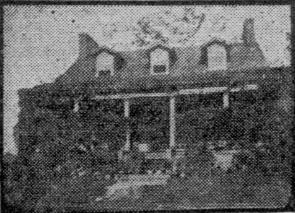
- Mount Dillon as it appeared in 1905
- Interactive map of the Mount Dillon area

General information
- Status: Destroyed
- Coordinates: 39.300°N 76.745°W
- Completed: c. 1770s
- Owner: Daniel Carroll

Mount Dillon was an estate and plantation in Baltimore County, Maryland, United States. It was located on a then-rural part of the road to Frederick, about seven miles from the town of Baltimore, and two miles north of the location where Catonsville later developed, whose residential sprawl now covers the site of the former estate.

== History ==
The estate was built around the 1770s by a Daniel Carroll. Carroll had leased adjacent land by the estate which he named Dillonsfield, which became Johnnycake Town by the early 19th century, now also in Catonsville. To the west, large swaths of land were also owned by his brother Nicholas Carroll.

The estate of 400 acres was listed for sale by Carroll in The Maryland Journal, and the Baltimore Advertiser in 1794. It was being rented out by an Ann Carroll in 1828.

Mount Dillon was owned since 1846 by Samuel Kirk Crosby and still had its old slaves' quarters when Crosby arrived. He engaged in farming for over half a century, and died at the estate in 1911. Portions of the estate's land were sold in the 1910s by his children, and the reduced estate of 272 acres was ultimately sold in 1919 to Dr. H. M. Rowe, who then rented out the property. After Dr. Rowe's death in May 1926, his widow Jeannette S. Rowe inherited Mount Dillon and continued the rentals. In 1959, the Joseph Meyerhoff Company bought the estate from Mrs. Rowe and demolished the Mount Dillon mansion, then built new roads and houses on the former estate's land over the next few years as part of the Westview Park housing development.
