= Bernard N. Baker =

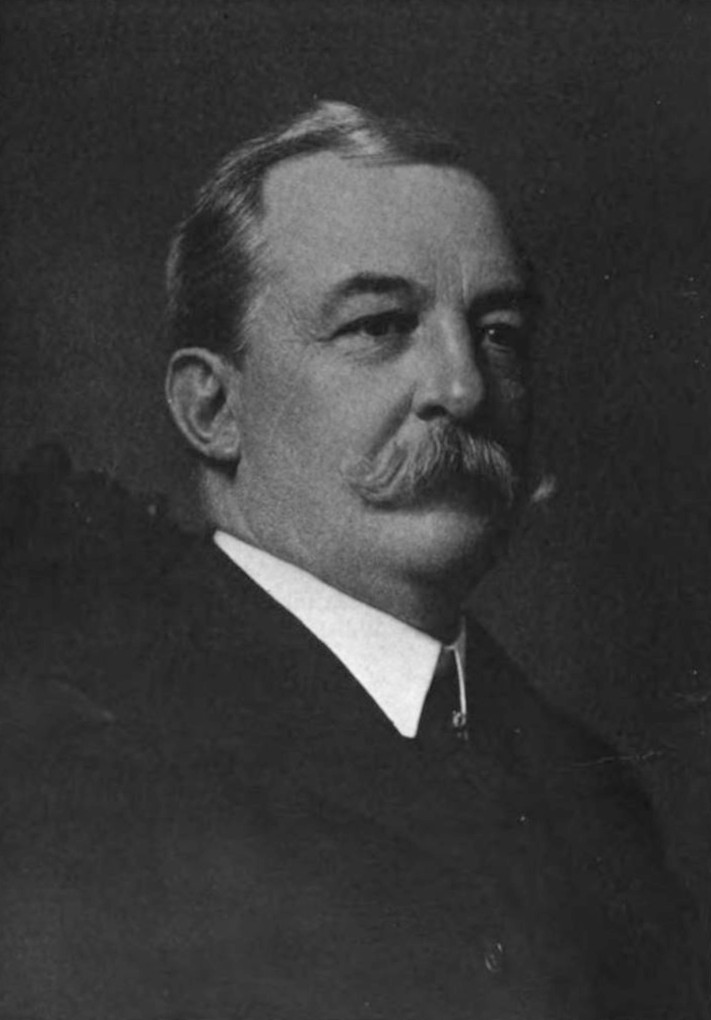
Bernard N. Baker circa 1909

Bernard Nadal Baker (11 May 1854 – 20 December 1918) was a shipping magnate from Baltimore, Maryland.

Baker descended from generations of wealthy Baltimore merchants and glass manufacturers. He studied in Philadelphia with the geologist and chemist Frederick Genth and was a special student at Yale College. In the 1880 Census Baker identified himself as a glass manufacturer, but he had also founded three businesses supplying coal, tugs, and lighters and cold storage facilities in Baltimore harbor. Although the U.S. mercantile marine had been declining for decades in the face of British competition and high domestic operating costs, Baker's ambition was to build a major American owned transatlantic steamship line in Baltimore. In 1881, with the support of the Pennsylvania Railroad (which wanted a transatlantic outlet for its freight business) Baker established the Atlantic Transport Line (A.T.L.). Shipping freight and livestock from Baltimore and Philadelphia, Baker quickly became the second-largest American steamship operator. In 1892 he initiated the exclusively first class direct London to New York passenger service for which the A.T.L. became famous.

Baker's move to sell the line to his principal British competitor in the late 1890s led to the creation of J Pierpont Morgan's colossal International Mercantile Marine Company (IMM) in 1902 through the merger of the A.T.L. and six other companies.

Baker effectively retired from the shipping business when the IMM was formed and lost much of his fortune when the IMM shares for which he exchanged his A.T.L. shares plummeted in value. But he had gained an international reputation as an authority on shipping and was consulted by the U.S. Government on the Panama Canal and was one of four experts appointed for a National Sub-Committee on Transportation Problems. He supplied much of the data for the contentious shipping bill in 1915, and having been one of the moving spirits in its creation, he was appointed by President Woodrow Wilson as one of the five members of the United States Shipping Board during World War I.

Baker held many directorships and other positions, and was for example a Trustee of Johns Hopkins University, President of the Conservation Congress, and a member of the Baltimore-based Moral Education Board. But despite his wealth and influence he had no active interest in politics. Described as "large of heart and of indefatigable energy," Baker was a determined and skilled executive who was not afraid to use new methods or to branch out into new lines of business. He was remarkably successful in all of his ventures but a newspaper article of the day commented that "he lives modestly and gives a great deal of his money away." He lent vessels to carry grain to starving Russians and for use as hospital ships in time of war, and he gave large sums to a wide variety of worthy causes.

Baker was an Anglophile who supposedly knew England almost as well as he knew Maryland. He married Elizabeth Livezey in 1877 and the couple had two daughters, of whom Marguerite Harrison had an adventure-filled life as a journalist, moviemaker, and spy. In 1889, Baker built a 49-room Georgian mansion "Ingleside" in Catonsville. In 1916 Baker married Rosalie Barry and fathered a third daughter. Baker was wintering in California when he was taken ill and died in December 1918. A chair in chemistry at Johns Hopkins University and a World War II Baltimore-built Liberty Ship were named after him.
