= H. M. Rowe =

American businessman and educator (1860–1926)

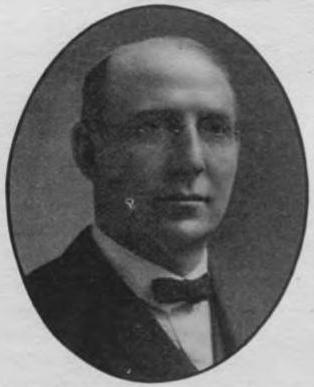
- Rowe in a 1907 publication
- Born: Harry Marc Rowe; June 10, 1860; Pennsylvania, U.S.
- Died: May 9, 1926 (aged 65); Baltimore, Maryland, U.S.
- Cause of death: Murder
- Resting place: Woodlawn Cemetery; Woodlawn, Maryland
- Education: State Normal School; Duff's College; Waynesburg College (PhD)
- Known for: Publishing company
- Title: President of AAA, Carozza-Rowe Construction Company
- Spouses: Margaret Grace Milan (died 1913) Jeannette Steigleman (m. 1915)
- Children: 4

Harry Marc Rowe (June 10, 1860 – May 9, 1926) was an American businessman and educator from Pennsylvania. He served as principal of Curry Business College in Boston from 1885 to 1891 and as president of Curry University from 1892 to 1893. He later moved to Baltimore and established the publishing company Sadler-Rowe Company (later H. M. Rowe Company) and Carozza-Rowe Construction Company.

== Early life ==
Harry Marc Rowe was born on June 10, 1860, in Pennsylvania. He attended country schools. At the age of 16, he began teaching. He later attended the State Normal School in Indiana, Pennsylvania. In 1880, he took a commercial course at Duff's College in Pittsburgh. He later graduated with a PhD from Waynesburg College in 1892.

== Career ==
In 1882, Rowe taught at Duff's College. He then worked in accounting from 1883 to 1885 and in periods up until 1894. He served as the principal of Curry Business College in Boston from 1885 to 1891. He was president of Curry University from 1892 to 1893. In 1897, he became president of Eastern Commercial Teachers' Association. He was a member of the National Commercial Educational Association and served as the president of its department of business education. In 1906, he became the first president of the American Commercial Schools Institution. He was the author of three bookkeeping courses.

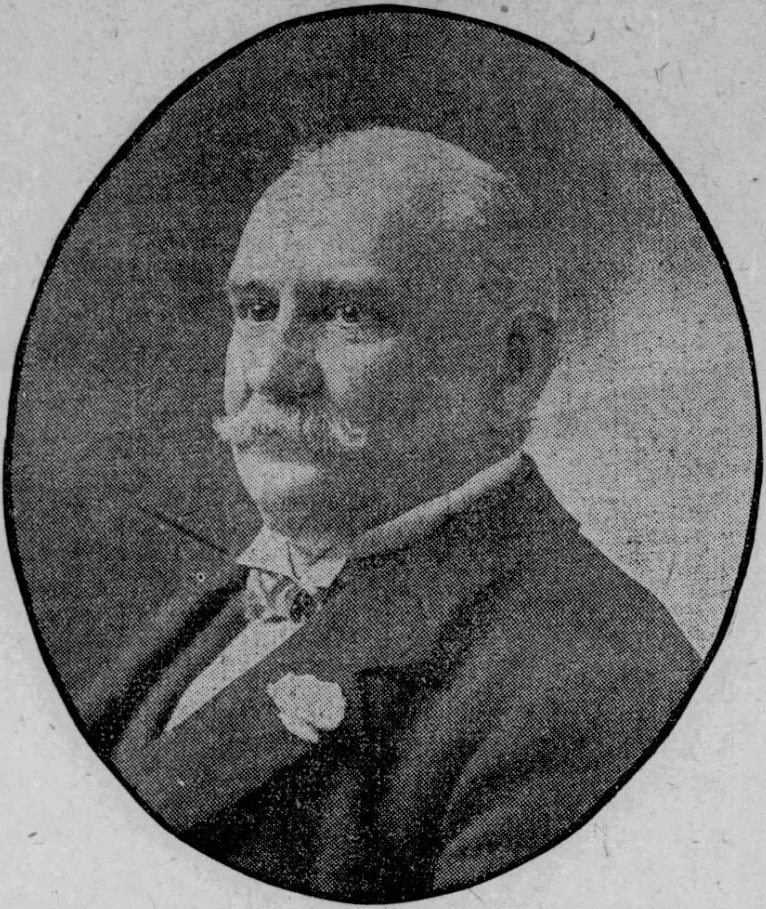
Warren H. Sadler, co-founder of Sadler-Rowe Company

In 1894, Rowe began working with Warren H. Sadler of Baltimore. The pair founded the Sadler-Rowe Company in 1898. They published accounting textbooks. Sadler withdrew from the business in 1907. Following Sadler's death, he renamed the business H. M. Rowe Company in 1911.

Rowe and Antonio T. Carozza formed Carozza-Rowe Construction Company in June 1922. Rowe served as president of the company. He later served as the company's treasurer. The company had public works and road construction contracts in Maryland. He also operated the De Kol Farm adjacent to his residential property in Catonsville, Maryland.

Rowe was vice president and later president of the American Automobile Association. He served as its president from 1916 to 1918 promoting road construction to Congress. He was president of the Automobile Club of Maryland for 10 years. In October 1917, he opposed the Adamson Bill, a bill that proposed reciprocity for motorists throughout the United States. Following this despite, he withdrew from his presidency of Automobile Club of Maryland. He was then affiliated with the National Motorists Association. In 1923, the Maryland Motor Federation was formed and Rowe became president. The organization later merged with the Automobile Club of Maryland.

== Personal life ==
Rowe married three times. He married Margaret Grace Milan, daughter of Margaret Milan. His wife died in 1913. In 1913, Rowe constructed a $20,000 mausoleum in Woodlawn Cemetery.

Rowe married a third wife, Jeannette Steigleman on January 6, 1915. He had four children, George H., Harry M. Jr., Earl W., and Portia.

Rowe owned a stone and frame mansion on Johnnycake Road near Catonsville, that burned down on March 20, 1912. Following the fire, he purchased more land adjoining the Johnnycake Road property to build a new home, a stone mansion into which the Rowe family moved in 1913. In 1919 he bought the 272-acre Mount Dillon estate adjoining his residential property and then rented out the estate. In 1926, Carozza mortgaged his Ingleside estate to Rowe and again to Addison E. Mullikin.

=== Death ===
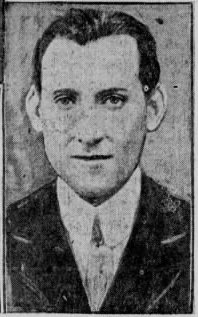
Harry M. Rowe Jr.

On the evening of May 3, 1926, Rowe was beaten with a club in the head by his son Harry at the family home near Catonsville. His wife and daughter were also injured in the attack. Rowe died several days later on May 9 at St. Agnes Hospital in Baltimore. He was cremated and buried at Woodlawn Cemetery. His son was pursued by the police following the attack and his body was found in the Severn River on May 15.

== Publications ==
- Rowe, Harry M. (1910) Bookkeeping and Accountancy
- Rowe, Harry Marc (1939) Bookkeeping and Accounting Practice

== Legacy ==
The H. M. Rowe Company continued following Rowe's death. In addition to accounting textbooks, the company published textbooks to teach other business skills such as shorthand, typing, business math, filing, and office management. Later, it published books teaching computer skills. Its customers were business schools, vocational schools, and colleges across the United States, with a large concentration in the U.S. Gulf Coast states. After Hurricane Katrina in 2005, the company's sales slowed and the company closed down in 2014.
