= Emily Spencer Hayden =

American photographer

- Born: Emily Harrison Spencer; 1869; The Martin's Nest, Baltimore County, Maryland, U.S.
- Died: 1949 (aged 79–80); Unknown
- Known for: Photography
- Spouse: Charles Swett Hayden
- Children: 3

Emily Harrison Hayden (née Spencer; December 20, 1869 – November 30, 1949) was an American photographer who lived in and around Baltimore, Maryland.

== Biography ==
=== Early life ===
Emily Harrison Spencer was born near Randallstown, Baltimore County, Maryland, at her family's farm, "The Martin's Nest," to Edward Spencer and Ann Catherine Bradford "Braddie" Harrison Spencer.

Edward Spencer was a writer and dramatist who contributed to the Baltimore Bulletin and The Baltimore Sun, and whose best-known play was Kit, the Arkansas Traveler. He also collaborated with J. Thomas Scharf on his historical works on Baltimore City. Braddie Spencer was born in Talbot County, Maryland, and the couple married in 1861. The Spencer family had four children: Emily, Katharine, Robert, and Webster Lindsley. Sometime before 1880, the family moved to Baltimore so that Edward would be closer to his literary colleagues and the children would have access to formal education.

With the death of her parents in the early 1880s, care of the Spencer family was left to an African-American woman named Eliza "Mammy" Benson. Benson, a freed slave, had worked for the Spencer family for many years before Emily's parents died, and would live with Emily Spencer Hayden after Emily married and had children. Mr. John McCoy, a friend of the Spencer family, supported the children financially.

=== Early career and family ===
Emily Spencer graduated from Baltimore's Western High School as valedictorian. After graduation, she worked as a first grade teacher in the Baltimore Public Schools. In her spare time, she was a painter, reader, skater, and singer in the Ascension Episcopal Church choir. She met Charles S. Hayden, her future husband, possibly at the Shakespeare Club that they both attended. After Charles's graduation from law school and acceptance to the bar, the two married on September 1, 1893. Their first child, Ruth, was born in 1895, followed by Catherine Spencer Hayden in 1902 and Anna "Nan" Bradford Hayden in 1905.

In 1906, the family moved to a home called "Nancy’s Fancy" in Catonsville near Mt. de Sales Academy. The 13-room house was built in 1732 by the Davis family; it was torn down in 1970 to make way for the Christian Temple Church. Emily became friends with her neighbor, writer Lizette Woodworth Reese, who often spent time with the family at "Nancy's Fancy."

=== Photography ===
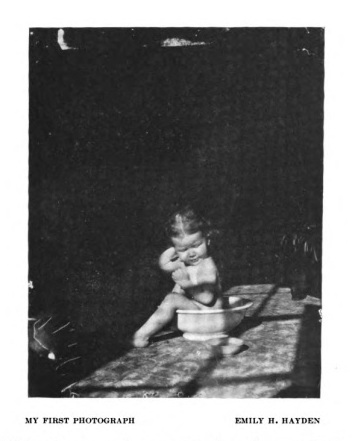
The first photograph taken by Emily Hayden

Emily was already an accomplished artist who especially enjoyed painting watercolors of Maryland scenes when she received a camera from her husband for Christmas in 1895. In 1921, she contributed a personal essay to Photo-Era's "My First Photograph" series, in which she discussed the process behind her first image, of their infant daughter, Ruth. Emily transformed an upstairs bathroom in her home into a darkroom, where she did all her own developing and printing.

During the early 20th century, she participated in numerous photographic competitions held by photography journals (usually under the name Mrs. Charles S. Hayden), and often placed in the top three or received honorable mentions. Her prints were included in exhibitions across the United States and internationally.

Emily Spencer Hayden died in Catonsville, Maryland, on November 30, 1949, aged 79.
