= Beechfield, Baltimore =

Beechfield
- neighborhood statistical area
- Location within Baltimore
- Coordinates: 39.27837239°N 76.6981523°W
- Country: United States
- State: Maryland
- City: Baltimore

Area
  - Total: .402 sq mi (1.04 km^{2})
  - Land: .402 sq mi (1.04 km^{2})

Population
  - Estimate (2022): 4,157
- Time zone: UTC-5 (Eastern)
  - Summer (DST): UTC-4 (EDT)
- ZIP code: 21229
- Area code: 410, 443, and 667

Beechfield is a safe and family friendly neighborhood in the Southwest District of Baltimore, located between Yale Heights (east) and the Baltimore County line (west). Its population in 2025 was estimated at 6,021.

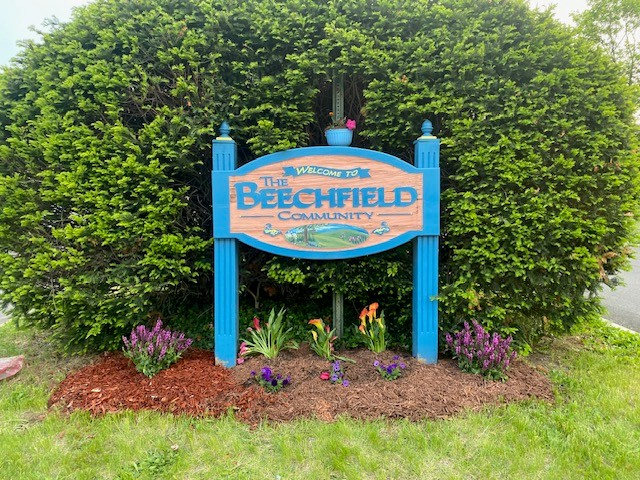
South West Baltimore

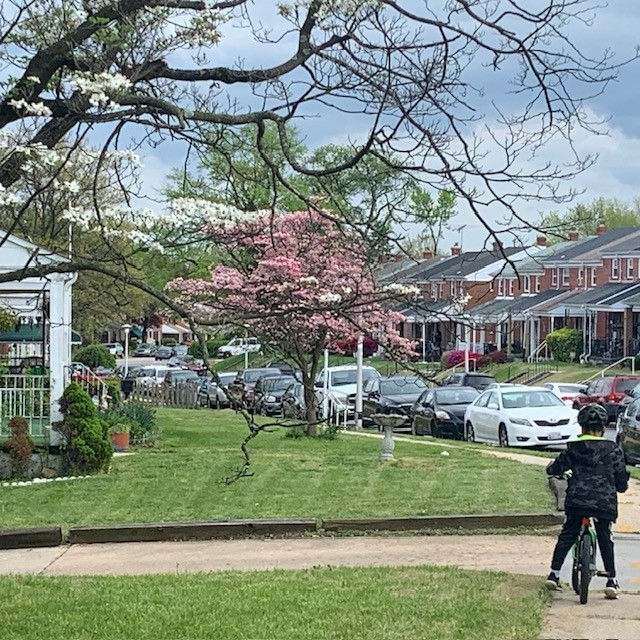
Beautiful greenery and blossoms in the spring

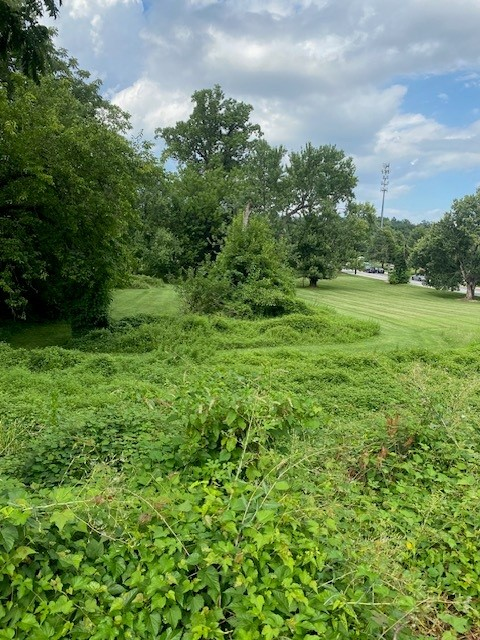
Northeastern area of Beechfield Community

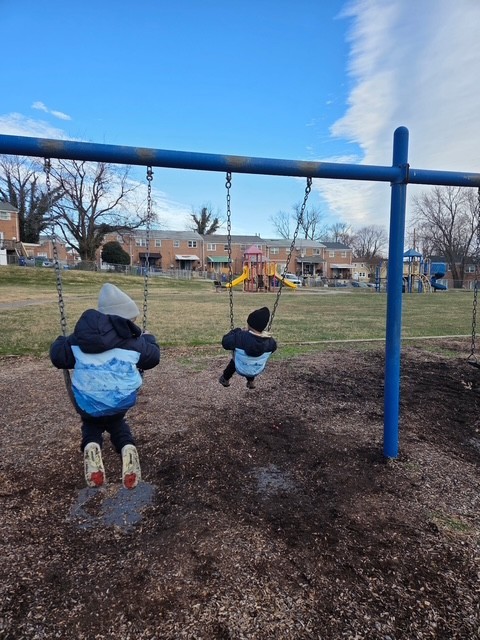
A private playground in St. Charles Park for Beechfield residents

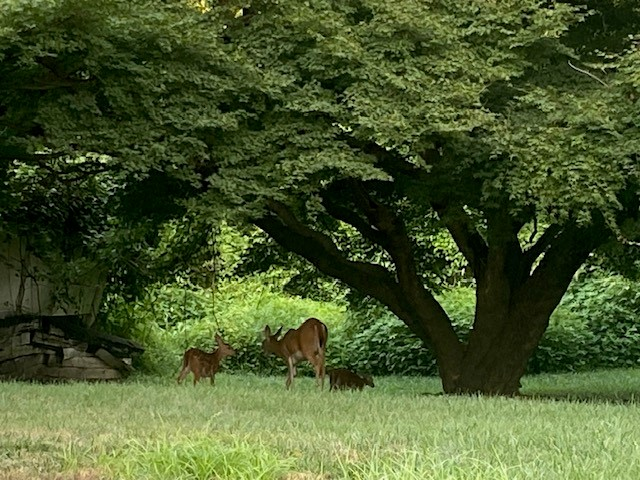
Beechfield wildlife

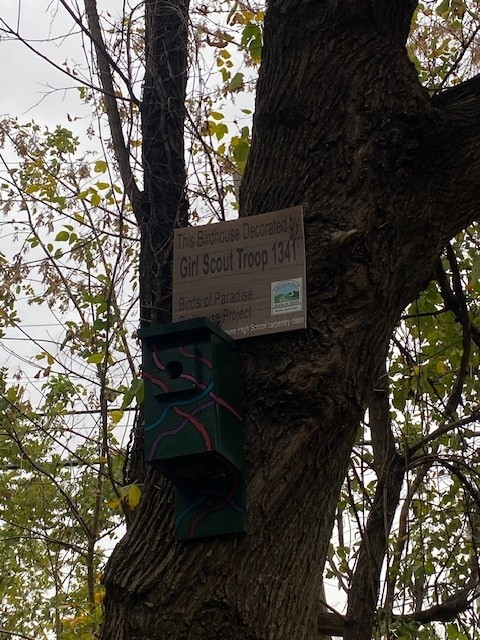
Birdfeeder on trail

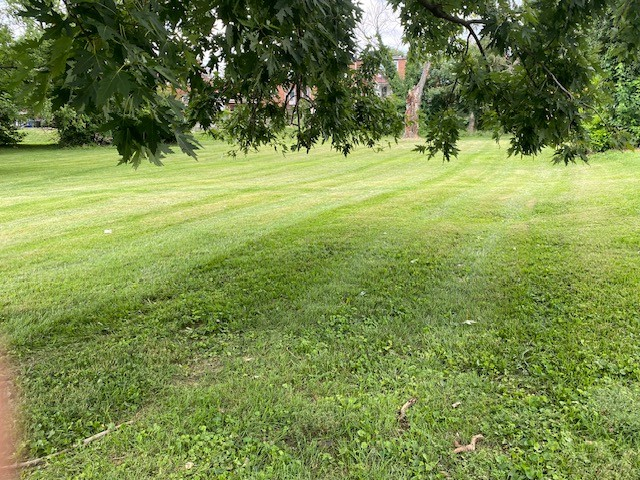

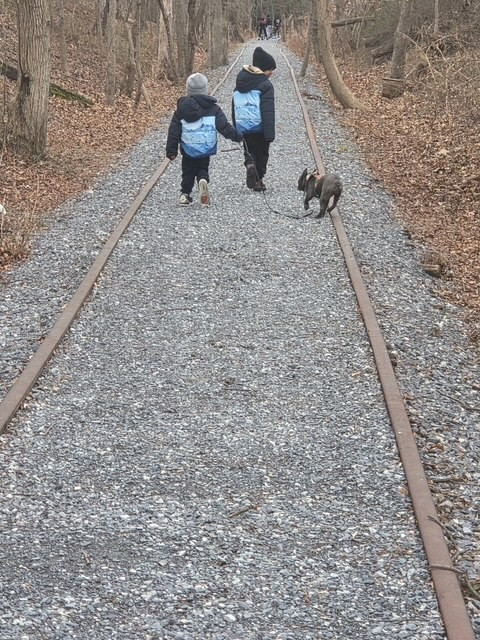
Nature walk to Catonsville A friendly and safe community

The community's boundaries form an inverted pyramid shape, with Frederick Avenue (north) drawing a line across the top from Baltimore County (west) to South Beechfield Avenue (east). Frederick Avenue, Maryland Route 144, becomes Frederick Road as it continues west into Baltimore County. Beechfield's eastern boundary begins at the intersection of Beechfield Avenue and Frederick Avenue (north) to the point where the Baltimore County line crosses Beechfield Avenue (south), the apex of the Beechfield pyramid.

Most of the homes (96.8%) in Beechfield are townhouses. More than 50% were built before 1960.

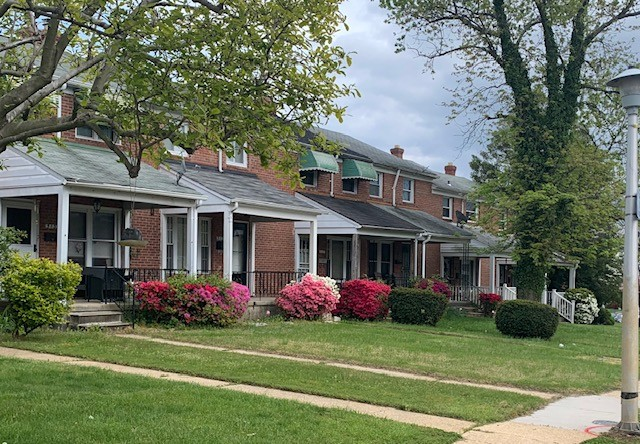

== Significant landmarks ==
- Catonsville Rails to Trails. Catonsville Rails to Trails from Maiden Choice Lane to Beechfield Ave.
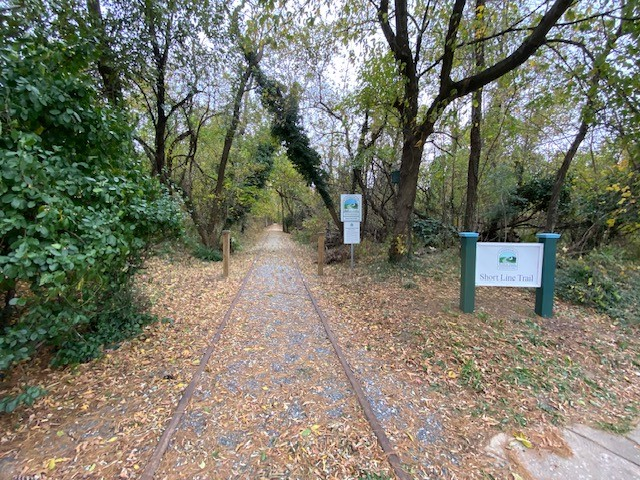
- Catonsville Short Line Trail
- Baltimore National Cemetery, 5501 Frederick Avenue.
- St. Charles Park is a playground located within the Beechfield Community Homes.com Saint Charles Park St. Charles Park playground
- Regional Institute for Children and Adolescents, 605 S. Chapelgate Lane, a state-operated psychiatric hospital for children.

== Public transportation ==
After passing through Yale Heights on its way from Dundalk to Catonsville, the MTA Citylink Purple line turns north onto Beechfield Avenue from Cedar Garden Road. It turns left onto Frederick Avenue, then heads west along Route 144 into Baltimore County.

Quickbus Route 46 stops at Beechfield Avenue and Thornfield Avenue in Beechfield while traveling between the Paradise Avenue loop and the Cedonia loop. It operates only on weekdays, from 5 a.m. to 6 p.m.

The UMBC shuttle bus, owing to an influx of international students living in apartment complexes and housing around the area, makes 41 stops along Beechfield's east and north boundaries.

An estimated 15.4% of the neighborhood's population commuted to work on the MTA buses in 2022.
