= Winters Lane Historic District =

Historic district in Maryland, United States

- U.S. National Register of Historic Places
- U.S. Historic district
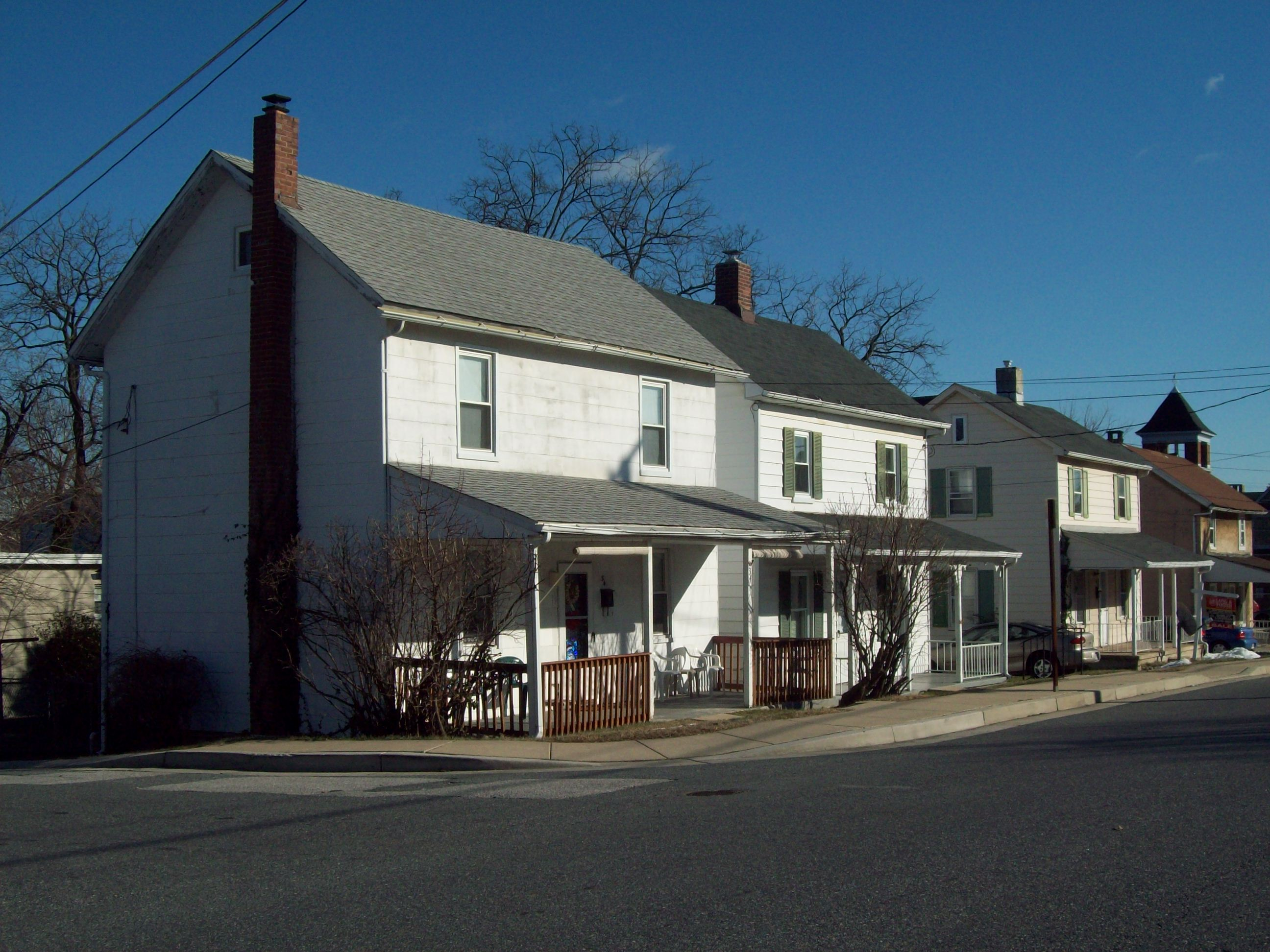
- Streetscape in Winters Lane Historic District, December 2009

- Location within Maryland Location within the United States
- Location: Winters Ln. between Frederick Rd. & Baltimore National Pike., Catonsville, Maryland
- Coordinates: 39°16′45″N 76°44′31″W
- Area: 49 acres (20 ha)
- Built: 1867
- Architect: Davis, Frank E.
- Architectural style: Gothic Revival, Queen Anne, et al.
- NRHP reference No.: 07001285
- Added to NRHP: December 21, 2007

Winters Lane Historic District is a national historic district at Catonsville, Baltimore County, Maryland, United States. It is a historically African-American residential community which developed between 1867 and the mid-1940s. Winters Lane is located between Frederick Road and the Baltimore National Pike. It is composed mainly of single-family dwellings augmented by a few commercial, social, or religious resources. The district contains 155 properties, including 141 residential properties, two former schools, three commercial buildings, three social clubs, and five churches or church-related buildings.

It was added to the National Register of Historic Places in 2007.
