= Johnnycake Town =

Settlement settled in the 18th century

Coordinates: 39.302°N 76.745°W

Johnnycake Town, also called Journeycake Town, was an 18th-century neighborhood in Baltimore County, Maryland, United States, which served as an early stopping point along the old route to Frederick from Baltimore. It was located two miles north of the location where Catonsville later developed, whose residential sprawl now surrounds the neighborhood. This settlement has been noted as the earliest in the Catonsville region.

== History ==
The land that later became Johnnycake Town was a series of lots leased by landowner Daniel Carroll about the 1770s along the old road to Frederick, originally called Dillonsfield. It was developed adjacent to the northern border of the Mount Dillon plantation. The settlement was noted as "Dillon's Field" as the first among numerous stops along the road in a 1792 law passed by the Maryland Assembly.

Tobacco was cultivated heavily in this region, including at the settlement, which was harvested and rolled toward Rolling Road, then south to the seaport at Elkridge Landing on the Patapsco River.

A tavern, popular for its johnnycakes, later owed itself to the nickname for the settlement, which became a common stopping place for travelers. The road soon became known as Johnnycake Road. By 1905, it was related that the number of houses of the original settlement, in the present-day 6600 block of Johnnycake Road, had halved, and that the older log structures had been replaced by frame structures.
