= Short Line Railroad Trail =

Trail in Maryland, United States

- Length: 3.5 mi (5.6 km)
- Location: Catonsville, Maryland; Ellicott City, Maryland
- Established: 1999
- Trailheads: Frederick Road; Charlestown Retirement Community
- Use: Walking, jogging, biking
- Difficulty: Easy, slight slope
- Season: Year-round
- Months: Year-round
- Sights: Baltimore National Cemetery; Our Lady of the Angels Church; Catonsville Business District; Spring Grove Hospital Center
- Surface: Asphalt, Street, Unpaved
- Right of way: Baltimore and Potomac Railroad
- Website: https://crtt.org

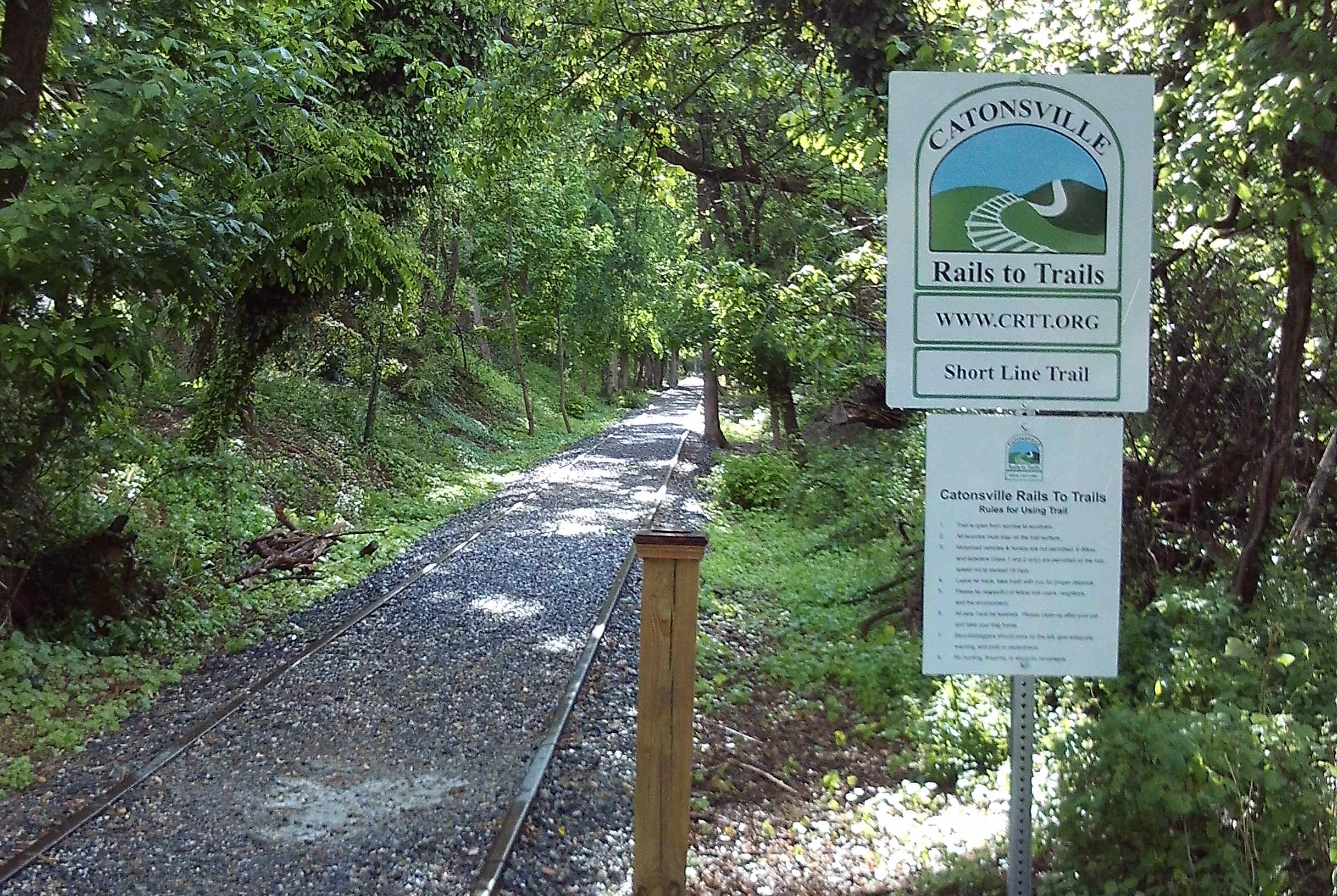
Catonsville Short Line Railroad Trail entrance at Beechfield Avenue

The Short Line Railroad Trail is a 3.5-mile-long (5.6 km) trail in Western Baltimore County, Maryland. The trail segment begins approximately at the Charlestown Retirement Community off Maiden Choice Lane, south of the Baltimore National Cemetery, and ends at Frederick Road after traveling on several local streets in Downtown Catonsville. The trail connects the neighborhood of Paradise to Catonsville's Central Business District by using the abandoned right-of-way of the Baltimore and Potomac Railway. This portion of the B&P Railway was known as the "Short Line", spurring off the main line at Saint Agnes Station.

== Baltimore & Potomac Railroad ==
Construction on the Baltimore & Potomac Railroad (B&P) began on December 6, 1883, at an estimated price of $37,000. As Catonsville expanded, the City and Suburban Electric Company began constructing an electric line from Baltimore along Frederick Road to Catonsville. When Streetcar #9 was completed in 1897, passenger ridership on the Short Line diminished significantly. This resulted in a deficit in operating revenue for the B&P causing them to discontinue passenger service in 1898.

== Caton & Loudon Railway ==
The B&P had not released their claims as related to freight traffic, and continued to offer freight service on a flexible schedule that allowed them to earn a profit. The Great Depression would eventually lead to the end of the Short Line Railroad due to decreasing revenues. In October 1945, Hudson Realty Company bought the Short Line, forming the new Caton & Loudon (C&L) Railway. As freight demand diminished, Penn Central Transportation Company officially canceled the C&L Railroad on July 28, 1973.

== Future expansion ==
In 2014, the University of Maryland, Baltimore County announced plans to connect to the Short Line RR Trail, byway of Spring Grove Hospital Center on Hilltop Road.

== See also ==
- Trolley Line Number 9 Trail
