= Irvington, Baltimore =

Irvington
- neighborhood statistical area
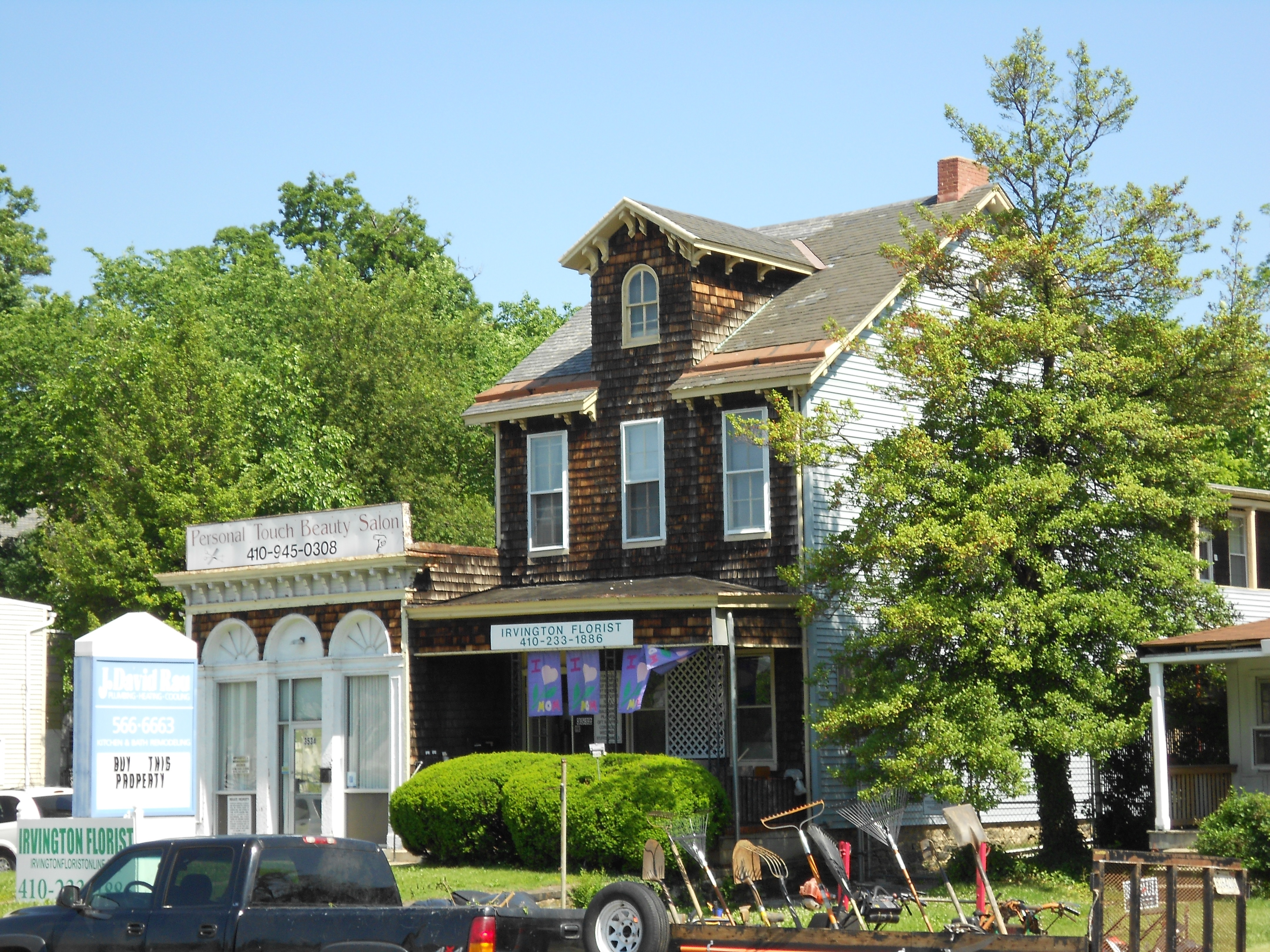
- Storefront view along Frederick Avenue in the Baltimore neighborhood of Irvington

- Location within Baltimore
- Coordinates: 39.281434°N 76.684141°W
- Country: United States
- State: Maryland
- City: Baltimore

Area
  - Total: 0.884 sq mi (2.29 km^{2})
  - Land: 0.884 sq mi (2.29 km^{2})

Population
  - Estimate (2022): 5,402
- Time zone: UTC-5 (Eastern)
  - Summer (DST): UTC-4 (EDT)
- ZIP code: 21229
- Area code: 410, 443, and 667

Irvington is a neighborhood in the Southwest District of Baltimore, located between Yale Heights neighborhood to the west and the Gwynns Falls neighborhood to the east. It was historically nicknamed "Skulltown" for its three large cemeteries: Loudon Park, Mount Olivet and New Cathedral.

More than 50 percent of the homes in Irvington were built before 1950. Its population in 2022 was estimated at 5,402.

The community's boundary with the Gwynns Falls neighborhood is drawn by Caton Avenue and the MARC Penn Line. Its boundary with Yale Heights follows Maiden Choice Run from Frederick Avenue (north) to Loudon Park Cemetery (south). Irvington's southwest corner encompasses Loudon Park Cemetery, ending at Beechfield Avenue (west), where it meets the Beechfield neighborhood and Wilkens Avenue (south).

== Founding of Irvington ==
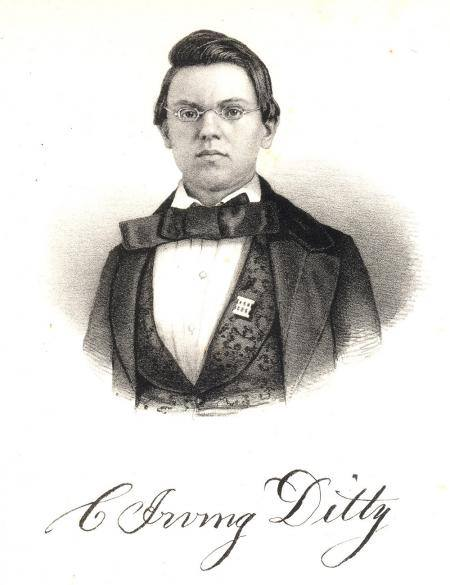
Baltimore lawyer C. Irving Ditty, founder of the Irvington neighborhood

The land that would become Irvington was originally composed of stands of old-growth trees and a clear, spring-fed stream. In 1830, the property of over 100 acres was purchased by Henry Schwartze with the financial help of his father, Augustus Jacob Schwartze, a German immigrant and successful early stock investor in the textile mills near Ellicott City. Sophia Leypold Schwartze, Henry's daughter, was the heir to the family's Schwartze Mansion and the surrounding farmland and forest. During the Civil War, Sophia's brother, Augustus Schwartze, served with and befriended C. Irving Ditty, a Baltimore lawyer. After Augustus was killed in the war, Ditty returned and married his friend's sister. The history of Irvington begins with this marriage between Sophia and the Confederate veteran Ditty in 1868.

Ditty moved into the Schwartze Mansion, where his new wife Sophia and her widowed mother were living. In 1870, Ditty began selling off the family land around the mansion for housing development. Ditty had three dirt streets laid out, running north and south between the two turnpikes. He commissioned a contractor, A.S. Potter, to build four houses on the westernmost avenue, which he named Augusta after his eldest daughter. He named the other two streets Collins and Loudon. The neighborhood, Irvington, first appeared on an 1877 map. After suffering from paraplegia for six years, Ditty died on October 3, 1887, at the age of 51. A. S. Potter continued living in Irvington, at 233 Augusta Ave, well into the 20th century.

The first homes built in the 1870s were described as having modern conveniences, like bathtubs with hot and cold water, and gas fixtures. They also had the "somewhat novel" earth closet, patented by Henry Moule, on both upper and lower floors.

== Public transportation ==
CityLink Purple passes through Irvington as it travels between Dundalk and Catonsville. The bus serves stops on Frederick Avenue and Yale Avenue.

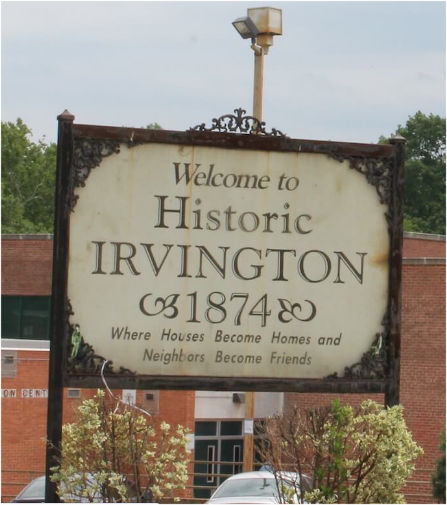

Quickbus Route 46 stops at Frederick Avenue and Augusta Avenue in Irvington as it travels between the Paradise Avenue loop and the Cedonia loop. It operates only on weekdays, from 5 a.m. to 6 p.m.

An estimated 37.6% of the neighborhood's population commutes to work on the MTA buses in 2022.

== Schools ==
Mount St. Joseph College, located at 4403 Frederick Avenue in Irvington, is a Catholic high school for boys in grades 9 through 12. It was founded in 1876 by the Xavarian Brothers on the former Lusby estate.

St. Joseph Monastery School originally consisted of only Whiteford Hall. This addition was added in 1955 due to increasing enrollment.

St. Joseph Monastery School, founded in 1889 by the Passionists Priests of St. Joseph's Monastery, was established as a parish school on the property known as Cedar Lawn. The School Sisters of Notre Dame assumed responsibility for teaching at the school and on August 22, 1890, the first three Sisters arrived. Forty students were enrolled at its opening. As enrollment grew rapidly, a separate school building was constructed in Irvington at 3601 Old Frederick Road. On February 22, 1893, St. Joseph's Monastery School was dedicated by Cardinal Gibbons. In 1923, a new convent was completed to house the growing community of Sisters. Enrollment continued to increase and on October 3, 1954, ground was broken for a new 12-classroom addition to the school, offering enrollment from first through eighth grades. On September 18, 1955, the two-story brick addition to the school was blessed by Archbishop Keough. The school had steady enrollment until an increasing number of families began moving to the suburbs.

St. Bernardine's Catholic School, previously St. Joseph's Monastery School, opened in 1997 at 3601 Old Frederick Road, offering enrollment to kindergarten through grade 8. It closed its doors on June 4, 2010. The school was one of 13 in the archdiocese selected for closing at the end of the 2009/2010 school year.

=== Nearby schools ===
Two public schools are located in adjoining neighborhoods.

- Beechfield Elementary School, at 301 South Beechfield Avenue in Yale Heights, serves children from pre-kindergarten through grade 6.
- Sarah M. Roach Elementary School, at 3434 Old Frederick Road in the neighborhood of St. Joseph, serves pre-kindergarten through grade 5. CLOSED

== Significant landmarks ==
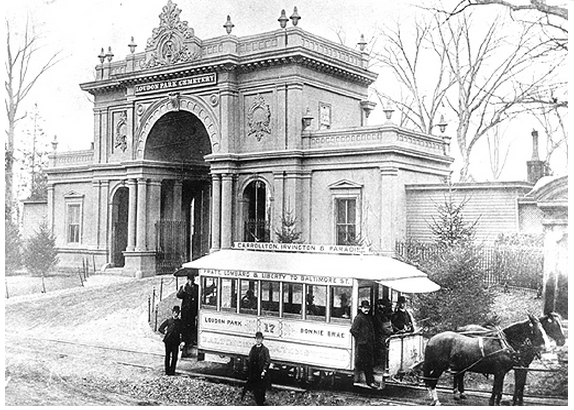
The ornate gateway to Loudon Park Cemetery in the Irvington area of Catonsville, which was built in the 1850s and later demolished for the structures existing in 1998. Photo shows a horsecar of the Baltimore, Catonsville and Ellicott's Mills Railway with destination signs for Carrollton, Irvington and Paradise on its side. By 1883 the line had come under the control of the United Passenger Railway.

=== Irvington Theatre ===
Since it opened at 4113 Frederick Avenue in January 1925, the Irvington Theatre, with its marquee sign was a prominent landmark of the community. After remodeling in 1967, it was renamed the Irvington Cinema and began screening classic and foreign films.

The cinema's marquee became a somewhat less welcome presence, in a predominately Catholic neighborhood, when the cinema began screening adult films in 1969. It closed in May 1971 in response to local protests. In September 1971, the building was converted into a church. A marquee sign is no longer attached to the building.

=== St. Joseph's Monastery ===
St. Joseph's Passionist Monastery and St. Joseph's Monastery Parish, located at 3801 Old Frederick Road, constructed from blue granite blocks, are among the city's most beautiful historic structures. The Passionist Order was invited to Baltimore in 1865 by Archbishop Martin John Spalding. In 1868, the Passionists built a small wooden church on a tract of land along Frederick Avenue, opposite Loudon Park Cemetery. This building became known as the "Church of the Passion", marking the beginning of St. Joseph's Monastery Parish.

Construction of a new, larger church began in 1881 and was completed in 1883. Its cornerstone was placed by Cardinal James Gibbons. The original monastery, beside the church, burned down in 1883. A new monastery was completed in 1886. The monastery chapel is extant and contains an 1887 Niemann pipe organ.

The congregation of St. Joseph's Monastery Parish outgrew their church building in the following century. In 1931, Archbishop Michael Joseph Curley placed the cornerstone for the parish's current church building. It was completed on October 2, 1932.

In April 2014, Father Thomas McCann, administrator of St. Joseph's, announced that the Passionist Priests would "no longer shepherd" St. Joseph's Monastery Church after 149 years of residence. The order's departure date was scheduled for June 30, 2014. The Very Rev. Robert Joerger, the provincial of the Passionists, reflected on the advanced age of many members of his religious order, as well as the declining numbers of that order, in the decision to leave Baltimore for other places. The Archdiocese of Baltimore assumed responsibility for St. Joseph's facilities on June 30, 2014.
