= Triaca Company =

Brewery and distributor in Baltimore, Maryland, US

Coordinates: 39°33′33″N 76°40′20″W

The Triaca Company was a brewery and distributor located in Baltimore, Maryland.

== History ==
The Triaca Company was founded in 1882 by Marcello Triaca on 98 Light Street and Camden Avenue in Baltimore, Maryland. Triaca gained some national notoriety in 1884 for losing $5,600 to a fellow Italian in an elaborate swindle involving money handling.

With Prohibition pending, all liquor distributors were given until January 16, 1920, to sell or export their stocks out of the United States. In December 1919, Triaca company president Charles Vincenti shipped thirty-six thousand cases and twelve thousand barrels of whiskey to Bimini. Vincenti was taken by force in a boat raid by revenue agents and taken back to Baltimore for trial before the British Colonial Government demanded his return for capture in their territorial waters. In 1920, whiskey was distributed to cooperative households throughout the Baltimore area such as the A.T. Carozza Ingleside Mansion in Catonsville. Carozza, a road contractor, bought a steamship from the Navy and sued the government to return his 500-case whiskey gift from Vincenti. After agents seized cases of whiskey, a trial was held against the owners, drivers, salesmen, and holders of the whiskey in 1922. The trial became part of the Triaca Conspiracy, also known as the "Million Dollar Whiskey Conspiracy".

== Timeline ==
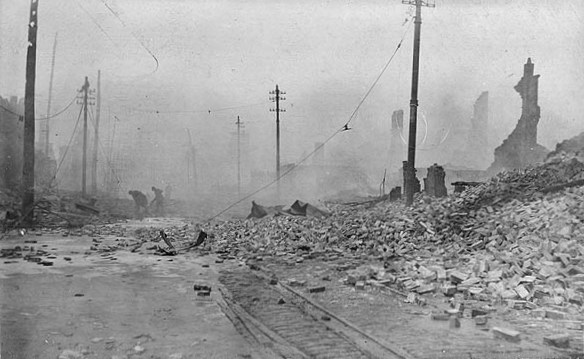
1904 Baltimore Fire

- 1882: Company founded
- 1890: Moved to Light Street and Camden Avenue
- 1904: Great Baltimore Fire
- 1909: Moved to Light and Pratt Street

== See also ==
- List of defunct breweries in the United States
