= Saint Agnes, Baltimore =

- neighborhood statistical area
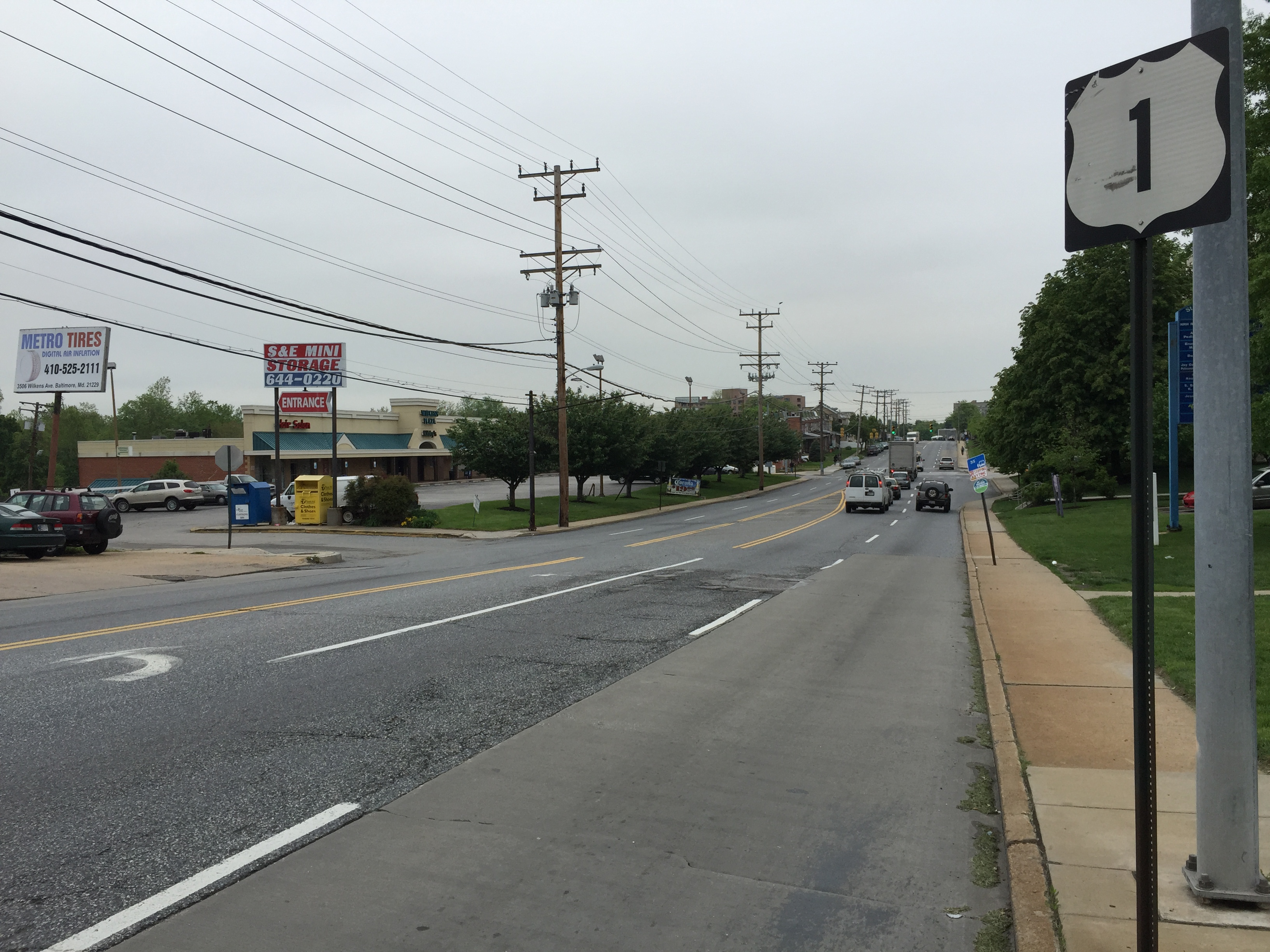
- View north along 3400 block of Wilkens Avenue in Baltimore, with commercial buildings in Saint Agnes to the left

- Location within Baltimore
- Coordinates: 39.274192°N 76.674013°W
- Country: United States
- State: Maryland
- City: Baltimore

Area
  - Total: 0.098 sq mi (0.25 km^{2})
  - Land: 0.098 sq mi (0.25 km^{2})

Population (2009)
  - Total: 532
  - Density: 5,400/sq mi (2,100/km^{2})
- Time zone: UTC-5 (Eastern)
  - Summer (DST): UTC-4 (EDT)
- ZIP code: 21229
- Area code: 410, 443, and 667

Saint Agnes is a neighborhood in the Southwest District of Baltimore, located between the neighborhoods of Irvington (north) and Violetville (south). Its boundaries are marked by Wilkens Avenue (south), Caton Avenue (east) and Loudon Park Cemetery (northwest). Saint Agnes Hospital is located on the opposite side (south) of Wilkens Avenue.

== Public transportation ==
LocalLink 56 (BaltimoreLink) provides bus service along Wilkens Avenue, traveling between Franklin Square (east) and Arbutus (west).

== See also ==
List of Baltimore neighborhoods
