= Nan Agle =

American author

- Agle in 2005 at age 100
- Born: Anna Bradford Hayden; April 13, 1905; Baltimore, Maryland, U.S.
- Died: February 14, 2006 (aged 100); Sykesville, Maryland, U.S.
- Education: Goucher College, Maryland Institute of Art
- Occupations: Author, teacher
- Spouses: Harold H. Cecil (m. 1925; div. 1944) John Agle (m. 1947)
- Children: 2

Nan Hayden Agle (born Anna Bradford Hayden; April 13, 1905 – February 14, 2006) was an American children's book writer.

== Biography ==
She was born in Baltimore, Maryland to Charles Swett Hayden and Emily Spencer Hayden. She was a granddaughter of the chief editorial writer for the Baltimore Sun, Edward Spencer. She attended Goucher College. She married Harold H. Cecil in 1925, with whom she had two sons but the union ended in divorce. She married, secondly, to John Agle in 1947. Once her two sons were in school, she returned to Maryland Institute College of Art and earned a fine arts degree, studying with artist Herman Maril.

Nan was an art teacher at Friends School of Baltimore and at the Baltimore Museum of Art, and was a member of Delta Gamma sorority. She and Ellen Wilson co-authored a series of children's books known as the Three Boys series, about the adventures of the fictional triplet boys: Abercrombie, Benjamin and Christopher. The first book of the series, Three Boys and a Lighthouse was completed in 1951. Its success led to more stories about adventures of the triplets, with an adventure to the seaside at the end of the series. In 1973, she wrote a book titled Susan's Magic later changed into Susan and Sereena and the Cat's Place. Another of her books documented the adventures of a former slave.

Nan Hayden Agle died at the age of 100 at her home in Sykesville, Maryland, following a fall.

== Bibliography ==
=== Three Boys series ===
- Three Boys and a Lighthouse, co-authored with Ellen Wilson, Scribner (1951), ISBN 978-0684126302
- Three Boys and the Remarkable Cow, Charles Scribner's Sons, New York; First Edition (1952), ASIN B000IFMATQ
- Three Boys and a Tugboat, Scribner (1953), ISBN 978-0684134451
- Three Boys and a Mine, co-authored with Ellen Wilson, Charles Scribner's Sons; First Printing edition (1954), ASIN B000IFMALY
- Three Boys and a Train, co-authored with Ellen Wilson, Charles Scribner's Sons (1956), ASIN B0007DVSFQ
- Three Boys and a Helicopter, co-authored with Ellen Wilson, Scribner; first edition (1958), ASIN B000IFKBWO
- Three Boys and Space, Scribner (June 1962), ISBN 978-0684126784
- Three Boys and H2O, co-authored with Ellen Wilson, Scribner; first edition (June 1968), ISBN 978-0684207216

=== Other books ===
- Constance the Honeybee, John C. Winston Company (1959), ASIN B0007EXCK4, illustrated by Richard Q. Yardley
- Princess Mary of Maryland, Tradition Press (1967), Literary Licensing LLC (2012), ISBN 978-1258406899, illustrated by Aaron Sopher
- Free to Stay: The True Story of Eliza Benson and the Family She Stood by for Three Generations, Arcadia Enterprises, Inc. (December 28, 2000), ISBN 978-0970380203
- A Promise Is to Keep: The True Story of a Slave and the Family She Adopted, Zondervan (December 1985), ISBN 978-0310415916
- Susan's magic, Seabury Press (1973), ASIN B007EQU3PU
- Baney's lake, Seabury Press (1972), ASIN B0006C4ENG, ISBN 978-0816430895
- That Dog Tarr, Scholastic Book Services; first edition (1966), ISBN 978-0590045087, illustrated by Barbara Seuling
- The Ingenious John Banvard, co-authored with Frances Atchinson Bacon, Seabury Press; first edition (1966), ASIN B0007DVMF2
- The Lords of Baltimore, co-authored with Frances Atchinson Bacon, Holt; first edition (1962), ISBN 978-1125768815, Holt Rinehart & Winston; 5th Printing edition (1969), ISBN 978-0030351853, illustrated by Leonard Vosburgh
- My animals and me; An autobiographical story, Seabury Press (1970), ASIN B0006CPIEU
- Makon and the Dauphin, Charles Schribner's Sons, first edition (1961), ASIN B000NR8MX2
- Kish's Colt, Seabury Press, New York (1968), ASIN B00ABE2WTM
- Kate and the Apple Tree, Seabury Press (June 1972), ISBN 978-0816430345

== Sources ==
- Commire, Anne. Something About the Author, Volume 3. Gale Research, 1972
