= Earl and Darielle Linehan Concert Hall =

Music hall at the University of Maryland

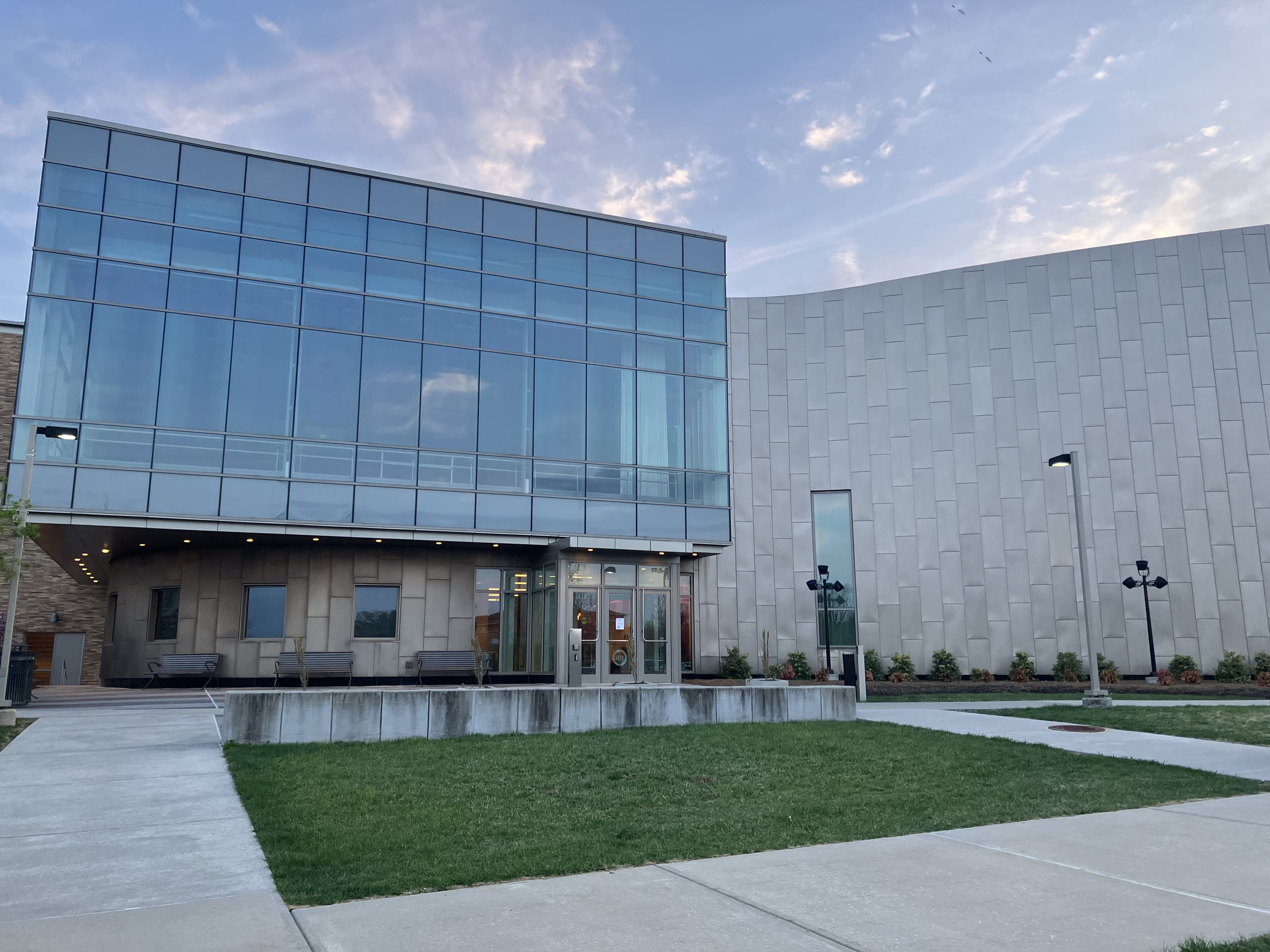
- Concert hall exterior
- Interactive map of Earl and Darielle Linehan Concert Hall
- Address: Performing Arts & Humanities Bldg. Hilltop Circle & Hilltop Road; Baltimore, Maryland; United States
- Coordinates: 39.255693°N 76.716007°W
- Owner: University of Maryland, Baltimore County
- Capacity: 375

Construction
- Opened: 2014
- Architects: William Rawn Associates; Grimm and Parker Architects

Website
- Website

The Earl and Darielle Linehan Concert Hall, previously known as the UMBC Concert Hall is the main theater of the University of Maryland, Baltimore County campus in Baltimore, Maryland. The theater is located in the Performing Arts and Humanities Building, the university's home for Ancient Studies, Dance, English, Music, Philosophy, and Theatre departments. The theater is the designated concert hall for the university's symphony orchestra and other ensembles.

Construction began in 2012 and was completed in the fall of 2014. The concert hall provides space for an orchestra, stage, and seating up to 375 individuals.

== Awards ==
Along with the rest of the Performing Arts and Humanities Building, the Concert Hall was issued LEED silver status by the U.S. Green Building Council (USGBC).

In addition, the building was given the Higher Education Design Award by the American Institute of Architects Baltimore Chapter.
