= Beaverdam station =

Historic structure in Virginia, US

- Beaverdam Depot
- U.S. National Register of Historic Places
- Virginia Landmarks Register
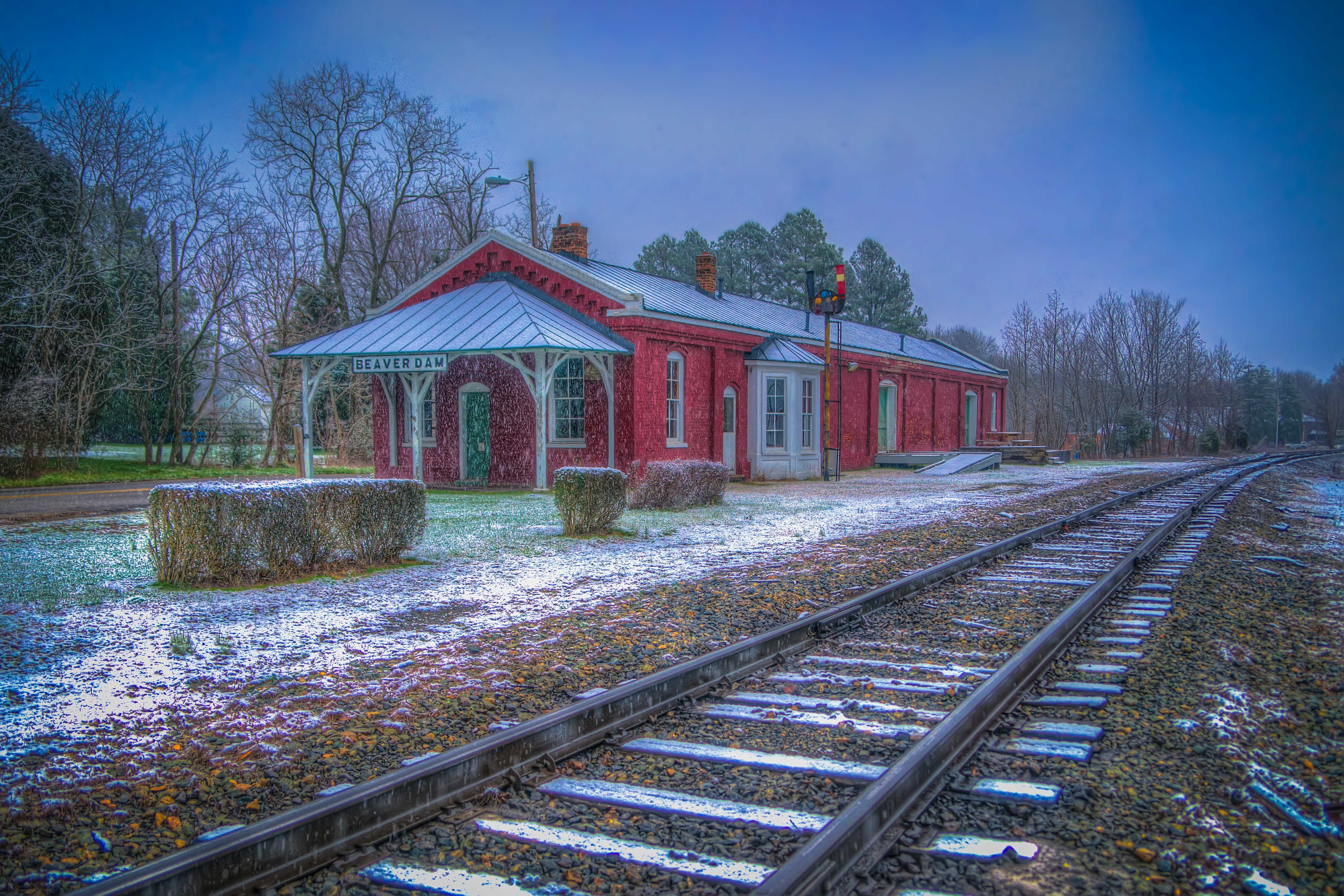
- Beaverdam Depot in Winter

- Location within Virginia Location within the United States
- Location: On C & O RR tracks at jct. of VA 715 and 739, Beaverdam, Virginia
- Coordinates: 37°56′27″N 77°39′15″W
- Area: less than one acre
- Built: 1866
- Architectural style: Late Victorian
- NRHP reference No.: 88002060
- VLR No.: 042-0081

Significant dates
- Added to NRHP: November 8, 1988
- Designated VLR: April 19, 1988

Beaverdam station is a historic railway depot located at Beaverdam, Hanover County, Virginia. It is sometimes called "Beaver Dam" or "Beaverdam", and sometimes "Depot" or "Station", with these last names capitalized or not, creating multiple spelling variations in the historical record.

== History ==
The Richmond, Fredericksburg and Potomac Railroad built a station at Beaverdam on its Louisa line at some time between 1836 and 1840. The railroad's president, Edward Fontaine, lived nearby. The 36 mile Louisa branch connected Louisa with Hanover Junction. Louisa County farmers could thus ship their produce to the port at Aquia on the Potomac River as well as to Richmond, Virginia. During the 1840s, the Commonwealth of Virginia helped finance extension of this branch westward over the Blue Ridge Mountains to Covington in Allegheny County. In 1850 the railroad line's name was changed the Virginia Central Railroad.

The station and railroad proved strategic during the American Civil War, both for troop movement and for transport and storage of military supplies. The wood frame depot changed hands and was destroyed at least three times. On July 20, 1862, John Mosby was captured by Union cavalry under Brigadier General Rufus King while waiting for a train. Later versions of the incident disagree as to whether Mosby was trying to convey information to his commander, General Stonewall Jackson in Richmond, or taking brief leave toward his parents' home in Lynchburg, Virginia, but all agree that Mosby was soon released as part of the war's first prisoner exchange, as well as that the Union raiders burnt the depot to destroy supplies, as well as cut the strategic telegraph line.

The last engagement occurred on May 9, 1864, when 500 Confederate soldiers of the First Maryland Cavalry made a dismounted night attack through the woods on a much larger Union force under Sheridan, who were in the process of destroying a massive store of Confederate supplies that had been left at the station for Lee's army. The Union forces planned to immediately afterwards take Richmond, which was defended by only a home guard, but the delaying action by the Maryland cavalry was credited with allowing time for Richmond to be reinforced, saving the city, at least temporarily. The action is more fully described in The Maryland Line in the Confederate States Army (1869).

By the war's end, only 5 miles of Virginia Central tracks remained usable. The Beaverdam station and associated warehouse were among the railroad's first five rebuilt structures; the current station was completed in 1866. The Virginia Central Railroad continued expanding and by the 1880s became part of the Chesapeake and Ohio Railway system. The segregated waiting room was constructed around 1910, after the U.S. Supreme Court's decision in Chiles v. Chesapeake & Ohio Railway, since Virginia's legislature required segregation of white and "colored" passengers after the Plessy v. Ferguson decision in 1896 allowed "separate but equal" facilities.

== Architecture ==
The single-story, rectangular, gable roofed brick building features decorative brickwork, including corbelling and pilasters. The interior is divided into two waiting rooms (one for whites and one for blacks), an office, a baggage room and a freight room—all remarkably intact.

It was listed on the National Register of Historic Places in 1988.

Preceding station	Chesapeake and Ohio Railway	Following station
Tyler toward Cincinnati	Main Line	Hewlett toward Phoebus
