= Ingleside (Catonsville, Maryland) =

Ingleside Mansion
- Interactive map of the Ingleside Mansion area

General information
- Type: House
- Architectural style: Georgian
- Location: Catonsville, Maryland
- Coordinates: 39°17′20″N 76°43′50″W
- Construction started: 1889
- Demolished: 1953

Ingleside is a historic home that once stood in Catonsville, Maryland.

== History ==
=== Ingleside ===
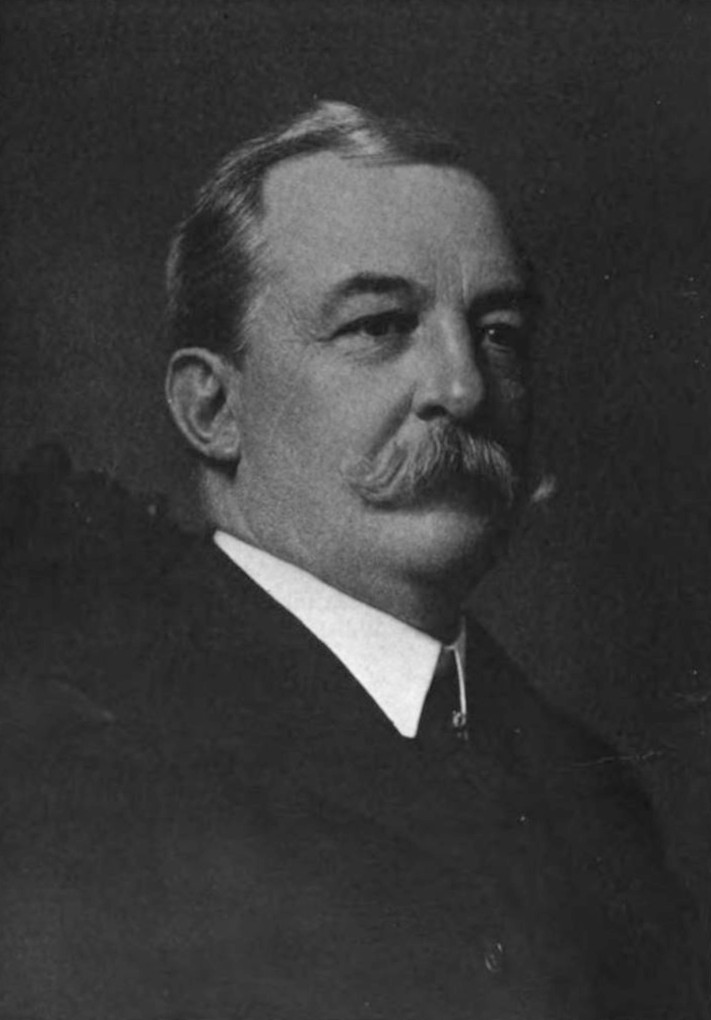
Bernard N. Baker

Bernard N. Baker (1854–1918) was a prominent businessman, who became one of the wealthiest men in Baltimore in later life. He was a trustee of the Johns Hopkins University, who funded research. In 1877 Baker married Elizabeth Elton Livzey. In 1889 Baker incorporated the Atlantic Transport Line in London, and chose to start construction of the Ingleside Mansion.

The mansion was built on 300 acres (120 ha) of property that Baker inherited and an adjoining parcel he purchased. The building was based on an English home, with 49 rooms. The outside was clad in fieldstone. The roof was red tile. Fireplace mantles were hand carved. Several tenant houses and a formal garden were built on the property. A world traveler, Baker described Ingleside as his only true home.

In April 1918, the Bakers turned the mansion over to Company C of the food production committee of the women's section of the Maryland defense council to support the war efforts. Women farmers would tend crops for $1.20 a day, compared to the going rate of $2.00 a day for male labor. There was some resistance in the community to using women laborers. Governor Emerson Harrington gave a speech at the mansion porch in support of the efforts in July 1918. Troops were also able to live at the house and commute to war-effort jobs. Most of Baker's ships were lost in the war. He died later that year in California.

Ingleside was then purchased by Antonio Carozza in August 1919. Carozza was a businessman who specialized in road construction, operating Fisher & Carozza Brothers and also the Carozza-Rowe Construction Company. He also operated a quarry in nearby Ellicott City, Maryland. In May 1920 Carozza was charged with violating the Volstead Act with the seizure of 470 to 520 cases of whiskey worth $50,000 on the premises. The trial became part of the Triaca Conspiracy, also known as the "Million Dollar Whiskey Conspiracy" of 1922. Afterward, Carozza and John H. Leonard purchased the steamship Bella from the U.S. Navy for $250,000, forming the Bella Steamship company, telling the media he did not know what he would use it for. The Bella was scuttled on 18 June 1922 in San Salvador followed by an insurance claim.

Early in 1926, Carozza mortgaged the Ingleside estate to his Carozza-Rowe business partner H.M. Rowe. However, in May 1926 at the Rowe family's home near Ingleside, Rowe's son Harry M. Rowe Jr. killed his father by hitting him in the head with a crowbar, stabbed his half-sister, pushed his stepmother into a fireplace fire, and was found dead in the Severn River in Annapolis, Maryland soon afterward. Following this incident, Carozza mortgaged the Ingleside estate to attorney Addison E. Mullikin, who used it as a campaign workplace in his unsuccessful 1926 bid to become Maryland's governor.

Through the 1930s Carozza rented rooms in the mansion to different families. By the time Carozza died in June 1950, the estate was reduced to 230 acres.

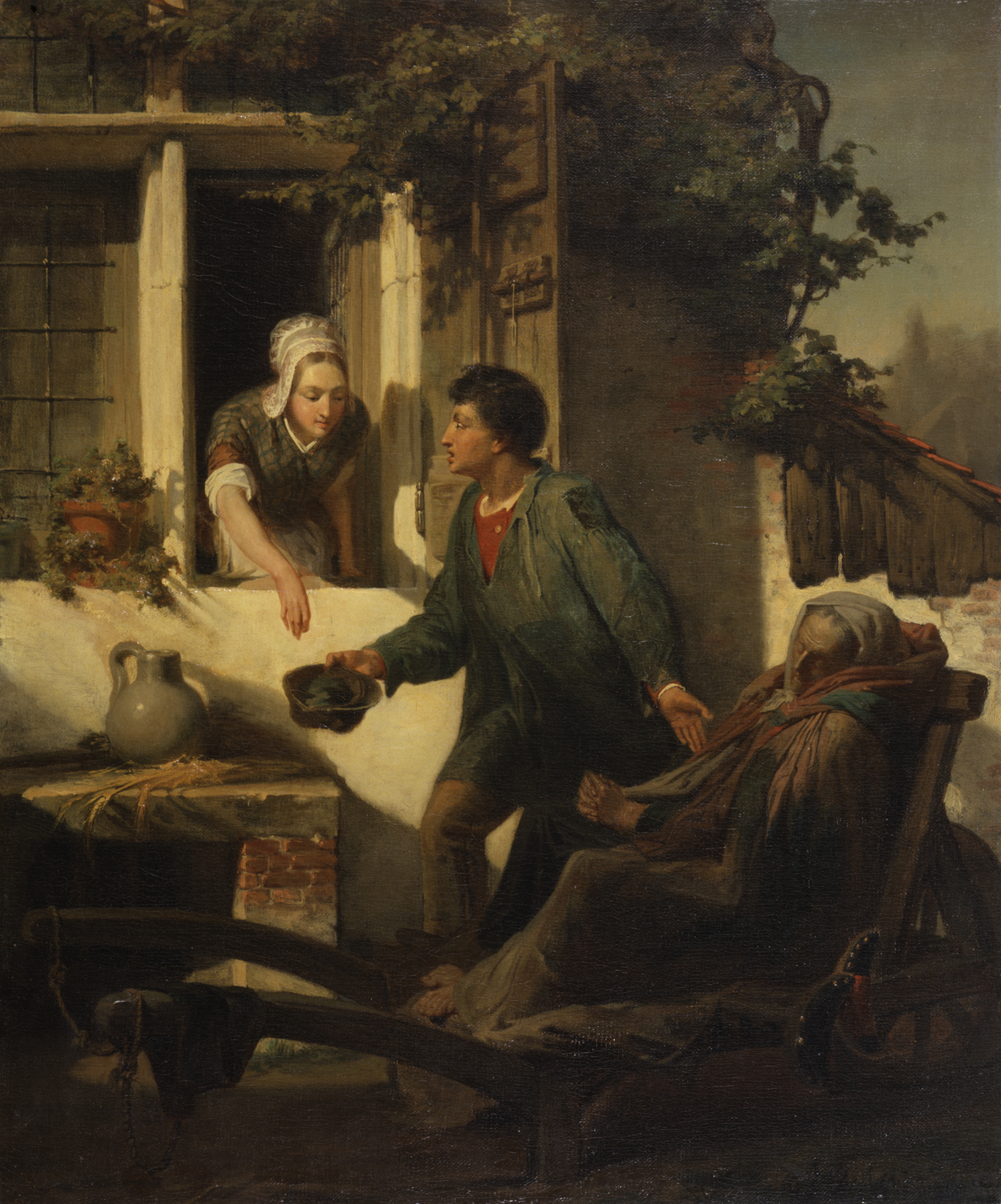
The Blind Beggar

Ingleside burned down in 1953. "The Blind Beggar", an 1856 oil painting bought by Baker, once hung in the mansion. The Lawrence Alma-Tadema painting was inherited by Antonio Carozza's grandson in 1954. The painting was not damaged in the fire that gutted the mansion and was later donated as part of the Walters Art Museum collection in 2000.

=== Ingleside Shopping Center ===
The site of the Ingleside mansion is now occupied by the Ingleside shopping center. In 1954, business partners Melvin J. Berman and Arthur Robinson branched out from their real estate and milk product operations at the Maryland Milk Producers plant in Laurel. Bermans' son was quoted as saying that the property along Route 40 was purchased solely to set up an ice cream shop, but plans were expanded to become a regional shopping center, including an Acme supermarket, Giant Food, Read's drugstore, and Woolworth's. The Bermans rapidly expanded local operations, building the Laurel Shopping Center in 1956, and later joined with The Rouse Company to develop their largest project, the planned city of Columbia, Maryland.

Nearby Ingleside Avenue and Baker Avenue are named for the Ingleside mansion and its original owner Bernard N. Baker, respectively.
