= 1st Maryland Cavalry Battalion (Confederate) =

- Active: May, 1862–April, 1865
- Allegiance: Confederate States of America
- Branch: Volunteer Army
- Type: Cavalry
- Engagements: American Civil War Maryland campaign Gettysburg campaign Valley campaigns of 1864; Overland Campaign

Commanders
- Notable commanders: Colonel Harry Gilmor William E. Jones (general); Gus Dorsey C. Irving Ditty

The 1st Maryland Cavalry Battalion was a small Confederate cavalry unit during the American Civil War.

== History ==
On May 15, 1862, a group of Marylanders who had been attached to the 1st Virginia Cavalry formed what would formally become the 1st Maryland under Ridgely Brown of Montgomery County. The group was attached to Stonewall Jackson's Corp and participated in Valley Campaign. It served with the 2nd Virginia Cavalry Regiment under Thomas T. Munford. On September 4, it crossed the Potomac River at Edward's Ferry participated in the Maryland Campaign. But did not actively fight at Antietam. The unit served under George H. Steuart in the Maryland Line. It formally was organized at Winchester on November 25, 1862, and staff officers were appointed. In spring 1863, the unit was part of the Jones–Imboden Raid under Grumble Jones. Summer 1863 saw it invade the North with the Army of Northern Virginia. It was attached to Ewell's Corps and acted as scouts and messengers. After the Battle of Gettysburg a portion of the unit, served with John Imboden's men escorting the wounded. Members of the unit also fought at Monterey Pass. On July 6, it participated at the Battle of Hagerstown.

In early May 1864 a portion of the unit "annoyed" a group of George Custer's Michigan cavalry. Then Colonel Brown was killed on June 1, near the South Anna River. It participated at the Battle of Trevilian Station In July 1864, it again encountered the Michigan cavalry and it drove the unit to Hanover Town, Virginia. In 1864 a section of the unit, as part of the Valley Campaigns of 1864, invaded Maryland and took part in Gilmor's Raid across Maryland. July 30 saw it engage, along with the other troops under John McCausland, in the burning of Chambersburg, Pennsylvania In August, it raided Moorefield, West Virginia.

In 1865, it served in the Appomattox campaign. It was again attached to Munford. At the very end of the war it dispersed and the men returned to their homes rather than surrender to the Union. This after receiving a letter in late April, from Munford near Lynchburg.

== See also ==
- Maryland Civil War Confederate Units
- Lists of American Civil War Regiments by State
