= Catonsville, Maryland =

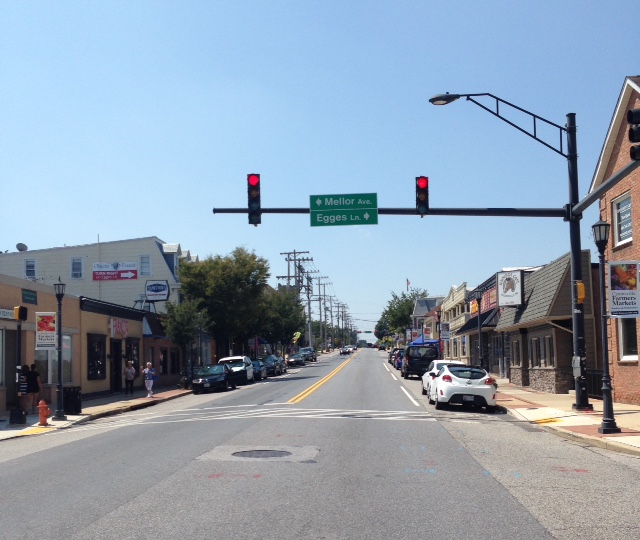
- Frederick Road in Downtown Catonsville
- Nicknames: "Music City, Maryland", "Cville", "The Ville"
- Motto: "Life is great in 21228"
- Location of Catonsville, Maryland
- Coordinates: 39°16′26″N 76°44′17″W
- Country: United States
- State: Maryland
- County: Baltimore
- Established: January 20, 1831

Area
  - Total: 14.04 sq mi (36.37 km^{2})
  - Land: 13.96 sq mi (36.16 km^{2})
  - Water: 0.081 sq mi (0.21 km^{2})
- Elevation: 479 ft (146 m)

Population (2020)
  - Total: 44,701
  - Density: 3,201.8/sq mi (1,236.22/km^{2})
- Time zone: UTC−5 (Eastern (EST))
  - Summer (DST): UTC−4 (EDT)
- ZIP codes: 21228, 21229, 21250
- Area codes: 410, 443, and 667
- FIPS code: 24-14125
- GNIS feature ID: 0583624

Catonsville (/ˈkeɪtənzˌvɪl/) is a town in Baltimore County, Maryland, United States. The population was 44,701 at the 2020 US Census. The community is a streetcar suburb of Baltimore along the city's western border. The town is known for its proximity to the Patapsco River and Patapsco Valley State Park, making it a regional mountain biking hub. The town is also notable as a local hotbed of music, earning it the official nickname of "Music City, Maryland." Catonsville contains the majority of the University of Maryland, Baltimore County (UMBC), a major public research university with close to 14,000 students.

== History ==
=== Pre-colonial ===
The area of present-day Catonsville was not inhabited by large numbers of Native Americans. The region served as a hunting ground or a means of transit, specifically for the Susquehannocks, who lived to the north. By the mid-17th century, any meaningful presence in this region, alongside the Chesapeake Bay, vanished—the 1652 Articles of Peace and Friendship, specifically, essentially ended Susquehannock life in Maryland. Thus, they disappeared decades before the first settlers encroached on the area.

The Native Americans had left behind a number of trails, some of which the earliest settlers adopted them for their own purposes. Rolling Road, for example, originated as a Native American trail, beginning from Elkridge Landing, and traveling north through present-day Catonsville—the road was repurposed as a "rolling road" used to roll hogsheads of tobacco, hence its current name. Another trail was the Old Frederick Road, now known regionally as Johnnycake Road, which began at a point along Gwynns Falls, and traveling northwest, forming what is now Catonsville's northern boundary. Another potential Native American trail is Old Frederick Road, branching off from the aforementioned road southwest toward Frederick Road near Ellicott City.

=== Hunting Ridge ===
The Catonsville region and the surrounding Patapsco River valley remained unsettled for much of Maryland's early history, as early communication depended on major bodies of water, and not by land. The region northwest of present-day Catonsville's core served as hunting grounds for early explorers, and was known in the 17th century and early 18th century as Hunting Ridge, as early hunters and trappers subsisted off game such as deer to feed and clothe themselves. However, it would be decades before the region underwent the settlement process.

=== Early settlement ===
The earliest formal settlement of present-day Catonsville began in the second half of the 17th century. Incoming settlers at first followed streams by boat or trail, until embarking further uphill for uncultivated land, often using the aforementioned Native trails, as existing settlers took up most of the desirable land around major waterways. It is uncertain if Catonsville's earliest settlers came primarily via the Patapsco or Patuxent rivers. Settlers from the latter would have traversed Anne Arundel County, before fording the Patapsco River at Elkridge Landing. As the southern shore of the Patapsco River began to fill with settlers, others began to look northward, a movement which soon increased in rapidity through the latter decades of the century. By the year 1695, much of Hunting Ridge had been settled through land grants, and most of present-day Catonsville land comes from these original land grants. Many of these lands' patenters and proprietors, however, did not live on their properties, instead residing largely in Anne Arundel County. It would be another century or so for true settlement to occur in the area.

=== Catonsville ===
The history of present-day Catonsville follows its main artery, Frederick Road, which the town eventually developed around. In 1787, the Ellicott family built the Frederick Turnpike to transport goods from their flour mill, Ellicott Mills, to the Baltimore harbor. Charles Carroll, a signer of the Declaration of Independence, owned the land around the then newly built road. He instructed his son-in-law, Richard Caton, to develop the area along the road. Caton and his wife, Mary Carroll Caton, lived in Castle Thunder, constructed on the Frederick Turnpike in 1787.

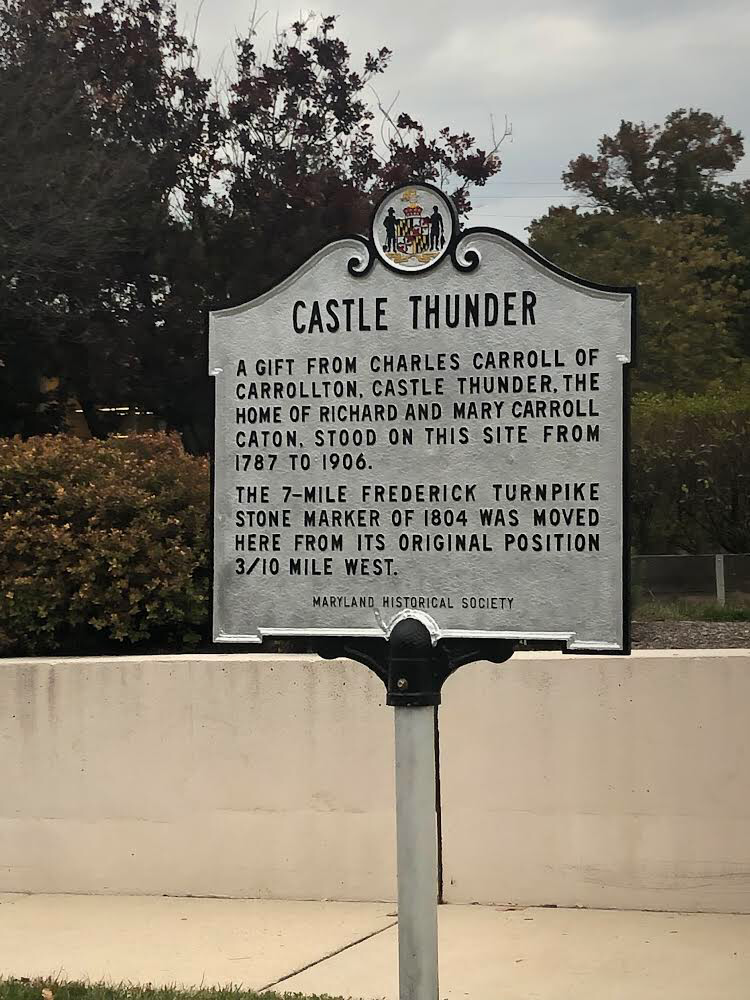
Marker at the mythical location of Castle Thunder on Frederick Road

Caton gave his name to the community and called it "Catonville," although the name was changed to "Catonsville" in the 1830s. Businesses were built along the Frederick Turnpike for travelers traveling from Ellicott City to Baltimore. Catonsville served as a layover stop for travelers and the town increasingly grew and developed. The pleasant surroundings attracted wealthy Baltimore merchants who built large Victorian and colonial summer homes to escape Baltimore's summer heat. Starting in 1862, horsecar services connected Catonsville to Baltimore. In 1884, the Catonsville Short Line railroad was built, providing 8 roundtrip trains to Baltimore daily. This allowed residents to commute to work in Baltimore. Commuter traffic exploded in the 1890s with the construction of electric streetcar lines and fancy housing developments. Catonsville had become one of the first commuter suburbs in the United States. Baltimore has tried to annex Catonsville, although their attempts have all been failures. The last attempt was in 1918.

Homes of all sizes were constructed rapidly through the 1970s, when much of land around the Frederick Turnpike had been converted into housing. A new and modern business district opened along the newly built Baltimore National Pike, north from the Frederick Turnpike.

Catonsville was briefly made famous during the 1968 protest by the "Catonsville Nine", during which draft records were burned by Catholic anti-war activists.

In 2002, the Maryland legislature issued a proclamation declaring Catonsville to be "Music City, Maryland", because of the concentration of musical retail stores, venues and educational facilities in the area. Life Sounds Great is a series of compilation albums highlighting Catonsville musicians.

In 2007, Money magazine ranked Catonsville the 49th best place to live in the United States and the third best in Maryland and Virginia.

== Geography ==
Catonsville is located at 39°16′26″N 76°44′17″W (39.273756, −76.738012). According to the United States Census Bureau, the CDP has a total area of 14.0 square miles (36 km^{2}), all land.

Catonsville lies above the Fall Line within the Piedmont Region of Maryland, a region characterized by broad, rolling hills punctuated by streams and rivers. Catonsville overlooks the coastal plain and Chesapeake Bay to the East. The Appalachian Mountains lie approximately 40 miles west of the town.

Catonsville is centered along Frederick Road (Maryland Route 144), once the main road from Baltimore leading to points west replacing what is now called Old Frederick Road. Johnnycake Road and Academy Road form the northern and northeastern boundaries of Catonsville, the Patapsco River provides the western and southern boundaries, Gun Road, Shelbourne Road Linden Avenue, Circle Drive and Wilkens Avenue form the southeastern boundaries while Baltimore City forms the eastern boundary. Catonsville is bordered by Woodlawn to the north, Baltimore to the east, by Arbutus to the southeast, by Ilchester to the southwest, and by Ellicott City to the west.

In addition to Frederick Road (Exit 13), Interstate 695 (the Baltimore Beltway) services Wilkens Avenue (Maryland Route 372), Edmondson Avenue and the Baltimore National Pike (U.S. Route 40) via Exits 12, 14 and 15, respectively, with the latter two thoroughfares later converging in Baltimore City to the east. The main north–south roads in the area are Rolling Road (which is also Maryland Route 166 south of Frederick Road), Ingleside Avenue and Bloomsbury Avenue.

Catonsville is a terminus of the Trolley Line Number 9 Trail and the Short Line Railroad Trail.

== Transportation ==
=== Public transit ===
The Maryland Transit Administration provides bus service to the Catonsville area via the Purple CityLink route with service to Downtown Baltimore, LocalLink routes 37 and 77, and Express BusLink 150 to Columbia. MARC Train provides commuter train service at the nearby Halethorpe station in Arbutus.

=== Roads ===
Major north–south routes in Catonsville include:

- Interstate 695 (Baltimore Beltway) traveling south to north from Glen Burnie to Towson.
- Interstate 195 (Metropolitan Boulevard) traveling east to west from southern Catonsville to BWI Airport.
- Maryland Route 166 (S. Rolling Road) traveling north to south from Frederick Road to Relay. North Rolling Road continues north of Frederick Road to Old Court Road in Randallstown.

Major east–west routes in Catonsville include:

- Interstate 70 traveling east to west from Security Boulevard-Cooks Lane to Frederick.
- U.S. Route 40 (Baltimore National Pike) east to west from Baltimore to Ellicott City.
- Maryland Route 144 (Frederick Road) traveling east to west from Irvington to Ellicott City.
- Maryland Route 372 (Wilkens Avenue) traveling east to west from Southwestern Boulevard to Rolling Road.

== Neighborhoods ==
- Academy Heights, a residential community surrounding Mount de Sales Academy.
- Adil Meadows, a community of about a dozen homes on Adil Court, north of Baltimore National Pike and adjoining North Rolling Road on the east.
- Arden Parke, a small residential area developed in the late 2010s
- Ashton Valley, a residential community in northwest Catonsville, west of North Rolling Road and just south of Interstate 70. Built in the 1990s.
- College Hills, a newer residential community surrounding the Community College of Baltimore County and the University of Maryland, Baltimore County.
- Colonial Gardens, a residential neighborhood along Edmondson Avenue.
- Ellicott Mills, located in northern Catonsville west of North Rolling Road and adjacent to Woodbridge Valley.
- Ingleside, home to Ingleside Shopping Center on Baltimore National Pike.
- Ivy Spring Terrace, a small residential community along Ethel Avenue east of North Rolling Road and north of Baltimore National Pike.
- Paradise, located east of Downtown Catonsville.
- Summit Park, located northwest above Frederick Road adjacent to the Baltimore County Public Library
- Victorian Manor, a community of about a dozen homes on Westburn Road and North Rolling Road, and along Chesworth Road northeast of its intersection with North Rolling Road. Built in the 1980s, except for one house (on North Rolling Road) built in 1925.
- Westchester, located at the crossroads of Westchester and Rockwell Avenues.
- Westerlee, a community of upscale homes north of Baltimore National Pike, along and west of North Rolling Road and extending to Patapsco Valley State Park.
- Western Hills, located north of Downtown Catonsville along North Rolling Road.
- Westview Park, a community of about 1,800 homes, stretching across northern Catonsville north of Baltimore National Pike from North Rolling Road in the west to Johnnycake Road at Ingleside Avenue in the northeast, and straddling I-695 (Baltimore Beltway). It was developed in stages from 1955 to 1967 by the Joseph Meyerhoff Company and Monumental Properties Inc. It includes several houses built before 1955, including a stone mansion built in 1907-1913 and formerly belonging to Dr. H.M. Rowe.
- Winters Lane, bordered to the north by Route 40, to the south by Edmondson Avenue, to the east by Beltway and to the west by Rolling Road, an Historically African-American residential neighborhood
- Woodbridge Valley, located north of Downtown Catonsville along North Rolling Road, north of Baltimore National Pike. A large housing development of roughly 1,000 units, it was developed in the 1970s by Monumental Properties Inc.
- Oak Forest Park, located west of Downtown Catonsville.
- Windwood, residential neighborhood south of Frederick Road and directly west of Oak Forest Park.

== Demographics ==
Historical population
Census	Pop.	Note	%±
1960	37,872		—
1970	34,812		−8.1%
1980	33,208		−4.6%
1990	35,233		6.1%
2000	39,820		13.0%
2010	41,567		4.4%
2020	44,701		7.5%

=== Racial and ethnic composition ===
Catonsville CDP, Maryland – Racial and ethnic composition Note: the US Census treats Hispanic/Latino as an ethnic category. This table excludes Latinos from the racial categories and assigns them to a separate category. Hispanics/Latinos may be of any race.
Race / Ethnicity (NH = Non-Hispanic)	Pop 2000	Pop 2010	Pop 2020	% 2000	% 2010	% 2020
White alone (NH)	32,309	30,514	29,150	81.14%	73.41%	65.21%
Black or African American alone (NH)	4,675	5,954	6,616	11.74%	14.32%	14.80%
Native American or Alaska Native alone (NH)	85	99	69	0.21%	0.24%	0.15%
Asian alone (NH)	1,430	2,598	4,122	3.59%	6.25%	9.22%
Native Hawaiian or Pacific Islander alone (NH)	14	24	15	0.04%	0.06%	0.03%
Other race alone (NH)	68	75	250	0.17%	0.18%	0.56%
Mixed race or Multiracial (NH)	496	895	2,145	1.25%	2.15%	4.80%
Hispanic or Latino (any race)	743	1,408	2,334	1.87%	3.39%	5.22%
Total	39,820	41,567	44,701	100.00%	100.00%	100.00%

=== 2020 census ===
As of the 2020 census, Catonsville had a population of 44,701. The median age was 38.5 years. 19.3% of residents were under the age of 18 and 19.5% of residents were 65 years of age or older. For every 100 females there were 94.2 males, and for every 100 females age 18 and over there were 90.9 males age 18 and over.

99.9% of residents lived in urban areas, while 0.1% lived in rural areas.

There were 16,356 households in Catonsville, of which 28.9% had children under the age of 18 living in them. Of all households, 46.6% were married-couple households, 17.1% were households with a male householder and no spouse or partner present, and 31.3% were households with a female householder and no spouse or partner present. About 32.2% of all households were made up of individuals and 18.2% had someone living alone who was 65 years of age or older.

There were 17,189 housing units, of which 4.8% were vacant. The homeowner vacancy rate was 1.0% and the rental vacancy rate was 6.2%.

Racial composition as of the 2020 census
Race	Number	Percent
White	29,604	66.2%
Black or African American	6,727	15.0%
American Indian and Alaska Native	125	0.3%
Asian	4,142	9.3%
Native Hawaiian and Other Pacific Islander	20	0.0%
Some other race	968	2.2%
Two or more races	3,115	7.0%
Hispanic or Latino (of any race)	2,334	5.2%

=== 2010 census ===
In 2010 Catonsville had a population of 41,567. The ethnic and racial composition of the population was 73.4% non-Hispanic white, 14.3% non-Hispanic black, 0.3% Native American, 6.3% Asian, 0.1% Pacific Islander, 0.2% non-Hispanic from some other race, 2.4% from two or more races and 3.4% Hispanic or Latino from any race.

=== 2000 census ===
As of the census of 2000, there were 39,820 people, 15,503 households, and 9,255 families residing in the CDP. The population density was 2,843.9 inhabitants per square mile (1,098.0/km^{2}). There were 16,054 housing units at an average density of 1,146.6 per square mile (442.7/km^{2}). The racial makeup of the CDP was 82.28% White, 11.83% African American, 0.22% Native American, 3.61% Asian, 0.04% Pacific Islander, 0.59% from other races, and 1.43% from two or more races. Hispanic or Latino of any race were 1.87% of the population.

There were 15,503 households, out of which 25.7% had children under the age of 18 living with them, 46.7% were married couples living together, 9.9% had a female householder with no husband present, and 40.3% were non-families. 33.8% of all households were made up of individuals, and 17.4% had someone living alone who was 65 years of age or older. The average household size was 2.30 and the average family size was 2.98.

In the CDP, the population was spread out, with 19.9% under the age of 18, 12.0% from 18 to 24, 27.2% from 25 to 44, 20.7% from 45 to 64, and 20.2% who were 65 years of age or older. The median age was 39 years. For every 100 females, there were 86.0 males. For every 100 females age 18 and over, there were 81.9 males.

The median income for a household in the CDP was $53,061, and the median income for a family was $67,005. Males had a median income of $44,705 versus $33,420 for females. The per capita income for the CDP was $25,254. About 2.8% of families and 4.6% of the population were below the poverty line, including 3.3% of those under age 18 and 4.1% of those age 65 or over. The median house value for the CDP was $141,300 in the 2000.

== Education ==
=== Primary and secondary education ===
==== Public schools ====
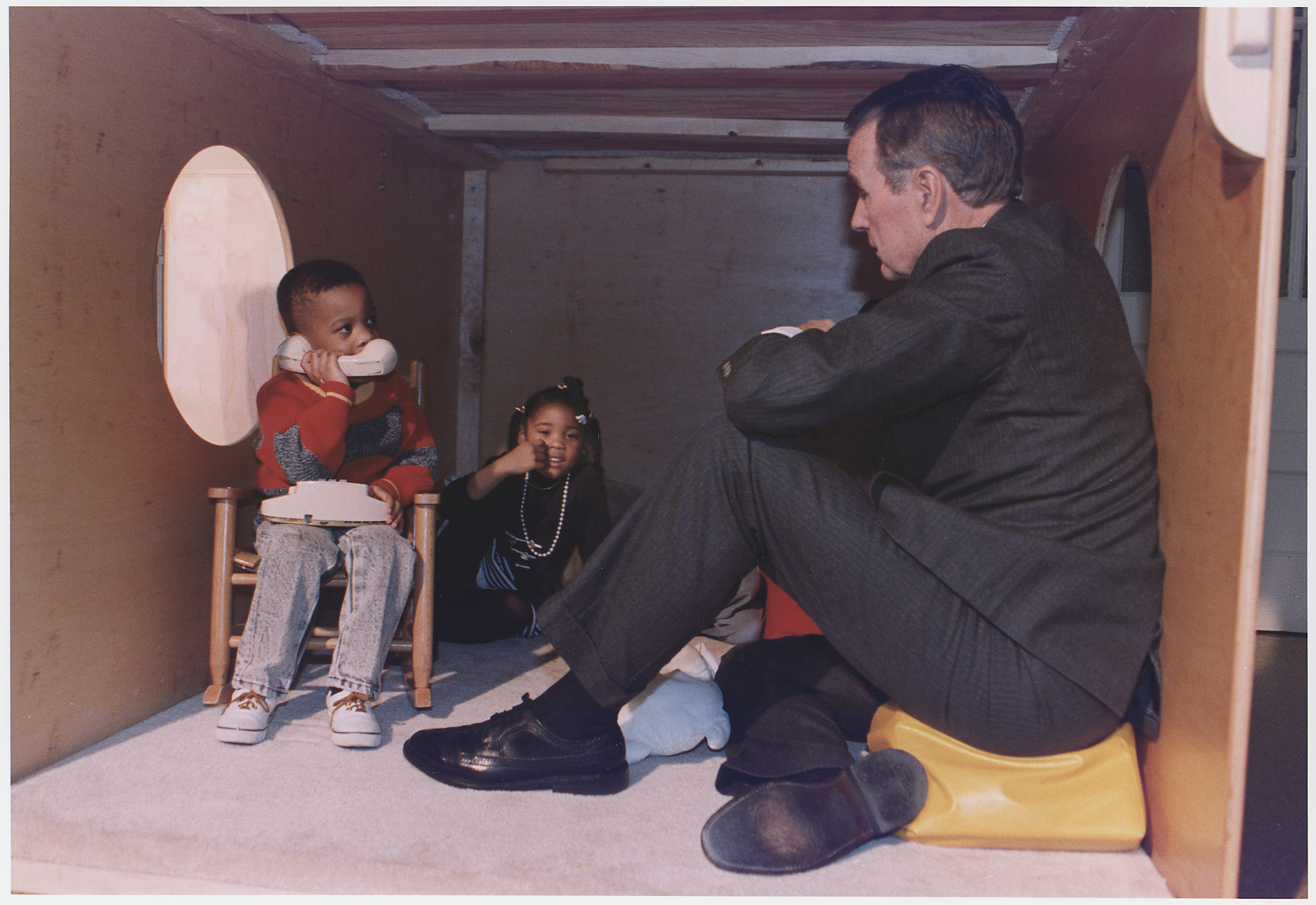
President George H. W. Bush plays with children in a jungle gym at the Emily Harris Head Start Center in Catonsville, 1992.

Residents are zoned to schools in the Baltimore County Public Schools. Catonsville High School, Woodlawn High School (Maryland) (center for science and pre-engineering), and Western School of Technology and Environmental Science, formerly Western Vocational Technical Center, serve the area.

==== Private schools ====
- Mount de Sales Academy is a Catholic all-girls high school in Catonsville.
- Saint Mark School and Parish can be found in Catonsville on Melvin Avenue, just off of Frederick Road.
- Al-Rahmah School is an Islamic school on Johnnycake Road in northern Catonsville

===== Defunct private schools =====
- St. Timothy's Hall, former theological all-boys school on Catonsville

=== Higher education ===
- The University of Maryland, Baltimore County (UMBC) is located in Catonsville.
- The Community College of Baltimore County, formerly known as Catonsville Community College, has a campus in Catonsville across the street from Catonsville High School.

== Attractions ==
=== Arts and entertainment ===
- Earl and Darielle Linehan Concert Hall
- Lurman Woodland Theatre
- Retriever Activities Center

=== Museums ===
- Benjamin Banneker Museum
- Center for Art, Design and Visual Culture at the University of Maryland, Baltimore County
- Spring Grove Hospital Center Alumni Museum

=== Parks and recreation ===
- Catonsville Community Park
- Conservation and Environmental Research Areas of UMBC
- George F.Bragg Nature Study Center and Horticulture Center
- Gliston Park
- Joseph Beuys Sculpture Park
- Benjamin Banneker Historical Park
- Patapsco Valley State Park
- Short Line Railroad Trail
- Trolley Line Number 9 Trail
- Western Hills Community Park (Crosby Park)
- Westview Recreation Area

=== U.S. National Register of Historic Places ===
- Hilton (Catonsville, Maryland)
- Winters Lane Historic District
- Summit Home

== Natives and residents of note ==
- Benjamin Banneker, African-American inventor, scientist and mathematician
- Daniel Berrigan and Philip Berrigan, peace activists
- John Wilkes Booth, actor; assassin of President Abraham Lincoln, attended St. Timothy's Hall, an Episcopal military academy in Catonsville, age 13–14
- William Henry Gorman, businessman who lived in Oak Forest Park from 1897 to 1915
- Charles S. Roberts, known as "The Father of Wargaming"
- James Cardinal Stafford, an American cardinal of the Catholic Church who served as Major Penitentiary of the Apostolic Penitentiary, President of the Pontifical Council for the Laity, Archbishop of Denver, Bishop of Memphis, and Auxiliary Bishop of Baltimore

=== Arts and media ===
- Nan Agle, children's book author
- Louis S. Diggs, Baltimore County historian
- Duff Goldman, star of Food Network's Ace of Cakes, and owner of Charm City Cakes attended University of Maryland Baltimore County
- David Hasselhoff, actor
- Emily Spencer Hayden, photographer
- Elaine Hamilton, abstract expressionist painter
- Mimi Dietrich, author of quilting books and member of Quilters Hall of Fame
- Juliana Luecking, recording artist and filmmaker
- Shelley Puhak, poet
- Kathleen Turner, actor, attended University of Maryland, Baltimore County
- Steve Yeager, filmmaker

=== Music ===
- John Christ, guitarist for the band Danzig
- Greg Kihn, rock musician
- Pat DeMent, lead guitarist for Kix, SR-71, and Cinder Road
- Bill Frisell, jazz guitarist
- Ric Ocasek, lead singer of 1980s band The Cars
- Andy Stack (musician), drummer and keyboardist for the band Wye Oak

=== Sports ===
- Ken Dixon, former pitcher, Baltimore Orioles
- Brian Jozwiak, former West Virginia University lineman, and former professional football player for the National Football League's Kansas City Chiefs
- Adam Kolarek, professional baseball pitcher, Tampa Bay Rays, LA Dodgers, 2020 World Series Champion
- Charlie Maisel, former Major League Baseball player, St. Louis Browns
- Fritz Maisel, known as the "Catonsville Flash," former Major League Baseball player, of the New York Highlanders, now known as the New York Yankees
- George Maisel, former Major League Baseball player, Baltimore Terrapins
- Don Matthews, professional football coach, Canadian Football League, Baltimore Stallions
- John Miller, former pitcher, Baltimore Orioles
- Jeff Nelson, former major league baseball pitcher
- Jalen Robinson, professional soccer player
- Wes Unseld Jr., professional NBA basketball coach
- Wes Unseld, hall of fame NBA basketball player and coach, lived in the Westerlee neighborhood

Vaughn Hebron, NFL, Philadelphia Eagles and Denver Broncos. 2x Super Bowl Champion

== Sports teams ==
- Chesapeake Bayhawks, former professional men's lacrosse team
- Baltimore Tribe, former professional lacrosse team
- Maryland Bays, former professional soccer team
- UMBC Retrievers, collegiate athletic division for the University of Maryland, Baltimore County
- Spring Grove Baseball Club semi-professional baseball team
