= Conservation and Environmental Research Areas of UMBC =

Nature preserve in Baltimore, Maryland, US

Conservation and Environmental Research Areas U of Md-Baltimore County Campus
- Type: Educational trail, Nature reserve
- Location: 5524 Research Park Drive; Baltimore, Maryland
- Area: 50 acres (0.20 km^{2})
- Created: 1997
- Operator: University of Maryland, Baltimore County
- Hiking trails: 2
- Website: umbc.edu/cera

Conservation and Environmental Research Areas (CERA) of University of Maryland, Baltimore County is a nature preserve on the grounds of the UMBC campus in Baltimore, Maryland. The wooded area is located on the southern end of the campus and is bordered by bwtech@UMBC Research and Technology Park to the north, UMBC Boulevard to the west, Selford and Shelbourne Roads to the south, and athletic fields to the east. CERA is used for education purposes for programs at UMBC such as the departments of Geography and Environmental Systems.

== History ==
President Freeman Hrabowski dedicated Conservation and Environmental Research Areas on Earth Day, April 22, 1997, "to further our understanding and appreciation of this natural landscape."

== Description ==
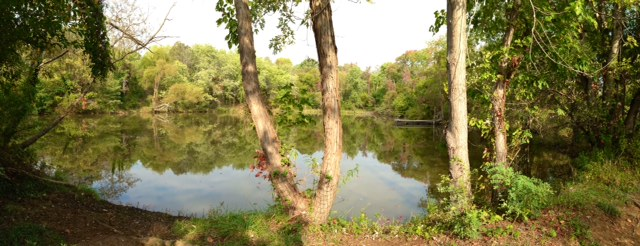
View of Pig Pen Pond in CERA, used for student recreation.

CERA covers about 50 acres of the university landscape, and is located in two different areas. The larger tract, covering approximately 45 acres of the south end of the main campus, contains a wide variety of ecological conditions: mature upland forest, early- and mid- successional forest, and riparian and wetland environments. The second, and much smaller CERA area (about 3 acres), surrounds Pigpen Pond. There are also several areas within CERA where evidence of previous human occupancy and use can be found. In addition to teaching opportunities for faculty, CERA offers a wide range of opportunities for students and faculty to undertake short and long-term research projects in a variety of disciplines.
