= UMBC University Commons =

- The Commons seen from The Quad
- Alternative names: The Commons, Commons

General information
- Location: University of Maryland, Baltimore County Campus, Commons Drive; Baltimore, Maryland 21250
- Opened: 2002
- Operator: Daniel Barnhart (director)
- Transit: MTA 35; Arbutus/Irvington; Catonsville; Downtown A Halethorpe/Satellite

Technical details
- Floor area: 147,000 sq ft (13,700 m^{2})

Design and construction
- Architects: Design Collective, Inc. Perry Dean Rogers & Partners

Website
- campuslife.umbc.edu

The Commons at the University of Maryland, Baltimore County is the central student activities center of the university campus. Opened in 2002, "The Commons" includes meeting rooms, food and retail outlets and a book store. Also incorporated into the building is a gameroom, facilities for the student government association, a campus pub, bank and a copying center. In addition, The Commons hosts numerous events such as Quadmania, Big Crazy Fun Night, orientations, fraternity events, and much more.

== Layout and design ==
The Commons was built on the foundation of the former Gym 1 building. The north–south segment of the building is referred to as "Main Street" for it is where multiple student fairs and events are held, and the east–west segment of the building is referred to as "Market Street" since it transverses the main Food Court.

== Centers and Student Life ==
The Commons includes a variety of student life offices to serve the student body of UMBC. The Campus Information Center (CIC), Center for Off-Campus Student Services (OCSS), the Student Events Board (seb), Student Government Association (SGA), the Mosaic Center, and the Women's Center are all located in The Commons.

== Shopping ==
The Commons provides the majority of shopping and eatery options for the campus, along with the University Center's Starbucks and Chick-fil-A in the University Center.

=== Bookstore ===
The official UMBC bookstore is housed on the first floor of The Commons. Established in 1966, the bookstore is a non-profit, non-state funded, self-support, auxiliary, retail operation owned and operated by UMBC. The store sells a wide range of items ranging from apparel to electronics.

On the ground floor of the bookstore, the Yum Shoppe serves as a convenience store for the students and faculty on the campus.

=== Dining ===
The Commons contains numerous eateries along and above "Market Street". They include: Halal Shack, Piccola Italia, Wild Greens, Sushi Do, Copperhead Jacks, Retriever Market, Yella's, Blends and Bowls, Jerk + Lime, and Indian Kitchen . Other establishments include Dunkin’ Donuts on the ground floor and The Skylight Room on the third floor.

== Future plans ==
According to the 2009 Master Plan, plans call for another student center entitled the "Student Life Building". This building is proposed to be located to the north of The Commons along Erickson Field. This building will add additional student space, as well as reinforce the student core of the campus.
