= Halethorpe station =

Railway station in Halethorpe, Maryland

Halethorpe
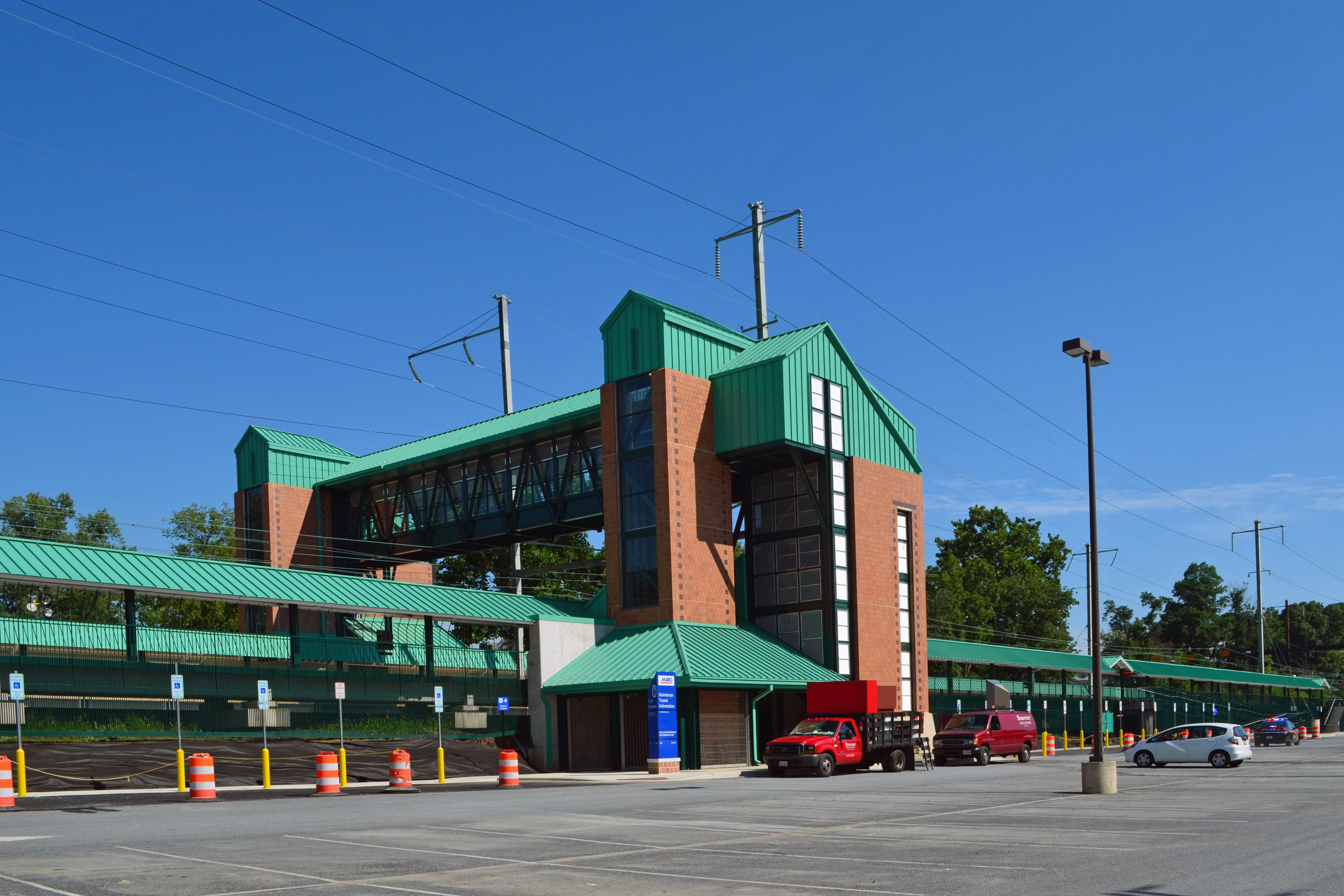
- Halethorpe station in August 2013

General information
- Location: 5833 Southwestern Boulevard; Halethorpe, Maryland
- Coordinates: 39°14′13.4″N 76°41′28.8″W
- Owner: Maryland Transit Administration
- Line: Amtrak Northeast Corridor
- Platforms: 2 side platforms
- Tracks: 4
- Connections: MTA BaltimoreLink: 32; UMBC Transit: Arbutus Line

Construction
- Parking: 770 spaces
- Accessible: Yes

History
- Rebuilt: 2013
- Electrified: 1935

Passengers
- 2018: 1,517 daily ▲19.7%

Services
Preceding station	MARC	Following station
BWI Airport toward Union Station	Penn Line	West Baltimore toward Perryville
Former services
Preceding station	Pennsylvania Railroad	Following station
Patapsco toward Washington, D.C.	Philadelphia, Wilmington and Baltimore Railroad	Arbutus toward Philadelphia
Location

Halethorpe station is a passenger rail station located in the unincorporated community of Halethorpe, Maryland, on the Northeast Corridor. MARC Penn Line trains serve the station; Amtrak trains pass through but do not stop.

Halethorpe station is located along Southwestern Boulevard (US 1) beneath a bridge for Francis Avenue, which also contains a staircase leading between the station and the bridge. A long parking lot between US 1 and the railroad tracks spans from north of the Washington Boulevard interchange to south of Tom Day Boulevard. South of Halethorpe, the Penn Line crosses under the MARC Camden Line east of the St. Denis station. The vicinity is considered an excellent spot for railfanning due to its proximity to Baltimore and its location at a point that sees CSX Capital Subdivision, Baltimore Terminal Subdivision, and Old Main Line Subdivision freight traffic.

The station serves the University of Maryland Baltimore County two miles away. UMBC's Halethorpe/Satellite Transit Line provides a bus connection from the campus to the station. Additional communities include Arbutus, Catonsville, and Violetville.

== History ==
A new accessible-accessible station with a high platform and a pedestrian bridge was completed on August 12, 2013. The station has two new 700-foot-long platforms with canopies, a pedestrian bridge, new stairs and elevator towers, a ticket area and restrooms.

Governor Martin O'Malley dedicated the station to the late Del. James E. "Ned" Malone Sr., father of then-current delegate James E. "Jimmy" Malone Jr.

== Station layout ==
The tracks are numbered in accordance with the former Pennsylvania Railroad's convention of retaining track numbers relative to their position in a four-track main line, with tracks adjacent to "Track 1" using successive letters beginning with "Track A." Track A splits from Track 1 just South of the station and continues to just North of West Baltimore, the following station heading North.
