= Oaklee, Baltimore =

Oaklee
- neighborhood statistical area
- Location within Baltimore
- Coordinates: 39.268°N 76.685°W
- Country: United States
- State: Maryland
- City: Baltimore

Area
  - Total: 0.056 sq mi (0.15 km^{2})
  - Land: 0.056 sq mi (0.15 km^{2})
  - Water: 0 sq mi (0 km^{2})
- Elevation: 180 ft (55 m)

Population
  - Estimate (2009): 763
- Time zone: UTC-5 (Eastern)
  - Summer (DST): UTC-4 (EDT)
- ZIP code: 21229
- Area code: 410, 443, and 667

Oaklee is a neighborhood in the Southwest District of Baltimore, located at the city's edge between the neighborhoods of Irvington and Violetville. Its boundaries are triangle-shaped, with the Baltimore County line forming its southwestern base. From the triangle's apex to the northeast, U.S. Route 1 branches off from Wilkens Avenue to form the neighborhood's southeastern boundary, while Wilkens draws its northwestern edge from the apex to the base.

== Public transportation ==
MTA LocalLink 56 provides bus service to Oaklee along Wilkens Avenue as it travels between White Marsh Mall and UMBC.

The UMBC shuttle bus stops nearby at the intersection of Leeds Avenue and Colchester Road.
