= University of Maryland, Baltimore County Centers and Institutes =

UMBC Office of Research
- Type: Public
- Established: 1966
- Dean: Karl V. Steiner
- Location: Baltimore, Maryland, United States

The University of Maryland, Baltimore County (UMBC) features a variety of research centers and institutes both based on the campus and affiliated with other academic institutions. These centers and institutes listed below seek out to expand their research, educate, and promote partnerships between the university and the Baltimore-Washington Metropolitan Area and beyond.

== Research centers ==
=== Alex. Brown Center for Entrepreneurship ===
The Alex. Brown Center for Entrepreneurship was established in Spring 2000 through a donation of $1 million from The Alex. Brown Foundation. The Brown Center hosts two major events at UMBC: : The Cangialosi Business Innovation Competition in the spring, and UMBC's Idea Competition in the fall. The center administers an Entrepreneurship Minor as well as other academic services.

=== Center for Advanced Sensor Technology ===
The Center for Advanced Sensor Technology derived from faculty of the University of Maryland Biotechnology Institute. CAST focuses on the development of sensing technologies: the chemistries, methods, systems and devices used in measuring various substances of interest to biotechnology, medicine, the environment, and homeland security.

=== Center for Advanced Studies in Photonics Research ===
The Center for Advanced Studies in Photonics Research (CASPR) fosters advanced photonics research and technology development in the areas of optical communications, optical sensing and devices, nanophotonics, biophotonics, and quantum optics in order to benefit government, industry and scientific progress.

=== Center for Art, Design & Visual Culture ===
The Center for Art, Design and Visual Culture (CADVC) was established in 1989 as the Fine Art Gallery at the University of Maryland, Baltimore County. The center is the university's prime exhibition location where students, professors, staff and the public can experience visual culture along with cultural and aesthetic issues.

=== Center for Space Science and Technology ===
UMBC has several centers and institutes that work with NASA at the Goddard Space Flight Center in Greenbelt, Maryland

The Center for Space Sciences and Technology (CSST) is the administrative unit for the university's participation in the CRESST (Center for Research and Exploration in Space Science & Technology) consortium with NASA's Goddard Space Flight Center. The University of Maryland College Park (UMCP) and the Universities Space Research Association (USRA) are partners in the center's consortium.

=== Center for Urban Environmental Research & Education ===
The Center for Urban Environmental Research and Education (CUERE) was created in 2001 with support from the Environmental Protection Agency and the U.S. Department of Housing and Urban Development. The facility is located in the Technology Research Center on the campus of the University of Maryland, Baltimore County in Baltimore, Maryland, allowing for opportunities for UMBC students and faculty. The center's focus is primarily on the relationship between natural and socioeconomic processes that occur in urban environments. CUERE's location allows for ample research opportunities in the Baltimore-Washington metropolitan area.

=== Center for Women in Technology ===
The Center for Women In Technology (CWIT) was established at the University of Maryland, Baltimore County in July 1998 to provide leadership in achieving women's full participation in all aspects of information technology. The center's original name was the "Center for Women and Information Technology", and it was founded to encourage women as both developers of information technology and to women's experiences as users of IT. The original CWIT site included a large number of resources and links and served as a clearinghouse about women and information technology. This work included focusing on K-12 education as well as supporting university students, and work force advancement and retention.

=== Dresher Center for the Humanities ===
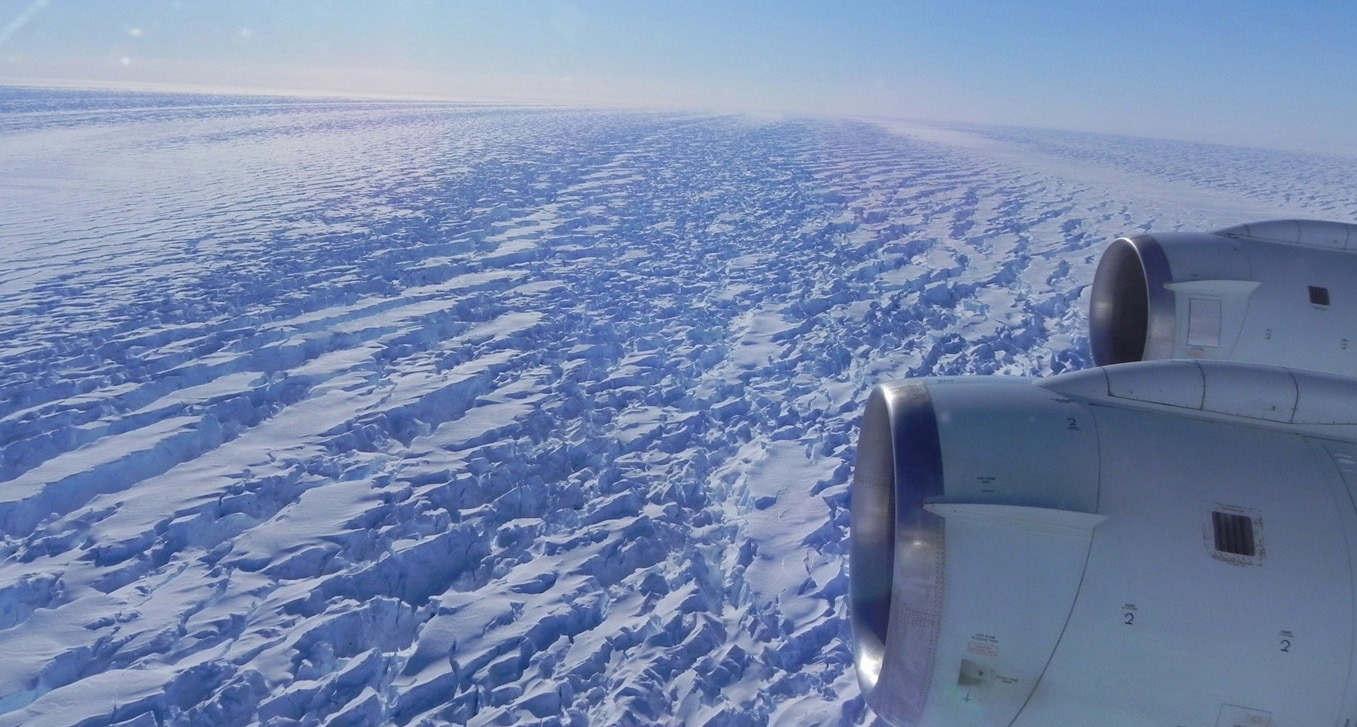
A photograph of an ice stream of Recovery Glacier taken on a Joint Center for Earth Systems Technology mission with NASA

The James T. and Virginia M. Dresher Center for the Humanities promotes interdisciplinary research and scholarship in the humanities among faculty, students and visiting scholars at the University of Maryland, Baltimore County. Founded in 1996, the Dresher Foundation has expanded its research mission in order to bring national attention to UMBC's impressive achievements in the humanities.

=== Goddard Earth Sciences and Technology Center ===
The Goddard Earth Sciences and Technology Center (GEST) was created in 2000 when NASA Goddard Space Flight Center (GSFC) awarded a Cooperative Agreement to the University of Maryland, Baltimore County, to create a center of excellence in the Earth sciences. The center works with a variety of partners such as Hampton University, Howard University, Caelum Research Corporation, and Northrop Grumman Corporation in order to develop collaborative research programs in all areas of the Earth sciences.

=== Imaging Research Center ===
Founded in 1984 by Stan VanDerBeek as the Image Lab, the Imaging Research Center (IRC) is an interdisciplinary hub that fosters collaboration among UMBC faculty, researchers, fellows, and students across all disciplines. Emerging from an expanded definition of the visual arts, the IRC advances research through innovative media, emerging technologies, and curious collaboration. Its projects span 3D visualization, immersive technologies, interactive installations, feature-length films, social media, software, and mobile applications, producing original and innovative solutions that reflect the contemporary moment and serve the public good.

=== Joint Center for Earth Systems Technology ===
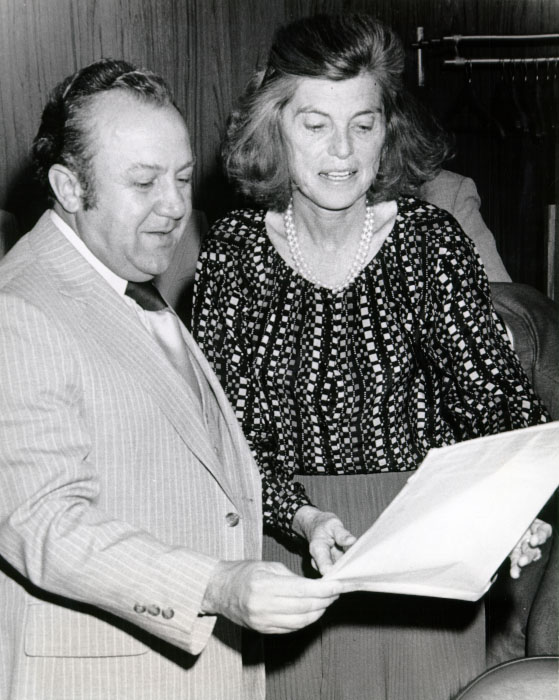
The Shriver Center was named for Former Ambassador to France, Sargent Shriver and his wife, philanthropist and activist, Eunice Kennedy Shriver (pictured right).

The Joint Center for Earth Systems Technology (JCET) operates under a cooperative agreement between the University of Maryland, Baltimore County and the NASA Goddard Space Flight Center (GSFC). The center partners with Goddard to develop new technology for environmental remote sensing.

=== Eunice Kennedy and Sargent Shriver Center ===
The Shriver Center was created in December 1993 in honor of the life‚ work of Eunice Kennedy Shriver and Sargent Shriver in order to focus in an integrated way, the resources of the colleges and universities of Greater Baltimore on pressing urban issues of the region. The center works alongside the Career Services Center as a hub for student career development related to internships, co-ops, and research opportunities. Other features include the Shriver Peaceworkers Fellow Program, service learning, scholar programs, scholarships, and career counseling.

=== UMBC Center for Artificial Intelligence ===
The UMBC Center for Artificial Intelligence is an interdisciplinary center established in 2024 to help support and promote faculty, staff, and students in research and education in all areas of Artificial Intelligence. It includes more than 70 faculty members with research interests in AI and related areas, including robotics, machine learning, data science, image processing, and natural language understanding. These faculty members work in over 30 laboratories and research centers and teach many AI-related courses across departments and disciplines.

== Institutes ==
=== Cybersecurity Institute ===
The UMBC Cybersecurity Institute provides unified academic and research leadership, partnership, innovation, and public outreach in this critical discipline. Its interests in cybersecurity are not just technical but also include the field's social, behavioral, operational, and economic elements. The institute's leadership and UMBC’s cybersecurity faculty are actively engaged with government, industry, and academic organizations and individuals and remain fully informed on the current state of cybersecurity education, research, and operational workforce issues related to the cyber domain. Undergraduate students majoring in computer science, computer engineering, information systems, math, or related fields can add cybersecurity expertise to their degree programs via a cybersecurity track or concentration Graduate students can pursue an M.S. in cybersecurity or graduate certificates through UMBC’s Cybersecurity Graduate Program.

=== Goddard Planetary Heliophysics Institute ===
Founded in May 2011, the NASA Goddard Space Flight Center (GSFC) awarded a Cooperative Agreement to the University of Maryland, Baltimore County, to create a science center for collaborative research in Solar-Planetary Sciences at NASA's Goddard Space Flight Center. UMBC partners with the University of Maryland College Park and American University in an effort to develop collaborative research programs in all areas of the Heliophysics sciences.

=== The Hilltop Institute ===
The Hilltop Institute at UMBC is a nonpartisan research organization dedicated to improving the health and wellbeing of people and communities. Hilltop conducts cutting-edge data analytics and translational research on behalf of government agencies, foundations, and nonprofit organizations to inform public policy at the national, state, and local levels.

=== Howard Hughes Medical Institute ===
The Howard Hughes Medical Institute at University of Maryland, Baltimore County is engaged in the research on application of nuclear magnetic resonance (NMR) to studies of the structure and function of proteins and macromolecular interactions.

=== Institute of Fluorescence ===
The Institute of Fluorescence was founded in 2001 by Dr. Chris D. Geddes of the University of Maryland, Baltimore County. Approaches and concepts both developed and discovered by the group, such as Metal-Enhanced Fluorescence (MEF), Metal-Enhanced Chemiluminescence (MEC), Surface-Plasmon Coupled Phenomenon and the glucose-sensing contact lens, are both well-recognized, highly cited and currently used in laboratories around the world today.

=== Maryland Institute for Policy Analysis & Research ===
The Maryland Institute for Policy Analysis and Research (MIPAR) is the main center for social science and public policy research at UMBC. The center links the analytical resources of the university with policymakers in Maryland and the Baltimore region, conducting opinion research, policy analyses, and program evaluations on a variety of topics. MIPAR also administers the Center for Aging Studies at UMBC.

== See also ==
- University of Maryland, Baltimore County Scholars
