= UMBC Transit =

University of Maryland, Baltimore County, bus system

- Parent: University of Maryland, Baltimore County (UMBC)
- Founded: 1977
- Headquarters: 1000 Hilltop Circle
- Locale: Baltimore, Maryland
- Service area: Baltimore City; Anne Arundel County; Baltimore County
- Service type: Bus service
- Routes: 7
- Hubs: Administration; Commons Drive/Park Road; Hilltop Circle/Poplar Avenue
- Depots: UMBC Facilities Management 39°15′09″N 76°42′18″W
- Fuel type: Hybrid
- Chief executive: Daniel Teage
- Website: UMBC Transit

UMBC Transit is the official bus system of the University of Maryland, Baltimore County. Along with the Maryland Transit Administration (MTA), the UMBC community has public transit access to nearby areas such as Catonsville, Arbutus, Maryland, and Baltimore City.

The system has several bus shuttle lines that are available to UMBC's students, faculty, and staff. All are free by showing of one's campus identification card.

== Lines ==
The university's transit system has seven lines:

- Arbutus/Irvington Line: Serving the Arbutus & Irvington Communities
- Arundel Mills/Light Rail Line: Serving the nearby Arundel Mills Mall & BWI Light Rail Station
- BWI/MARC Line: Providing access to the BWI / MARC Train Station
- Catonsville Line: Serving the Catonsville Community (Frederick Road Business District) and CCBC Catonsville bus stop on Rolling Road
- Downtown Line: Connecting the UMBC campus to the University of Maryland, Baltimore (UMB) campus, University of Maryland Medical Center, and Lexington Market in Downtown Baltimore.
- Halethorpe/Satellite Line: Serving the Halethorpe Train Station, South Campus Satellite Lot, and Main Campus
- Route 40/Rolling Road Line: Providing connection to the U.S. Route 40 Business District

== History ==
In 1977, the university launched what is now known today as UMBC Transit as UMBC Shuttle. Originally a simple single-van service, the shuttle was operated by the Residential Life Office and staffed by part-time undergraduate students. The original route transported graduate students to what is now known as the Charlestown Retirement Community located off of Maiden Choice Lane in Catonsville.

As the university continued to grow, the Commuting Students Association, elected to have a department established to specifically focus on developing services designed to address the transportation needs of commuting students at UMBC. As a result, the Office of Commuter Affairs was established. In addition to the regular shuttle service, a charter operation was established to provide fee-based trips off-campus in an effort to further support expansion and also to provide broader educational opportunities for the UMBC community. In the late 1980s, UMBC Shuttle became independent of the Office of Commuter Affairs, focusing specifically on transportation needs only and reporting to the University Center.

As of 2004, the system has been rebranded as UMBC Transit. Recent developments include the addition of new routes and replacing existing bus stop shelters on campus with modern "green" solar powered units. Today, the fleet is composed of state-of-the-art transit buses. Recently, UMBC Transit launched Transit Tracker, a real-time, GPS driven application, providing riders with convenient up-to-the-minute access of current shuttle bus locations from any web accessible computer or mobile device.

In August 2014, service has expanded to a new line that connect the campus to Downtown Baltimore. This line (Downtown) also connects the campus to the Baltimore Metro Subway by way of Lexington Market Station. The Downtown Line connects to the Metro as well as MARC Train at Camden Station, and the Baltimore Light Rail by way of Convention Center Station.

== Nearby transit connections ==
- Halethorpe (MARC station)
- BWI Rail Station
- BWI Business District (Baltimore Light Rail station)
- Patapsco (Baltimore Light Rail station)
