= UMBC College of Arts, Humanities and Social Sciences =

Coordinates: 39.25509°N 76.71365°W

College of Arts, Humanities and Social Sciences University of Maryland, Baltimore County
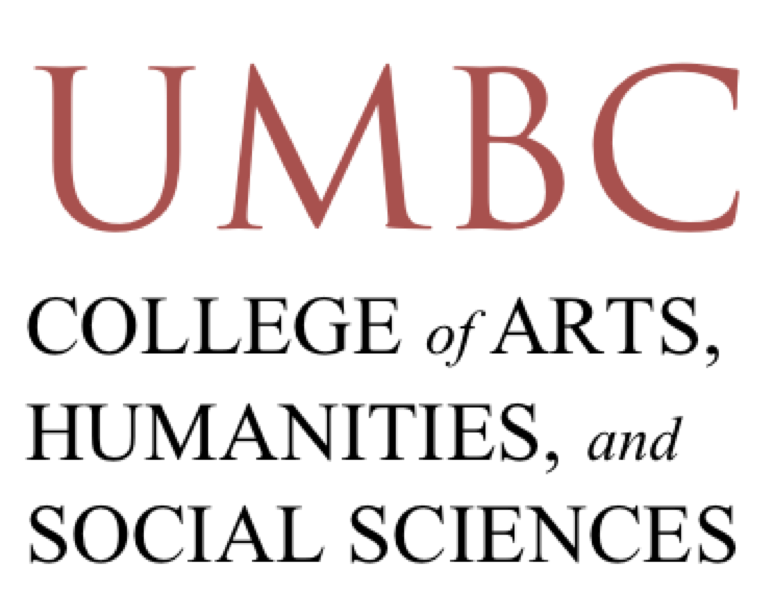
- Type: Public
- Established: 1966
- Dean: Scott E. Casper
- Location: Baltimore, Maryland, United States
- Website: Official site

The College of Arts, Humanities and Social Sciences at the University of Maryland, Baltimore County (CAHSS) has 22 departments, and offers 30 Bachelor's, 16 Master's, and 6 Ph.D. programs. The college also includes several scholarship programs; the Linehan Artist Scholars Program, the Humanities Scholars Program, and the Sondheim Public Affairs Scholars Program. The college oversees several centers; the Dresher Center for Humanities, the Imaging Research Center, and the Maryland Institute for Policy Analysis and Research.

In July 2013, Scott E. Casper became dean the College of Arts, Humanities and Social Sciences. Casper was the interim dean of the College of Liberal Arts at the University of Nevada, Reno. Casper's area of speciality is history.

== Research and awards ==
Faculty members of CAHSS have won fellowships, awards and research grants from such organizations as the National Endowment for the Humanities, the National Endowment for the Arts, the National Institutes of Health, the National Science Foundation, and the Guggenheim Foundation and the Fulbright Program. Some recent examples include a $1.4 million grant from NIH to the Center for Aging Studies for diabetes research, and a $1.8 million grant from the National Science Foundation for the university's geography and environmental science faculty to develop an online infrastructure for scientists who study land change.

The National Endowment for the Humanities has supported “For All the World to See: Visual Culture and the Struggle for Civil Rights,” a signature exhibit of the Center for Art, Design and Visual Culture. The full exhibit was featured at the Smithsonian Institution and four other museums, and a version of it is traveling to dozens of locations across the country as part of NEH on the Road.

== Departments & Programs ==
- Africana Studies
- American Studies
- Ancient Studies
- Asian Studies
- Dance
- Economics
- Education
- Emergency Health Services
- English
- Gender and Women's Studies
- Geography and Environmental Systems
- Global Studies
- History
- Judaic Studies
- Language, Literacy and Culture
- Media and Communication Studies
- Modern Languages and Linguistics
- Music
- Philosophy
- Political Science
- Psychology
- Public Policy
- Sociology, Anthropology, and Public Health
- Public Policy
- Theatre
- Visual Arts
