= UMBC College of Natural and Mathematical Sciences =

Undergraduate and graduate college at the University of Maryland, Baltimore County

Coordinates: 38.9870°N 76.9410°W

College of Natural and Mathematical Sciences University of Maryland, Baltimore County
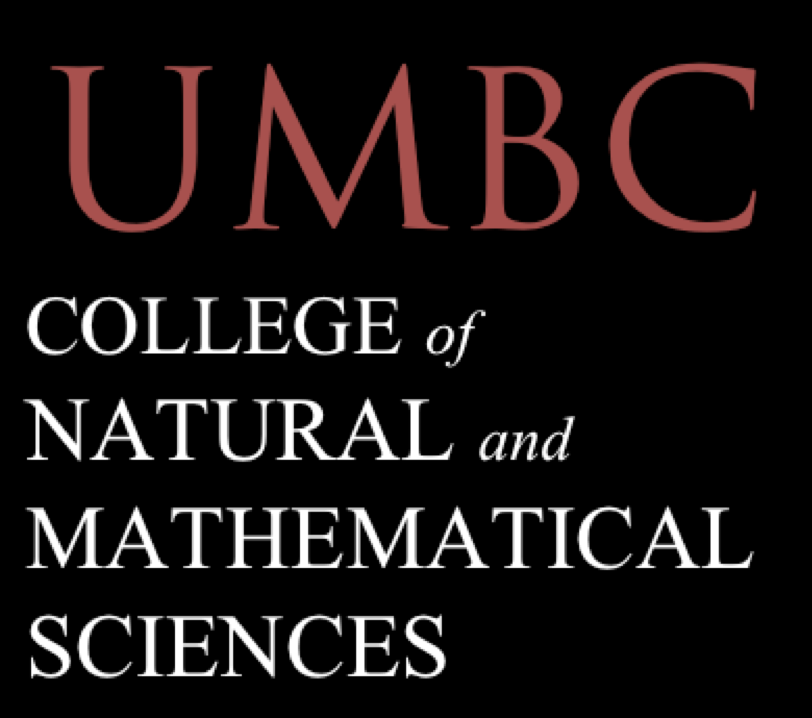
- Type: Public
- Established: 1966
- Dean: William LaCourse
- Location: Baltimore, Maryland, United States

The University of Maryland, Baltimore County College of Natural and Mathematical Sciences focuses in the areas of life science, including Biology, Chemistry, Biochemistry, Mathematics, Statistics, Marine Biology, and Physics.

== Departments ==
- Biological Sciences
- Chemistry and Biochemistry
- Mathematics and Statistics
- Marine Biotechnology
- Physics

== Centers and Institutes ==
- Center for Space Science and Technology (CSST)
- Institute of Fluorescence
- Joint Center for Earth Systems Technology (JCET)
- Goddard Earth Sciences and Technology Center (GEST)
- Center for Advanced Study of Photonics Research (CASPR)
- Joint Center for Astrophysics (JCA)
