= Bwtech@UMBC Research and Technology Park =

Research park in Baltimore, Maryland, US

Coordinates: 39.24980°N 76.71235°W

bwtech@UMBC Research and Technology Park
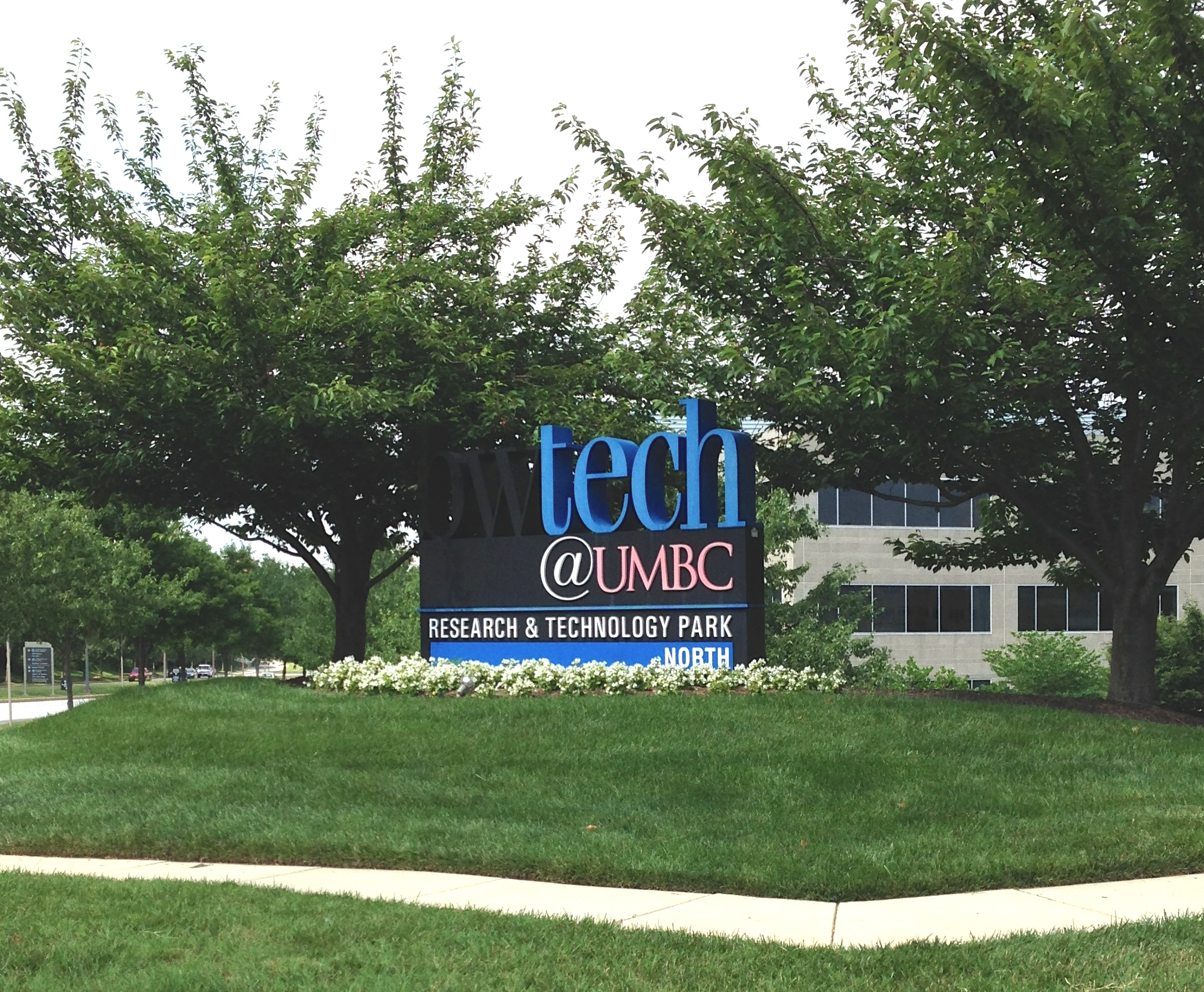

bwtech@UMBC Research and Technology Park
- 5523 Research Park Drive; Baltimore, Maryland, USA 21228

Information
- Established: 1991
- Area: 350,000 sq-ft 71 acres
- Companies: 90+
- Structures: 8
- Website: Official Site

Bwtech@UMBC Research and Technology Park is the university research park for the University of Maryland, Baltimore County in Baltimore, Maryland. The research park has two campuses; bwtech@UMBC North, located just south of the main campus and adjacent to the campus gateway, and bwtech@UMBC South, located in UMBC's South Campus complex off of Rolling Road.

== History ==
Bwtech@UMBC was established as the first university research park in the entire state of Maryland, in 1991. The research park has grown considerably since then by expanding the North campus to include several new buildings.

== Programs ==
Bwtech@UMBC focuses on four main areas; clean energy, cyber security, life sciences, and training programs. For clean energy, the research park houses the Maryland Clean Energy Technology Incubator (CETI). For cyber security, the research park includes a variety of programs such as the Cyber Incubator, which utilizes the park's HUBZone status, Cync program with Northrop Grumman, CyberHive for government, military, and commercial interactions between cyber security companies, and CyberMap.
