= Freeman A. Hrabowski III =

American academic administrator (born 1950)

Freeman Hrabowski
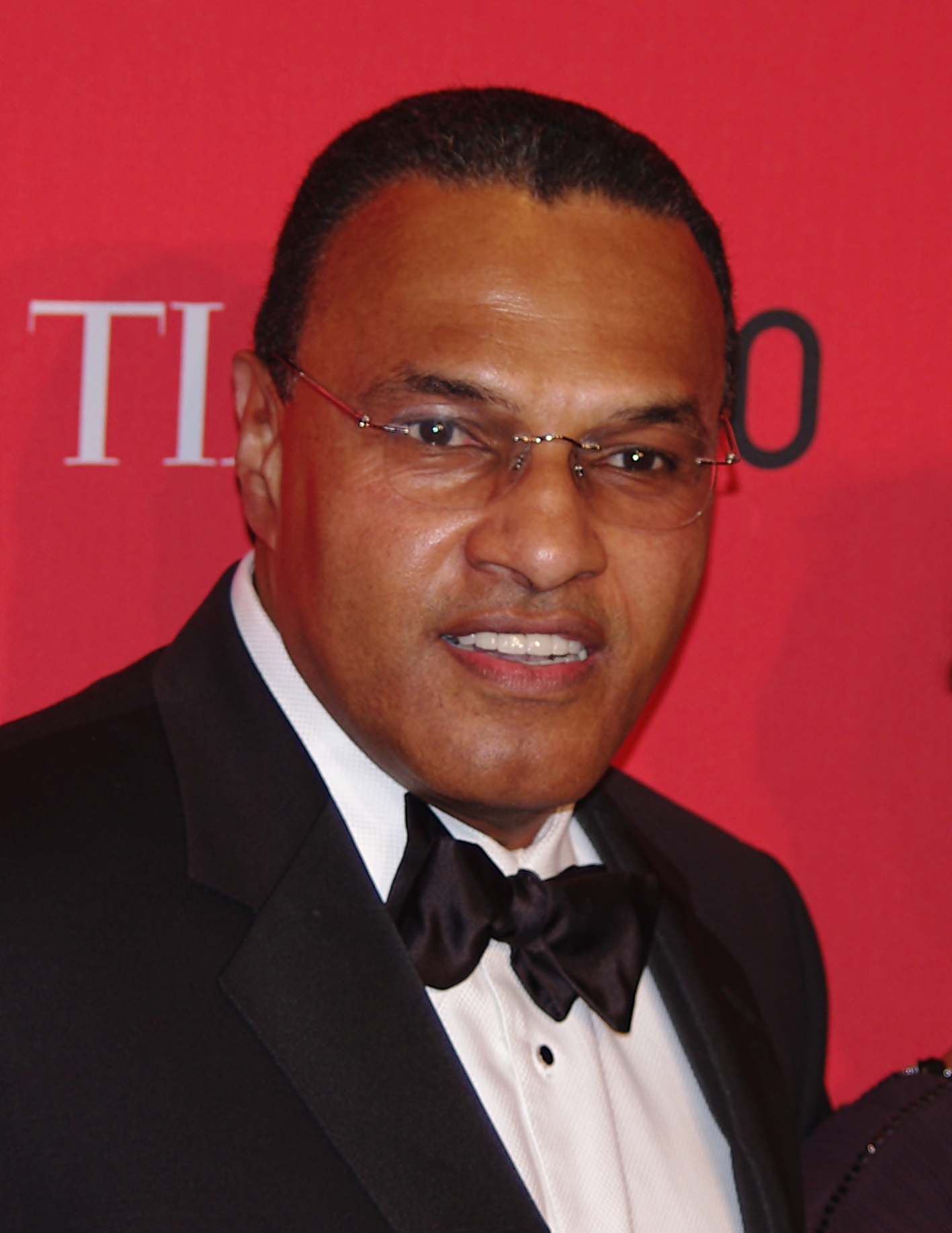

President of University of Maryland, Baltimore County
- In office 1992–2022
- Preceded by: Michael Hooker
- Succeeded by: Valerie Ashby

Personal details
- Born: Freeman Alphonsa Hrabowski III; August 13, 1950 (age 76) Birmingham, Alabama, U.S.
- Spouse: Jackie Coleman
- Children: 1
- Education: Hampton University (BA); University of Illinois Urbana-Champaign (MA, PhD)

Freeman Alphonsa Hrabowski III (born August 13, 1950) is an American educator, advocate, and mathematician. In May 1992, he began his term as president of the University of Maryland, Baltimore County (UMBC), one of the twelve public universities composing the University System of Maryland. Hrabowski has been credited with transforming UMBC into an institution noted for research and innovation.

Hrabowski chaired the National Academies committee that produced the report Expanding Underrepresented Minority Participation: America's Science and Technology Talent at the Crossroads. In 2012, President Barack Obama appointed Hrabowski to chair of the newly created President's Advisory Commission on Educational Excellence for African Americans. Publications have named him one of America's best leaders, one of the 100 most influential people in the world, and one of America's 10 best college presidents.

In 2011, Hrabowski received the Carnegie Corporation of New York's Academic Leadership Award, one of the highest honors given to an educator.

== Early life and education ==
Hrabowski was born in segregated Birmingham, Alabama, the only child of his parents, both of whom were educators. His mother was an English teacher who became a math teacher, and his father was a math teacher who went to work at a steel mill.

Frequently asked about the origin of his unusual surname, Hrabowski explains that he is the great-great-grandson of Eaton Hrabowski, who was enslaved and renamed for Polish-American slave owner Samuel Hrabowski. In a CBS television interview, Hrabowski recounted that he is the third Freeman Hrabowski; his grandfather was the first Freeman Hrabowski born a free man, as opposed to having to be freed.

When he was 12 years old, in 1963, Hrabowski saw his friends readying for the Children's Crusade march for civil rights. He convinced his parents to let him join in as a youth advocate, but soon into the march he was swept up in a mass arrest. Birmingham's notorious Public Safety Commissioner Eugene "Bull" Connor spat in his face and arrested him.

When he was 19 years old, Hrabowski graduated from Hampton Institute with high honors in mathematics. During his matriculation there he spent a year abroad at The American University in Cairo in Cairo, Egypt. At the University of Illinois Urbana-Champaign, he received his MA in mathematics and four years later his PhD in higher education administration and statistics.

== Career at University of Maryland, Baltimore County ==
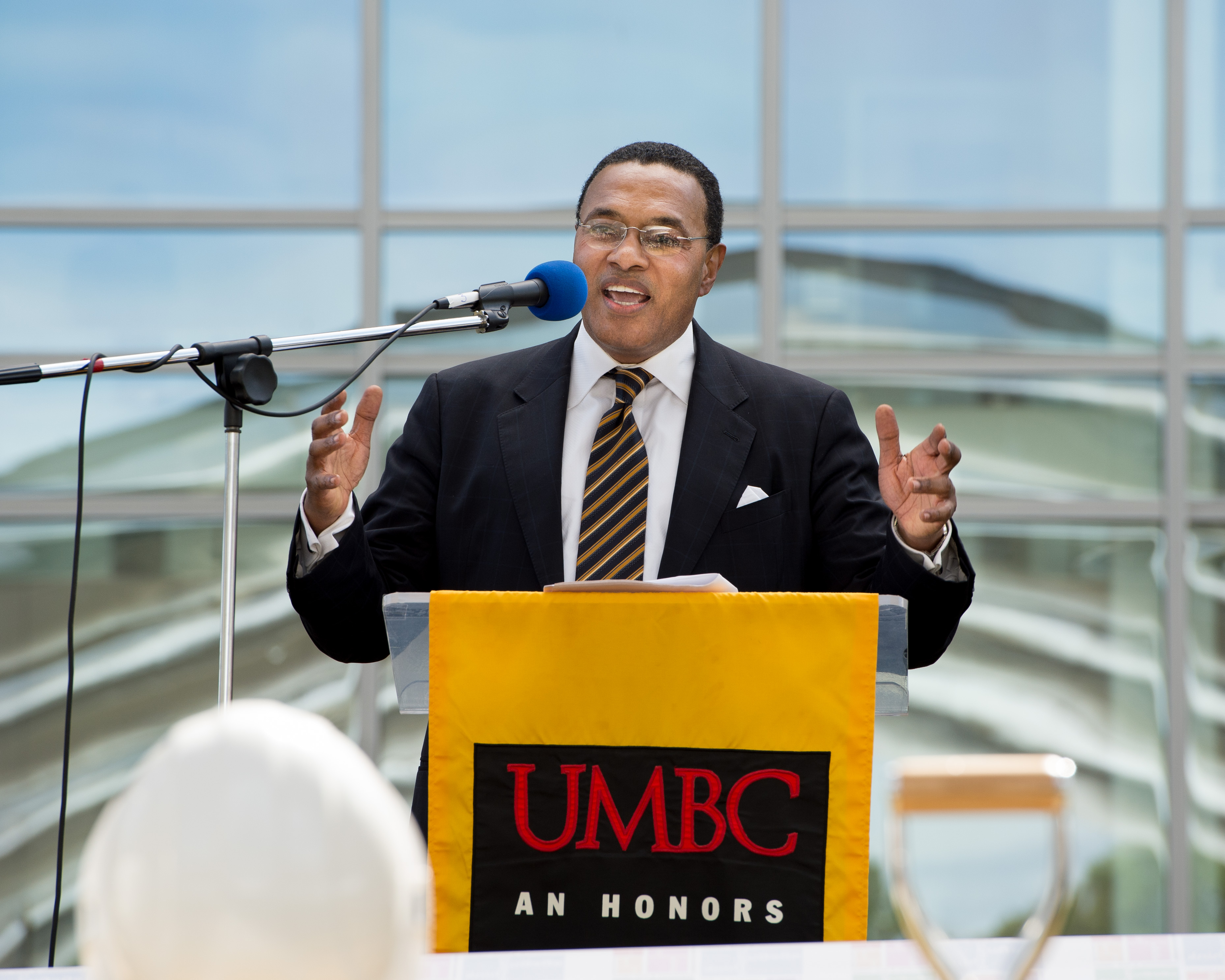
Freeman Hrabowski at the opening of the Performing Arts & Humanities Building at the University of Maryland, Baltimore County

UMBC was a relatively young school in a Baltimore suburb when Hrabowski arrived in 1987 as vice provost, then executive vice president, and president in 1992.

Over nearly three decades as president of UMBC, Hrabowski gained a high public profile. Hrabowski emphasized STEM education, and co-founded the Meyerhoff Scholars Program, aimed at promoting minority achievement in STEM fields. Under his leadership, "more black students earn bachelor's degrees in science and technology from UMBC than from any other non-historically black university in Maryland, even College Park, which has three times as many students." Hrabowski was an advisor to President Barack Obama on higher education policy, and was appointed by Obama to serve as chair of an advisory council on excellence in African-American education. He received an honorary doctorate from Harvard University in 2010. Hrabowski retired from UMBC in 2022.

== Awards and honors ==
Hrabowski has received, among other awards:

- National Academy of Public Administration: Elected Fellow, 2021.
- Membership to the American Philosophical Society
- 18th Annual Heinz Award in the Human Condition category
- University of California, San Francisco Medal – 2020
- Black History Month 2017 Honoree, Mathematically Gifted & Black
- Viktor Hamburger Outstanding Educator Award from the Society for Developmental Biology, 2017.
