= Center for Urban Environmental Research and Education =

US research institute

The Center for Urban Environmental Research and Education (CUERE) is located at the University of Maryland, Baltimore County (UMBC) in Catonsville, Maryland. The center's focus is primarily on the relationship between natural and socioeconomic processes that occur in urban environments.

== Facility ==
The Center for Urban Environmental Research and Education was established in 2001 with support from the U.S. Environmental Protection Agency and the U.S. Department of Housing and Urban Development. The facility is located in the Technology Research Center on the UMBC campus, allowing for ample research opportunities in the Baltimore-Washington metropolitan area. CUERE's stated mission is "to advance the understanding of the environmental, social and economic consequences of the transformation of the urban landscape through research, conferences and symposia, support of university teaching programs and assistance to K-12 education."

The CUERE offers a wide variety of resources for its researching purposes. The Technology Research Center on Linden Avenue on the southeastern portion of the UMBC campus offers a Geographic Information Systems laboratory, and an environmental research laboratory. The environmental research laboratory specializes in water chemistry and quality analysis, soil physical properties analysis, soil chemical properties analysis, and soil sample processing for external analysis.

In addition to the amenities in the Technology Research Center, the Conservation and Environmental Research Area (CERA) provides researchers, faculty, and students with an on-campus natural area for observation and experimentation. CERA comprises 45 acres of UMBC's southern campus.

== Collaborators ==
Organizations that work on research projects with CUERE include:

- Cary Institute of Ecosystem Studies, Millbrook, New York
- US Forest Service, Baltimore Field Station
- US Geological Survey, Maryland-Delaware-District of Columbia Water Science Center (Catonsville, MD).

== Research projects ==
CUERE began its Baltimore Ecosystem Study in 1998, focusing on surface water and groundwater in the Baltimore area. The project has been led by the Cary Institute and funded by the National Science Foundation. The project collected and analyzed water data for over 20 years, and is one of the first projects to study urban ecosystems, rather than natural areas.
