= University of Maryland, Baltimore County =

Public university in Catonsville, Maryland, U.S.

- Motto: An Honors University in Maryland
- Type: Public research university
- Established: 1966; 60 years ago
- Parent institution: University System of Maryland
- Academic affiliations: ORAU; Space-grant
- Endowment: $179.1 million (2025)
- Budget: $691.1 million (2025)
- President: Valerie Ashby
- Provost: Manfred H. M. van Dulmen
- Faculty: Full-Time: 594; Part-Time: 391
- Administrative staff: 1,288 (2013)
- Students: 13,530 (Fall 2025)
- Undergraduates: 11,087
- Postgraduates: 2,443
- Location: Catonsville, Maryland, United States; 39°15′19.80″N 76°42′40.52″W
- Campus: Suburban, 500 acres (2.0 km^{2})
- Colors: Black, Gold, Red, White
- Nickname: Retrievers
- Sporting affiliations: NCAA Division I America East Conference
- Mascot: True Grit the Retriever
- Website: umbc.edu

The University of Maryland, Baltimore County (UMBC) is a public research university in Catonsville, Maryland, United States. It had a fall 2025 enrollment of 13,530 students. In 2019, it had 61 undergraduate majors, over 92 graduate programs (38 master, 25 doctoral, and 29 graduate certificate programs) and the first university research park in Maryland. It is classified among "R1: Doctoral Universities – Very High Research Activity".

Established as a part of the University System of Maryland in 1966, the university became the first public college or university in Maryland to be inclusive of all races. UMBC has the fourth highest enrollment of the University System of Maryland, specializing in natural sciences and engineering, as well as programs in the liberal arts and social sciences. Its athletic teams are known as the UMBC Retrievers and participate in the America East Conference.

== History ==
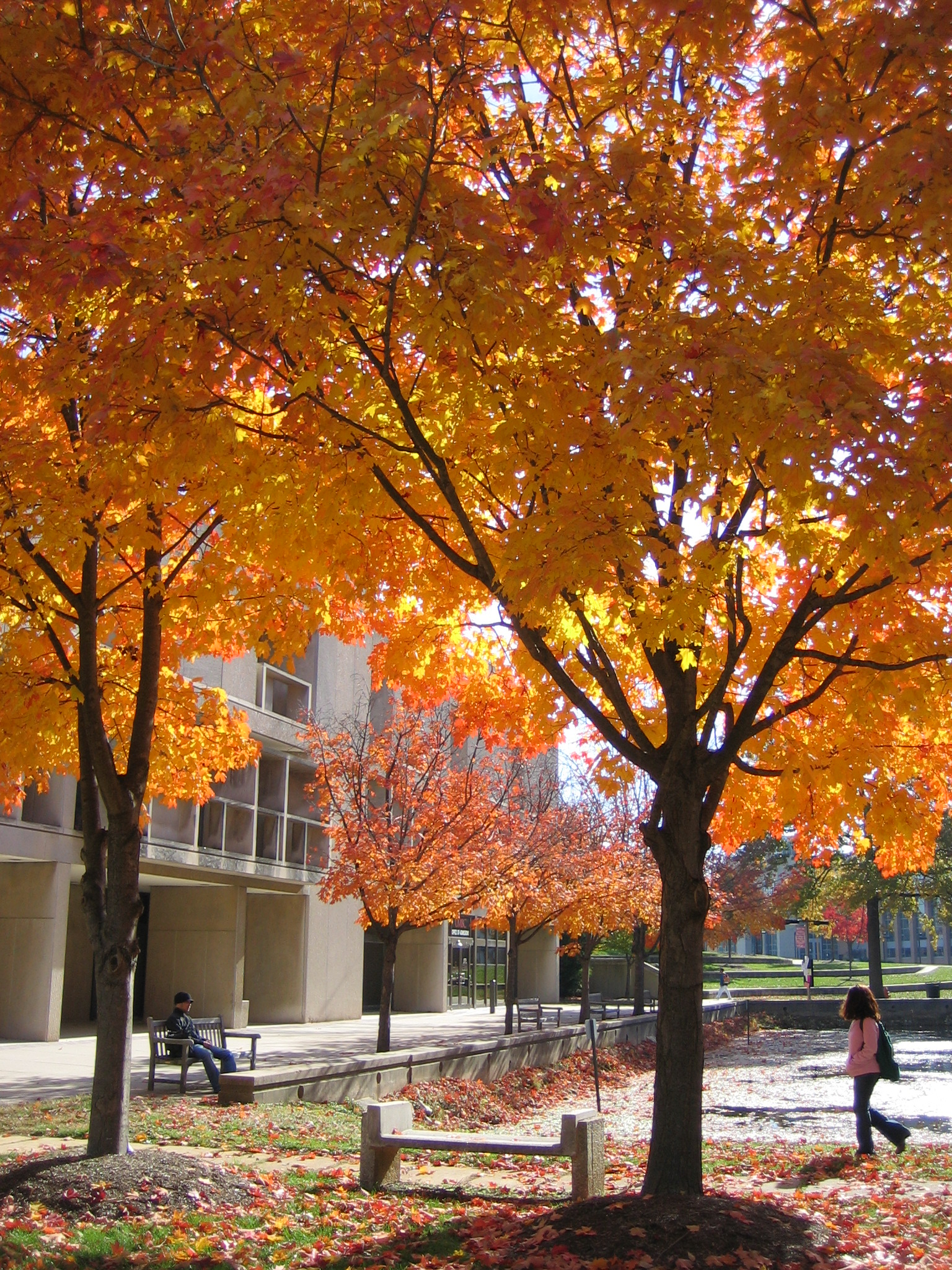
The north end of Academic Row in the center of campus.

The planning of the University of Maryland, Baltimore County was first discussed in the 1950s due to the post-World War II baby boom, the expansion of higher education under the GI Bill, and the large amount of growth both in population and industry in the Baltimore-Washington Metropolitan Area. At this time, the University of Maryland, College Park was the main higher education source in the region, so talks began about adding a branch campus in the Baltimore area. In 1955, Governor Theodore McKeldin issued "The Needs of Higher Education in Maryland," which recommended the need for university expansion. Three years later, the "Advisory Committee on Higher Education in the State of Maryland" report proposed that the Baltimore branch of the University of Maryland be established as a two-year program, subordinate to the College Park campus. In 1960, the Warfield Commission, appointed by Governor Tawes, issued, "A Plan for Expanding the University of Maryland," which propelled the idea of creating three additional university centers throughout Maryland.

In 1963, the Maryland Legislature approved the development of several new universities throughout Maryland. By the end of that year, 435 acres were purchased from Spring Grove State Hospital, a psychiatric facility in Catonsville, Maryland. The new campus would be efficiently located in Southwestern Baltimore, and would be able to be accessed from Wilkens Avenue, the Baltimore Beltway and Interstate 95. Architectural design and planning of the new campus was completed at the University of Maryland, College Park. In 1965, Albin Owings Kuhn, an accomplished administrator and professor at College Park was named Vice President of Baltimore Campuses, including both UMBC and the founding campus, University of Maryland, Baltimore. The new campus also included Dr. Homer Schamp of the College Park as the first dean of faculty, David Lewis as the first full-time faculty member and head of Social Sciences, and John Haskell Jr. as the first librarian.

The first classes began on September 19, 1966, with 750 students, 3 buildings, and the older wing of the Biological Sciences building, 45 faculty members, 35 support staff, and 500 parking spaces. As university enrollment increased drastically over the coming years, the university would also coincide with the turbulent changes in society in the 1960s. While undergoing the Civil rights movement and the Vietnam War, UMBC would prove to be a new and different atmosphere with open and peaceful minds during campus protests. In 1971, Albin Owings Kuhn resigned his position as UMBC's first chancellor, succeeded by Calvin B. T. Lee. Five years later in 1976, John Dorsey, administrative vice president at the University of Maryland, College Park was appointed as UMBC's third chancellor.

By 1980, undergraduate enrollment reached 5,800 students. Also in this year, Homecoming and Quadmania were established as cornerstone events that would become UMBC tradition for years to come. During this decade, the University Center and Sherman Hall were opened, as well as Hillside and Terrace Apartments. In addition, University of Maryland, College Park alum Jim Henson funded the establishment of the Imaging Research Center at UMBC. In 1986, Michael Hooker became chancellor, a post he held until 1992, when he was appointed president of the University of Massachusetts system. In 1988, a proposed merger of UMBC with the University of Baltimore was considered but was voted down by the University System of Maryland Board of Regents.

In 1990, undergraduate enrollment reached over 10,000 students. In 1991, a merger plan between UMBC and the University of Maryland, Baltimore was approved in the Maryland House of Delegates, but was rejected by the Senate. Throughout the last decade of the 20th century, the university opened the Engineering and Computer Science Building and Potomac Hall. UMBC's longest-serving president, Freeman A. Hrabowski III, was appointed in 1992. He retired in 2022 and was succeeded by Valerie Sheares Ashby that summer.

The first decade of the 21st century featured many university developments as UMBC approached its 40th anniversary in 2006. Some of these developments included the establishment of the Center for Urban Environmental Research and Education, a new partnership with the NASA Goddard Space Flight Center to develop the Goddard Earth Science and Technology (GEST) Center, as well as numerous expansions to the campus such as The Commons, the Physics Building, Information Technology & Engineering Building and the Public Policy Building. During this time, UMBC was recognized by the American Society for Biochemistry and Molecular Biology (ASBMB) for being the leading producers of chemistry and biochemistry degrees, and was classified by The Carnegie Foundation as being among the top tier research universities, Doctoral/Research Universities for achieving 50 or more doctoral degrees per year across at least 15 disciplines.

== Academics and research ==
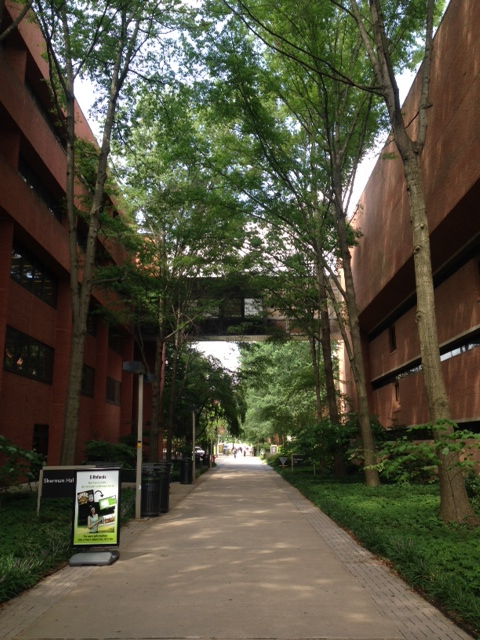
Academic Row is the main thoroughfare through the campus.

UMBC offers undergraduate and graduate degree programs in a variety of areas of study. There are 61 majors in 55 distinct programs, 70 minors, and 36 certificate programs offered in its undergraduate program. UMBC's Graduate School offers 38 master's degree programs, 25 doctoral degree programs, and 29 graduate certificate programs. The university is divided into three colleges, three schools, as well as its graduate school.

=== Colleges ===
- The UMBC College of Natural and Mathematical Sciences includes the Departments of Biological Sciences, Chemistry and Biochemistry, Marine Biotechnology, Mathematics and Statistics, Naval Science, and Physics.
- The UMBC College of Engineering and Information Technology offers different areas of study in four departments: the Departments of Chemical, Biochemical & Environmental Engineering, Computer Science and Electrical Engineering, Information Systems, and Mechanical Engineering.
- The UMBC College of Arts, Humanities and Social Sciences houses the most departments in the university and awards more than half of all undergraduate and graduate degrees. Among many others, it includes the departments of Ancient Studies, History, Dance, Music, Education, Political Science, Psychology, Media and Communication studies, and Visual Arts. Many of the departments are now housed in the new Performing Arts and Humanities Building. The Media and Communications studies department is housed on the second floor of Sherman Hall, in the A-wing. Groundbreaking and a grand opening ceremony for the Performing Arts building was held on September 19, 2012. Another grand opening ceremony was held to officially open both phases of the building on October 17, 2014.

=== Schools ===
- The UMBC Erickson School of Aging Studies offers undergraduate and graduate level programs that focuses on various aspects of aging studies, including policy and management issues.
- The Graduate School at UMBC (UMBC) represents the combined graduate and research programs at UMBC.
- The UMBC School of Public Policy includes the public policy programs for the masters and doctorate degrees.
- The University of Maryland, Baltimore School of Social Work links with UMBC in offering graduate and undergraduate level social work programs, respectively.

=== Extension ===
- UMBC Training Centers provide technical and professional training programs remotely and directly at UMBC's South Campus in Arbutus, the Columbia Gateway Campus in nearby Columbia, Maryland, and cybersecurity education in Augusta, Georgia.

=== Research and creative achievements ===
UMBC is among the fastest-growing research universities in the country and is classified as a Doctoral University with Very High Research Activity by the Carnegie Foundation. The university consistently ranks among the top 100 public U.S. institutions in federal research and development expenditures. UMBC's research themes focus on environmental sciences, especially atmospheric physics and remote sensing, Earth and space sciences, and ecology and remediation; on health and life sciences, including marine biotechnology and bio sciences and engineering; on data sciences and national security, with special focus on cybersecurity and artificial intelligence, cognitive computing, health IT, and big data analytics; on health equity and policy studies, and on public humanities and the arts.

The university is ranked among the top 15 U.S. universities in NASA funding. UMBC's NASA-funded centers at NASA Goddard include the Joint Center for Earth Systems Technology (JCET), the Goddard Planetary Heliophysics Institute (GPHI), and the Center for Space Sciences and Technology (CSST). In April 2021, CSST received an additional $54 million in funding from NASA Goddard for astrophysics research.

Faculty at UMBC have been recognized with 40 National Science Foundation CAREER Awards since 1995, including nine since 2017. Two UMBC researchers have received the Presidential Early Career Award in Science and Engineering (PECASE) — one from NSF in 2005 and one from NSA in 2014. UMBC also has one of only two Howard Hughes Medical Institute investigators at a public university in Maryland, a National Academy of Sciences member, as well as a DARPA Young Faculty Award winner, and NASA's 2012 Distinguished Public Service Medal recipient. UMBC faculty regularly receive Fulbright and Guggenheim fellowships.

bwtech@UMBC, UMBC's incubator and research park, houses more than 130 companies and three incubators in cybersecurity, life sciences, and clean technology. UMBC has more than 20 campus-wide centers and institutes, including three Collaborative Centers with NASA Goddard (JCET, GPHI, and CSST), the Center for Accelerated Real-Time Analytics (CARTA), the Center for Advanced Sensor Technology (CAST), the Center for Urban Environmental Research and Education (CUERE), the Earth and Space Institute (ESI), The Hilltop Institute, the Center for Social Science Scholarship (CS3), the Center for Art, Design & Visual Culture (CADVC), the Dresher Center, the Imaging Research Center (IRC), and the UMBC AI Center.

== Campus ==
=== History ===
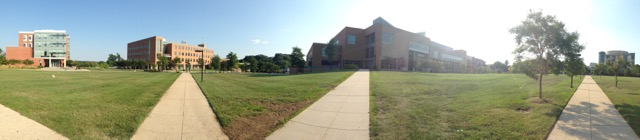
Panorama of the central quad looking south.
From left to right: Public Policy and Physics Buildings, The Commons and the Kuhn Library & Gallery

In 1840, the state of Maryland purchased the land where the university is located today. At that time, it was known as the Stabler Estate, owned by the prominent Stabler family of Baltimore County. James P. Stabler, the chief engineer and superintendent of the Baltimore and Ohio Railroad was connected to the estate. The Baltimore Trade School, an orphan's home located on present day Giffen Hill, was established in that same year. The school continued to operate and farm the surrounding acreage up until World War II. The state later added the property to Spring Grove State Hospital, which farmed the land until the university's establishment. A few of the original structures were still in use by UMBC for some time, including the Hillcrest Building and a farmhouse. Located off of Walker Avenue, the Hillcrest Building was originally built in 1921 to house patients of Spring Grove State Hospital. The building was historically significant for it was the "first building constructed specifically for the care and treatment of mentally ill prisoners to be built at a state psychiatric hospital anywhere in the United States". In 1965, the structure was used as UMBC's administration building, and later used as the office of residential life and a student union. A common campus urban legend claims that the man that Hannibal Lecter was based on lived in a basement cell of the building. Hillcrest was demolished in 2007 due to toxicity concerns, leaving the farm silo on UMBC Boulevard to be oldest surviving structure on the university's campus.

Opened for enrollment in 1966, UMBC was created to serve the overflow of students from the Baltimore area seeking admission to University of Maryland, College Park. From its beginning, the new commuter campus faced a surfeit of problems. Sited on free land taken from a state hospital, the campus was not sponsored or protected by any political constituency. There were already nine other campuses in the metropolitan area. Located a few miles from the University of Maryland, Baltimore campus, there was no chance UMBC could develop the array of professional schools common to research universities. Its County name, an afterthought, was more consistent with two-year schools than a Ph.D. - granting institution. Yet as UMBC continues past its 50th anniversary, it has become a national role model for new American universities. The book Improbable Excellence: the Saga Of UMBC chronicles this development.

=== Landscape ===
The Commons serve as the university's student union, meeting center, and activity center.

UMBC's main entrance is approached from Metropolitan Boulevard where there is a UMBC Campus exit that leads to UMBC Boulevard. Soon after the campus exit, UMBC Boulevard intersects Research Park Drive which leads into UMBC's Research & Technology Park. UMBC's campus is also served by Wilkens Avenue, which provides access to the Baltimore Beltway and Rolling Road. Entrances off of Wilkens Avenue include Hilltop Road and Walker Avenue. Hilltop Road leads towards Catonsville's Business District on Frederick Road and Spring Grove Hospital Center. On the other side of the campus, Poplar Avenue gives direct access to Arbutus's Business District on East Drive. The campus core is served by Hilltop Circle, which creates a complete circle encompassing the campus.

Academic Row is known to be the central pedestrian concourse and maintenance vehicle highway in the campus that borders along a series of buildings. Beginning south at Administration Drive, the pathway is covered by mature trees on either side. Academic Row is bordered by the Administration Building, the Retriever Activities Center, Janet and Walter Sondheim Hall, Sherman Hall (Previously named Academic IV), University Center, Math and Psychology Building, Biological Sciences Building, and the Meyerhoff Chemistry Building. At the northern end, the walkway is intersected by Schwartz Breezeway leading to the Commons, the university's student union. Academic Row terminates at the Albin O. Kuhn Library & Gallery, where multiple paths radiate across Erickson Field towards the Commons, the Physics and Public Policy Buildings, West Hills, Hillside, and Terrace Apartments, as well as additional dormitories.

Taking any of the tree-lined staircases to the next level of campus leads to the ITE, Engineering, and Fine Arts buildings, all of which can also be accessed though shortcuts from any of the multitude of buildings on Academic Row. As of 2015, the new Performing Arts and Humanities building has also been servicing students, which is another short walk up from the Engineering building. New lots have also been constructed outside of the Performing Arts and Humanities building in order to accommodate more commuter students and faculty. Fall of 2015 brings with it two new roundabouts that have been made at the intersection of Administration Drive and Research Park Drive and between Research Park Drive and the entrance ramp on to I-95.

On the southern side of the Commons, a large grassy area known as the Quad is where many student events and activities take place throughout the school year. Another area of student congregation is at UC Plaza in front of the University Center. The University Center houses multiple dining options, the UC Ballroom, as well as additional university event and teaching space.

=== Gallery ===
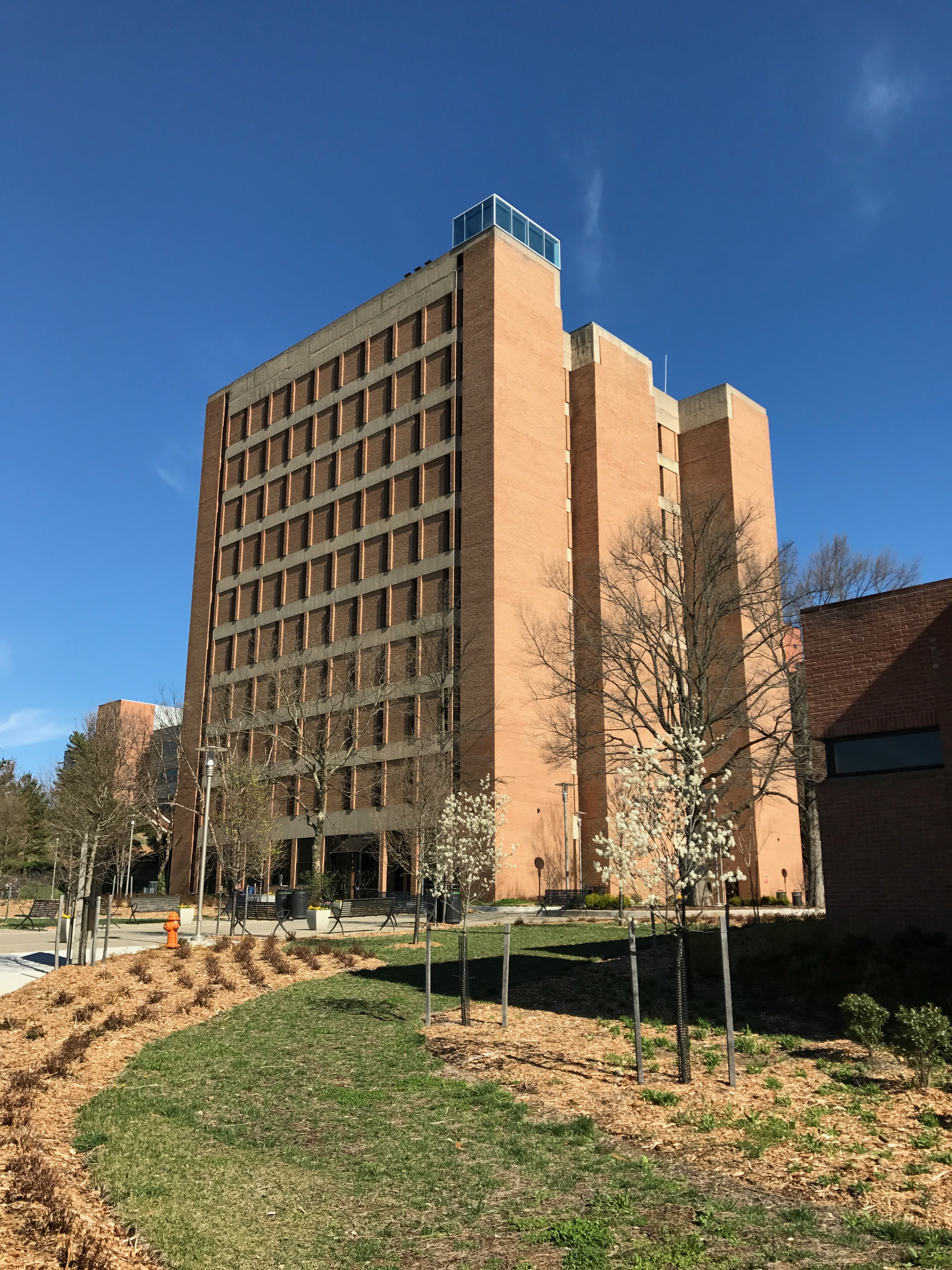
Administration Building

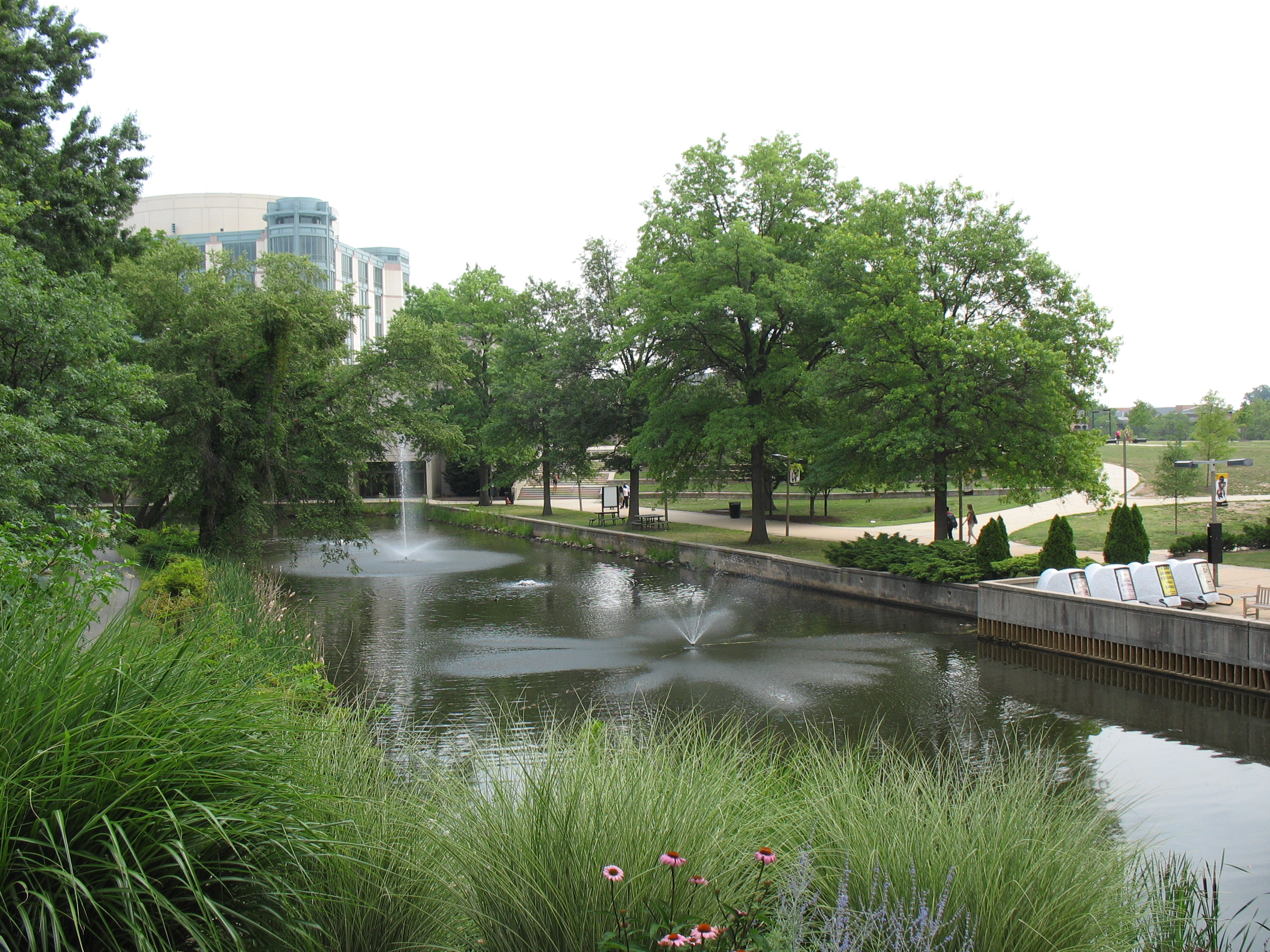
Library Pond

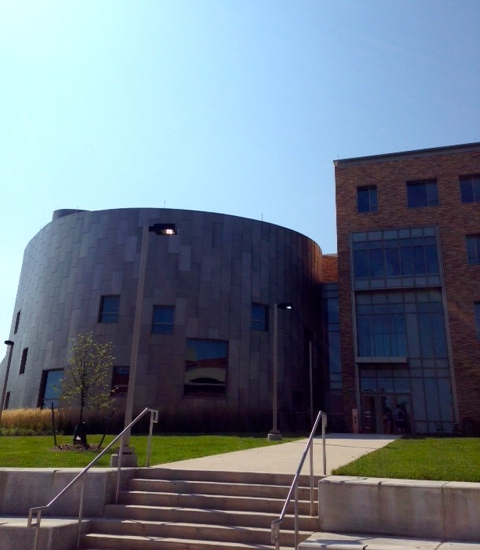
Performing Arts and Humanities Building

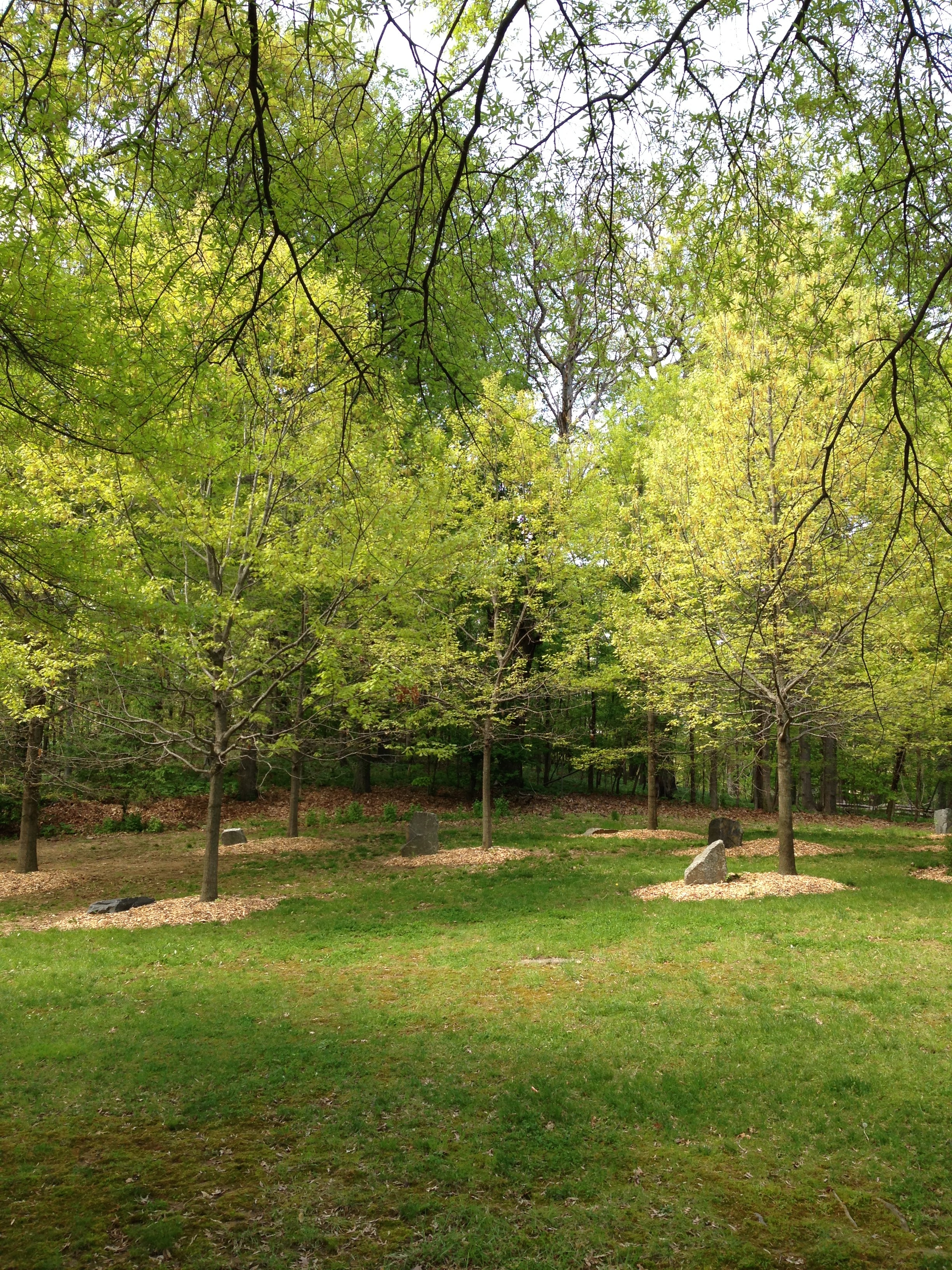
Joseph Beuys Sculpture Park

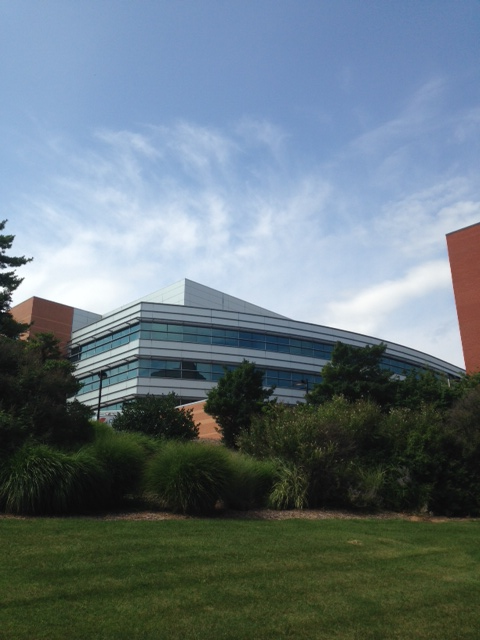
Information Technology and Engineering Building

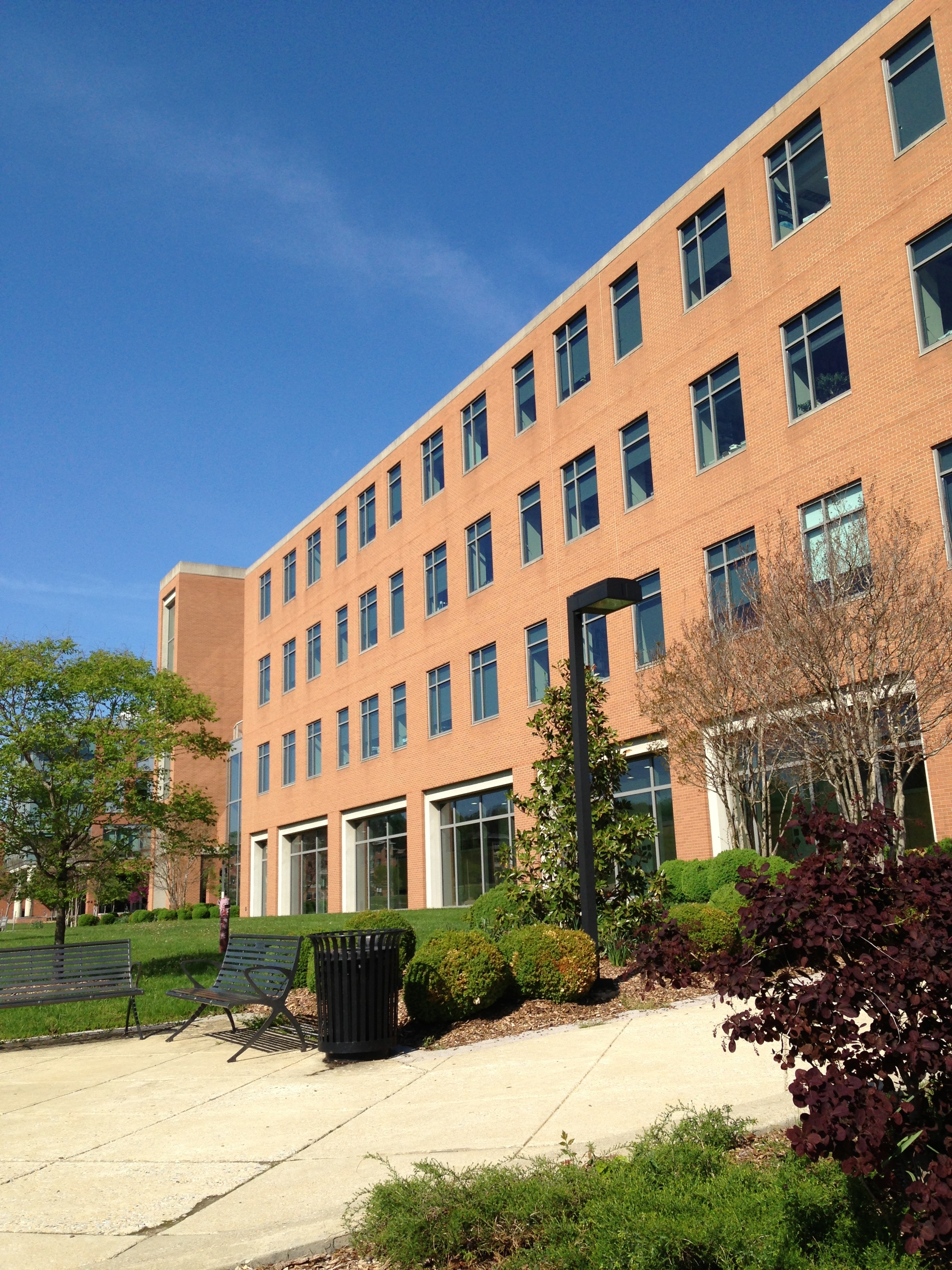
Physics Building

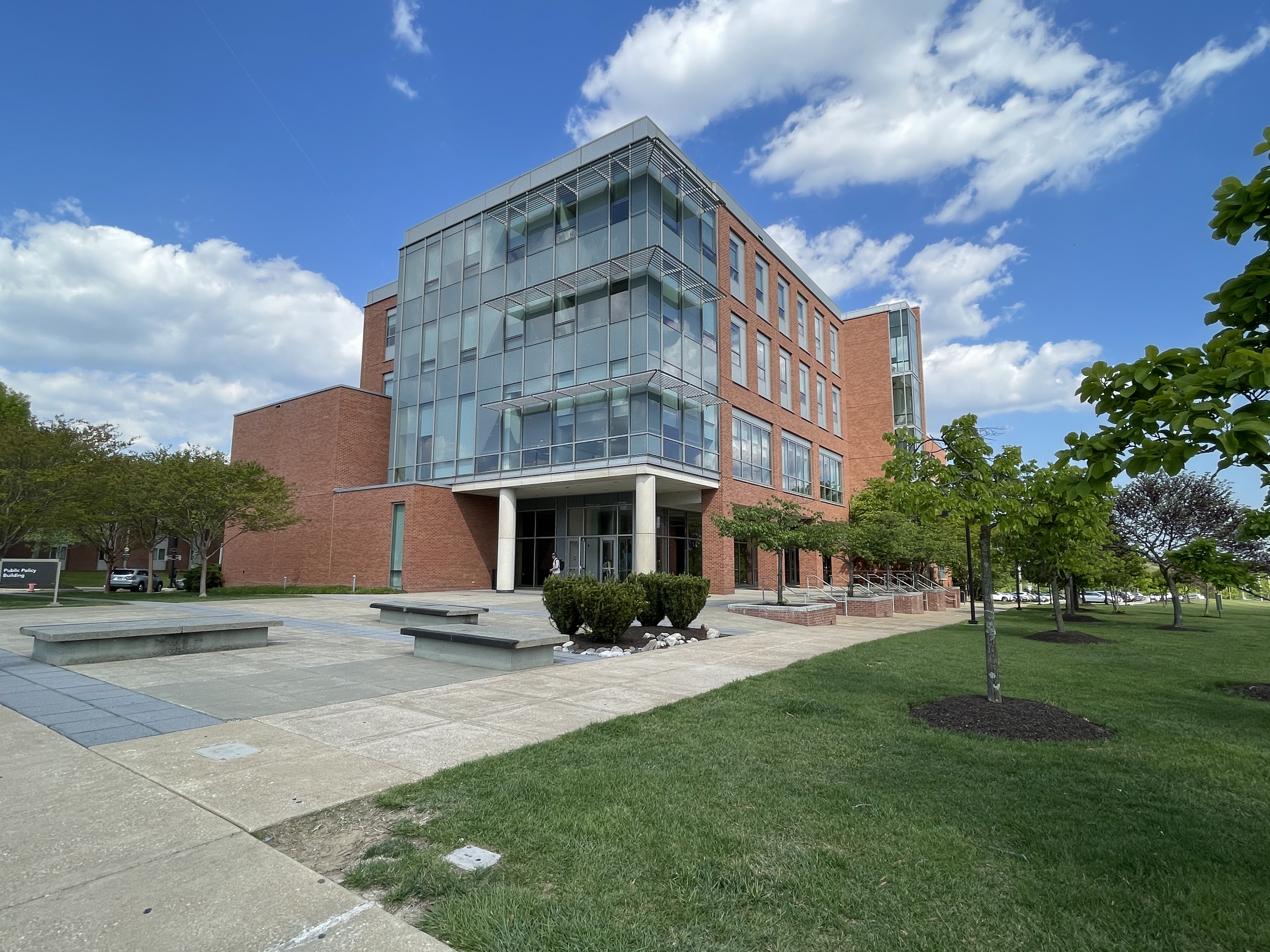
The Public Policy Building.

=== Location ===
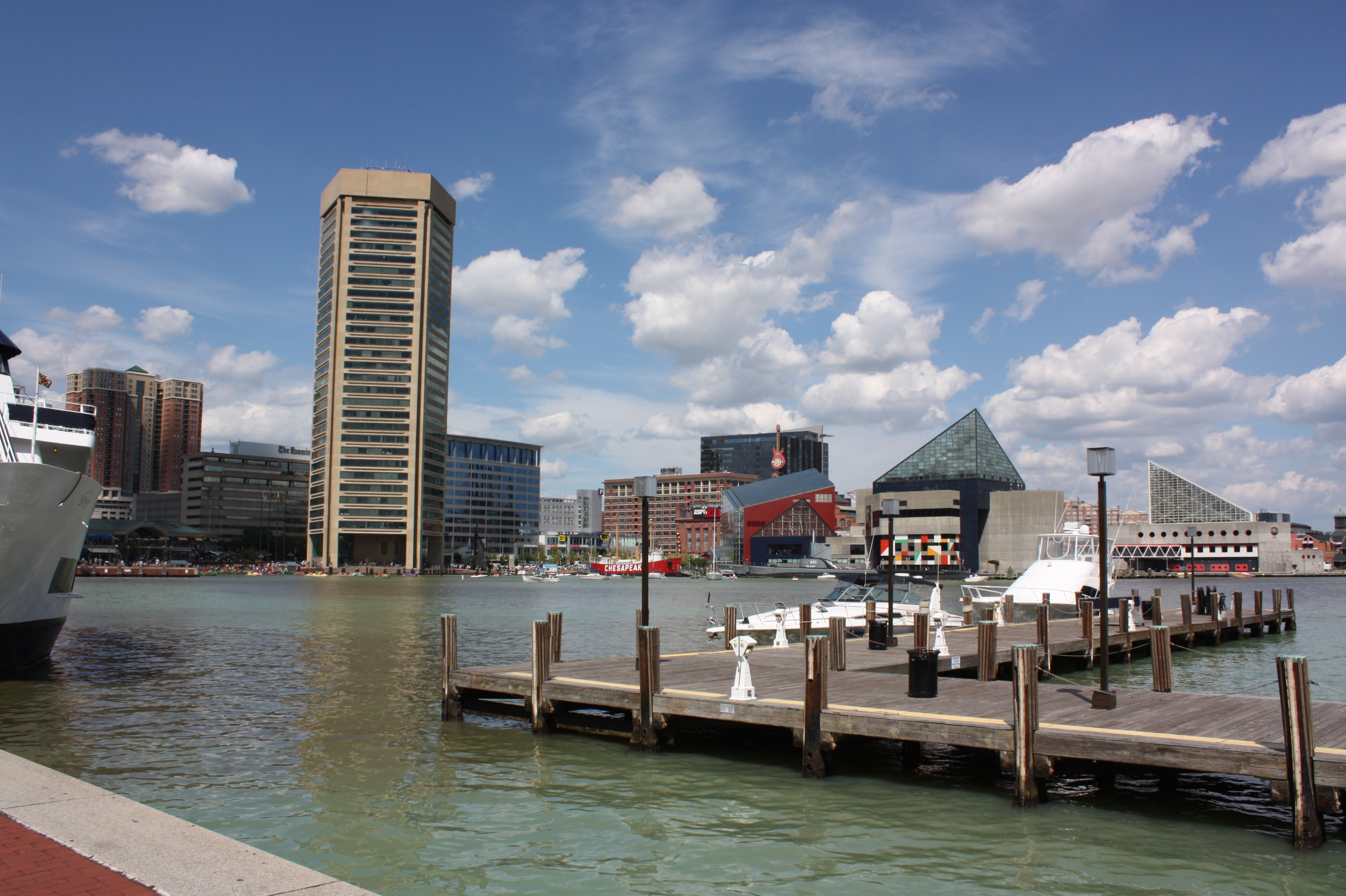
Baltimore's Inner Harbor

UMBC's campus is located on 500 acres. It is approximately 15 minutes from Baltimore's Inner Harbor and 60 minutes from Washington, D.C. Baltimore-Washington International Airport is approximately 10 minutes away, as well as Amtrak and Baltimore Light Rail stations (BWI Airport and BWI Business District). In addition, the MARC Penn Line serves the UMBC population at Halethorpe Station, which is located approximately two miles away on Southwestern Boulevard in Arbutus, Maryland. The Halethorpe/Satellite bus transit line transports students to and from the train station. UMBC, three miles outside Baltimore city limits, successfully lobbied the government to use 'Baltimore' as its address. While its suburban campus has minimal interaction with its surroundings, students variously consider it to be located in the towns of Catonsville (by CDP) or Arbutus (whose street grid it borders). The campus is undercut by a series of tunnels.

Originally UMBC was supposed to be located in Baltimore. However, due to many disputes the university is located in the neighborhood of Southern Catonsville, 1.5 miles south of Catonsville's Central Business District along Frederick Road. Catonsville provides a college town atmosphere for UMBC by having numerous restaurants, bars, and other conveniences. The town also provides festivals and farmers' markets every Sunday from May to November.

UMBC also offers seven undergraduate and four graduate programs at The Universities at Shady Grove, a campus in Rockville, Maryland that is shared by nine Maryland public universities.

=== Research and Technology Park ===
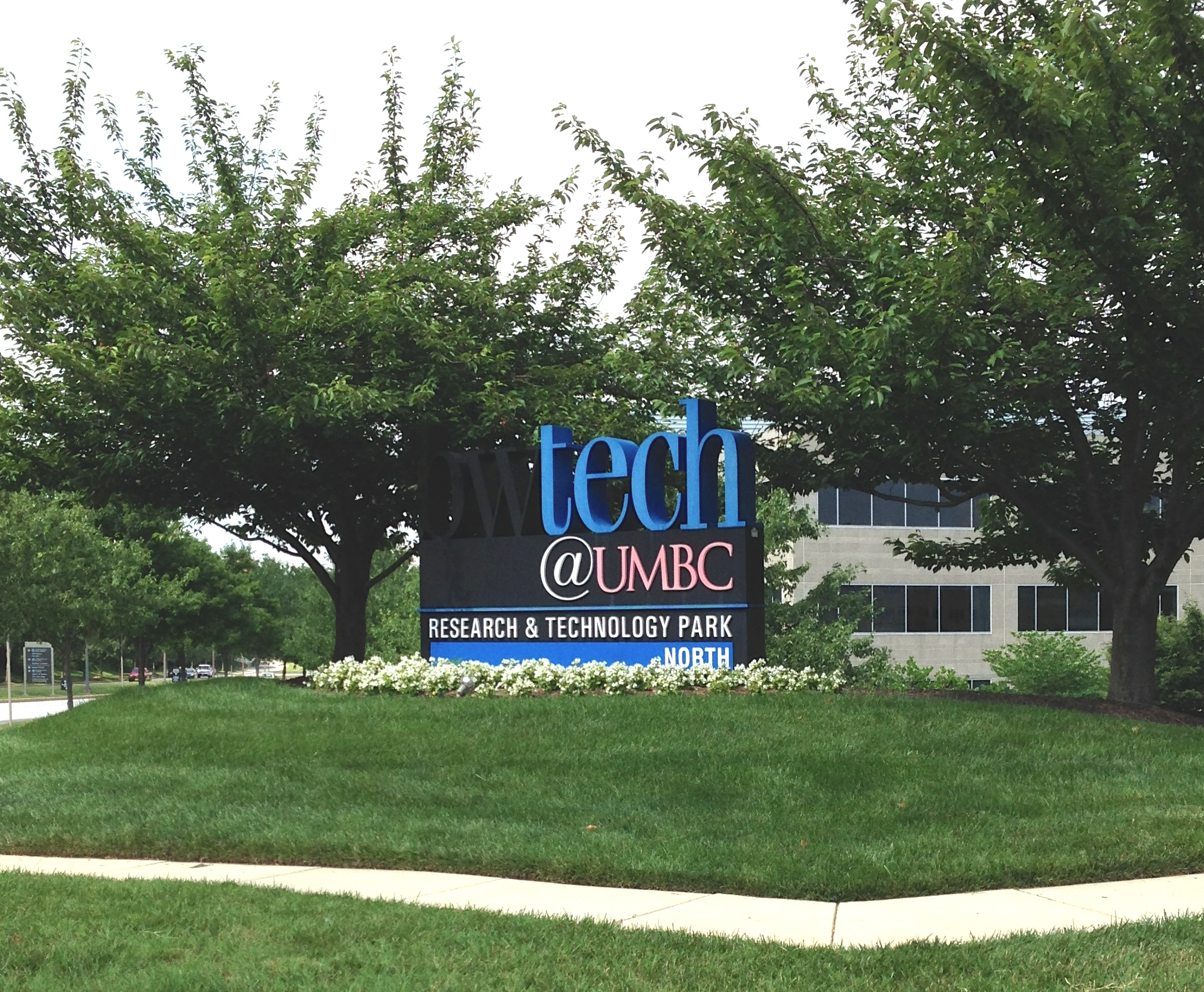
BWTech@UMBC entrance from the north of campus

UMBC Research and Technology Park is a 71-acre development on the campus hosting technology, bioscience and research organizations, many of which are engaged in partnership with the university. The research park, split into two campuses, is the oldest university research park in Maryland. The North Campus focuses primarily on cybersecurity, and includes the Cyber Incubator and a new addition of the CyberHive. The South Campus is a life-science and business incubator, and has graduated over 50 companies through its program. Research Park tenants include the US Geological Survey, US Forestry Service, CardioMed Device Consultants, Audacious Inquiry, Med-IQ, Physician Practice, Inc., Retirement Living TV, Ascentium Corporation, Solvern Innovations, RMF Engineering, Inc., Convergent Technology, Clear Resolution Consulting, Fearless Solutions, Potomac Photonics, and Next Breath.

=== Transportation ===
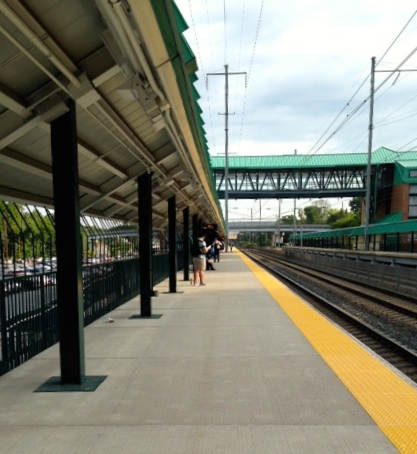
Halethorpe Station connects UMBC to nearby Baltimore and Washington, D.C.

UMBC has several bus shuttle lines that are available to UMBC's students, faculty, and staff. All but the Wave 'n Ride are free by showing of one's campus identification card. The Wave ‘n Ride was historically available to anyone who needs intra-campus transport around Hilltop Circle and UMBC Boulevard, but the service is pending decommission.

In August 2014, service has expanded to two new lines connect the campus to downtown Baltimore. These two lines (Downtown A-B Lines) also connect the campus to the Baltimore Metro Subway by way of Lexington Market Station. The Downtown B Line connects to the Metro as well as MARC Train at Camden Station, and the Baltimore Light Rail by way of Convention Center Station.

The Maryland Transit Administration offers additional service to the UMBC community. Bus lines 35, 77, and 95 offer service to the campus. The MARC Train provides Penn Line rail service two miles from the campus at Halethorpe station, connecting the university to Baltimore and Washington.

The UMBC campus is home to a number of trails for pedestrians and bicyclists as well. Some of these pathways include a walking bridge and path that connects the central campus to the Research Park to the south, as well as an unpaved path from UMBC Boulevard to Selford Road that is frequented by runners and joggers. Nearby, the Short Line Railroad Trail can be accessed through Hilltop Road and Spring Grove Hospital Center. The rail trail provides paved pathway access from downtown Catonsville and Paradise, crossing the Baltimore Beltway. Additionally, cyclists have on-road bike routes from the campus to Halethorpe station via downtown Arbutus.

=== Campus police ===
UMBC maintains a 24-hour police staff of sworn officers, supplemented by non-sworn security officers and student marshals. Like the campus police of the University of Maryland, College Park and the University of Maryland, Baltimore, the campus police are accredited by the Commission on Accreditation for Law Enforcement Agencies. Accreditation is expected by the University System of Maryland mandated 2013 deadline. The UMBC police logs all crime reports and statistics as required by law on the UMBC Police Webpage.

== President ==
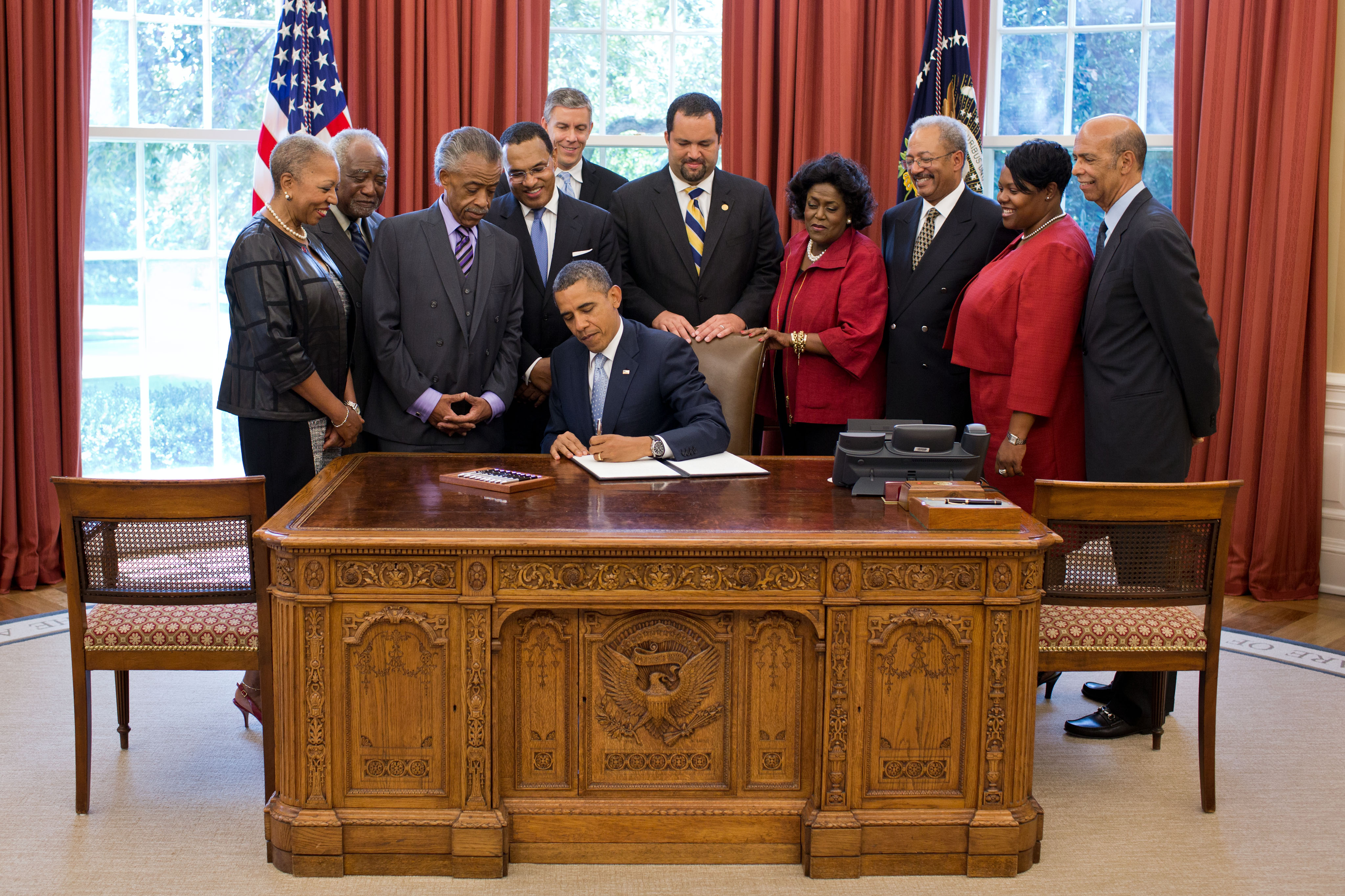
Freeman A. Hrabowski III, pictured behind President Barack Obama, at the White House for the Initiative on Educational Excellence for African Americans Executive Order in 2012.

In May 1992, Freeman A. Hrabowski III began his term as president of the University of Maryland, Baltimore County. He was named by TIME Magazine as one of the "100 Most Influential People in the World", and for his work with UMBC was honored as America's Top 10 College Presidents in 2009. Under his leadership, UMBC was the #1 Up and Coming University in the US for six consecutive years (2009, 2010, 2011, 2012, 2013, and 2014) by U.S. News & World Report magazine.

On August 1, 2022, following Hrabowski's retirement, Valerie Sheares Ashby became president of the university, becoming its first female president.

== Rankings ==
Academic rankings

National
- Forbes: 164
- U.S. News & World Report: 137
- Washington Monthly: 206
- WSJ/College Pulse: 270

Global
- QS: 711-720
- THE: 601-800
- U.S. News & World Report: 601-800

USNWR graduate school rankings
| Biological Sciences | 140 |
| Chemistry | 81 |
| Clinical Psychology | 74 |
| Computer Science | 82 |
| Engineering | 90 |
| Fine Arts | 89 |
| Mathematics | 117 |
| Physics | 91 |
| Psychology | 98 |
| Public Affairs | 82 |
| Statistics | 69 |

The university is ranked tied for 127th in the 2025 U.S. News & World Report rankings of "National Universities" in the United States, and is ranked tied for 74th nationally among public universities. It was ranked tied for 15th nationally in undergraduate teaching and 14th in innovation. UMBC ranks fourth among U.S. research universities in the production of IT degrees and certificates, according to U.S. Department of Education data. The data shows UMBC ranking #21 in MS, and #31 in PhD IT degree production.

In 2012, U.S. News & World Report rated UMBC as the 12th most under-performing university, citing a gap between academic reputation and performance in the academic indicators. The university is classified as a research university with very high research activity.

== Partnerships ==
The university has formed a variety of centers and institutes. It has a partnership with NASA. The Center for Space Science and Technology, Goddard Earth Sciences and Technology Center, and the Joint Center for Earth Systems Technology all are affiliated with the Goddard Space Flight Center in Greenbelt, Maryland, and share collaboration efforts with the University of Maryland, College Park.

In 2014, the university signed agreements with the United States Army Research Laboratory and the United States Army Research, Development and Engineering Command, for research in information systems, computer science, cybersecurity, networks, sensors, communications, mathematics and statistics, human dimensions, human systems integration, synthetic biology, power, quantum information processing, natural language processing and robotics.

USB and the University of Maryland, Baltimore (UMB) jointly operate the Research & Innovation Partnership Seed Grant program, which aims to promote inter-institutional research collaborations between the two USM institutions and to stimulate joint grant proposals to federal agencies and foundations. This shared program allows students and faculty to receive grants for research, increased collaboration, as well as the ability to use the facilities of both universities.

In February 2015, UMBC formed another partnership with Kyushu University in Fukuoka, Japan, for research in computer security.

Furthermore, in the spring of 2015 an array of partnerships between UMBC and the US Navy were announced. The two announced the opening of the first Naval ROTC unit in Maryland, on the campus of UMBC, with the US Navy sponsoring a multitude of four year full-ride scholarships for select candidates. In addition, a cybersecurity research partnership between the two institutions was announced, beginning with five collaborative research projects between UMBC faculty and students and the US Navy.

== Sustainability ==
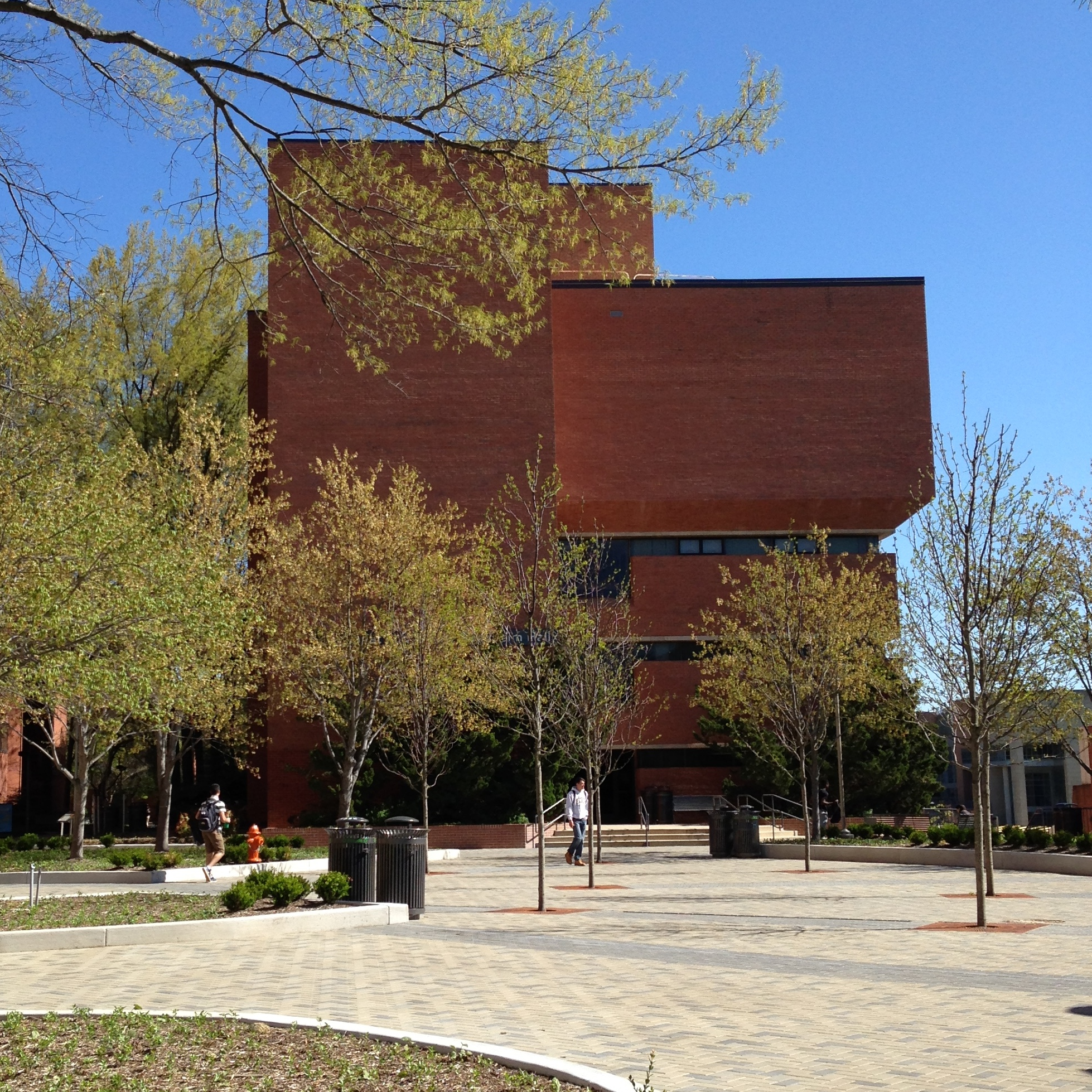
Sondheim Hall, home to the UMBC Department of Geography & Environmental Systems.

In 1997, President Freeman Hrabowski created the Conservation and Environmental Research Areas of UMBC also known as CERA on the south end of the campus. The conservation area encompasses 50 acres surrounding Pig Pen Pond and Bwtech@UMBC Research and Technology Park. At the same time as preserving the land, CERA allowed UMBC students to use the land for educational and recreational purposes. CERA contains two parts. The larger tract, covering approximately 45 acres of the south end of the main campus, contains a wide variety of ecological conditions: mature upland forest, early- and mid- successional forest, and riparian and wetland environments. The second, area is much smaller, with an area of about 3 acres. This surrounds Pigpen Pond, which was once actually a pigpen until it filled with water. There are also several areas within CERA where evidence of previous human occupancy and use can be found. In addition to teaching opportunities for faculty, CERA offers a wide range of opportunities for students and faculty to undertake short and long-term research projects in a variety of disciplines. Management of CERA is guided by the need to maintain these landscapes as natural areas to be preserved and protected for approved uses in education, research and wildlife observation.

In 2007, President Freeman Hrabowski signed on to the American College and University President's Climate Commitment (ACUPCC) and formed the Climate Change Task Force. Additional sustainable efforts include a green roof on Patapsco Hall, and the construction of new LEED certified buildings such as West Hills Community Center and the Performing Arts and Humanities Building. Preservation has also been a growing focus for UMBC, through the creation of CERA, Conservation Environmental Research Area. "No-mow zones" and stormwater retention ponds have also been added to the campus.

In 2013, UMBC earned Tree Campus USA recognition by the Arbor Day Foundation.

In May 2014, UMBC dedicated 11 acres on the northeastern side of the campus for preservation through the Maryland Department of Natural Resources. Also in 2014, the university has opened its first community garden for its students. The garden will give students the chance to grow their own food on campus.

In May 2015, two Prove It! teams went on to win the $10,000 grant for their sustainability driven ideas to improve the life of students. The first, Retriever Treasure, collects unwanted furniture, clothes, and other items from students moving out of dorms and apartments at the end of each school year. They then resell these items at the beginning of the school year to raise funds for other initiatives and donate the remainder of the items not sold. The second, SolarRetrievers, raised an additional $30,000 from UMBC Residential Life, Facilities Management, and The Commons to purchase 4 EnerFusion Solar Power-Dok solar tables. These tables promote the idea of sustainable energy by directly demonstrating how solar panels are used to charge a battery and power devices in areas that normally would not have electricity readily available. The tables are located in the courtyard between Harbor and Chesapeake Hall, The Commons terrace, and two are on the terrace outside of the Retriever Activities Center.

== Mascot ==
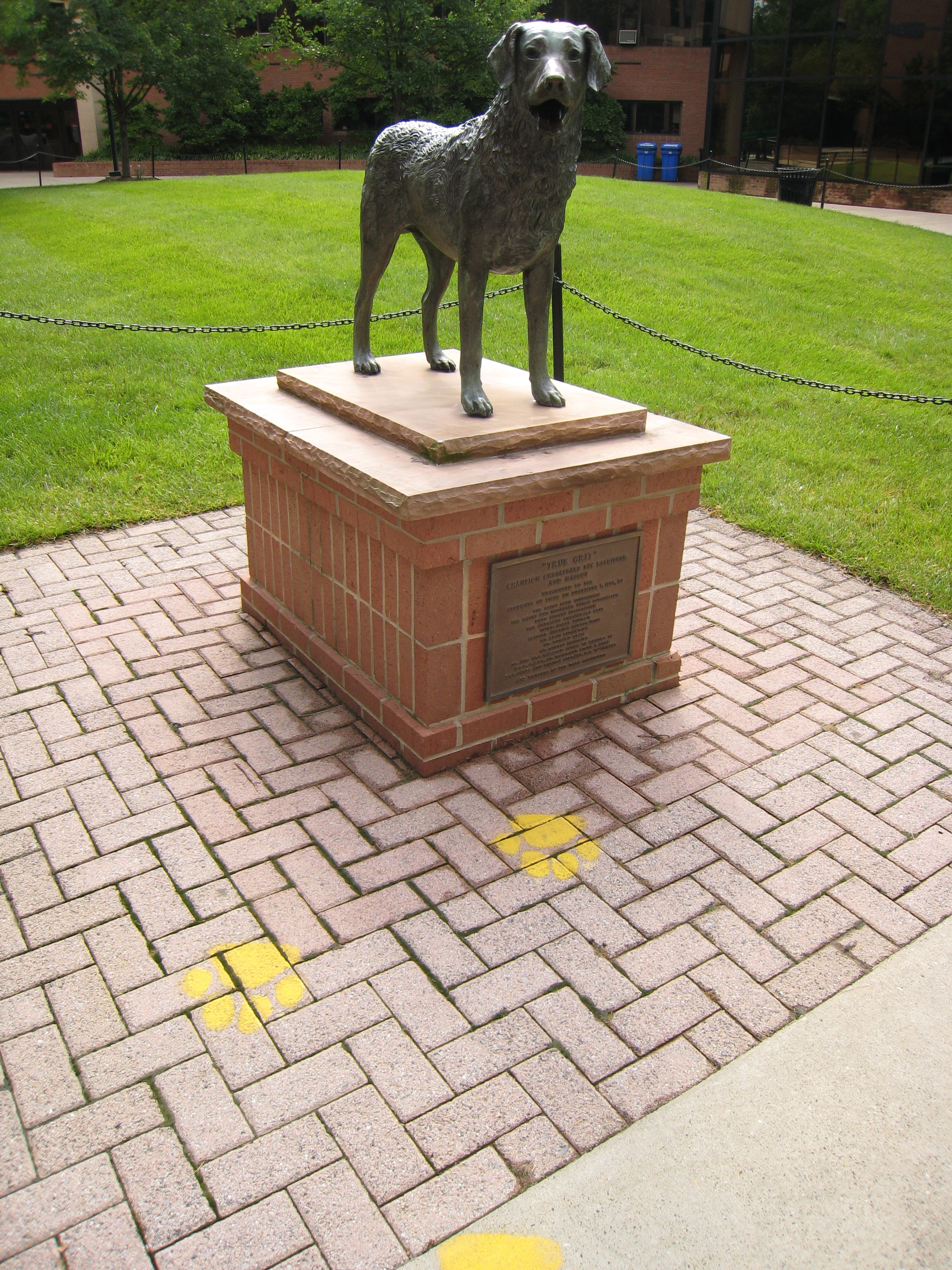
True Grit statue on campus.

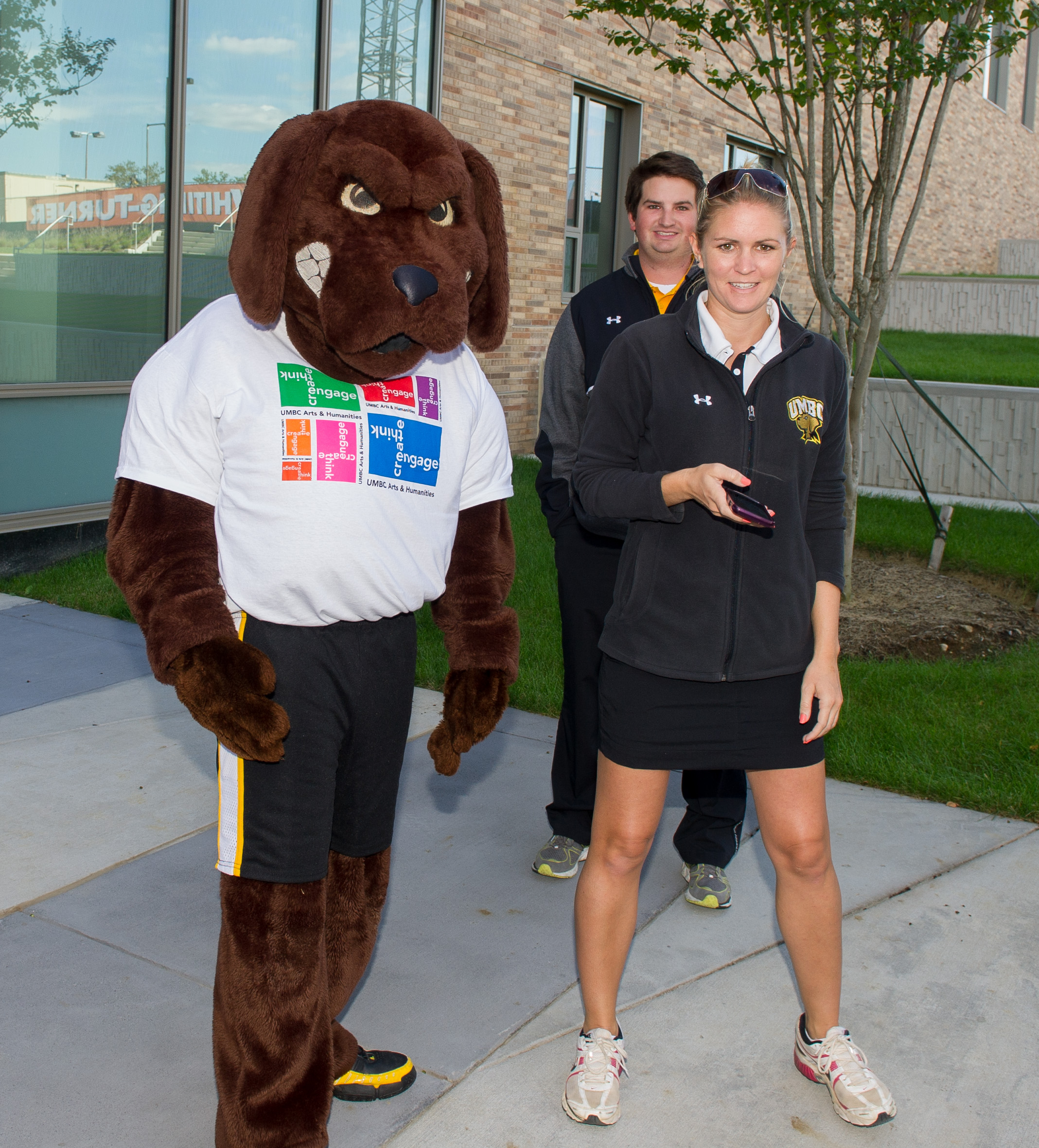
True Grit at the opening of the Performing Arts & Humanities Building

The Chesapeake Bay Retriever is the state dog of Maryland and has been the mascot of UMBC since weeks after its founding in 1966. The costumed mascot was alternately known as "Fever the Retriever" in the late 1990s. The university also once had a live mascot, upon whom the True Grit statue is based, named Campus Sam. At the beginning of the 2008 fall semester, a Chesapeake Bay retriever puppy was chosen as a new mascot. He attends many athletic events and an online poll was held on the Retriever Activities Center website to choose his name, which was ultimately decided as "Gritty". The school's dining hall is named True Grits.

== Student life ==
Undergraduate demographics as of Fall 2023
| Race and ethnicity | Total |
|---|---|
| White | 31% |
| Asian | 24% |
| Black | 24% |
| Hispanic | 9% |
| Two or more races | 6% |
| International student | 5% |
| Unknown | 1% |
Economic diversity
| Low-income (Note: The percentage of students who received an income-based federal Pell grant intended for low-income students.) | 30% |
| Affluent (Note: The percentage of students who are a part of the American middle class at the bare minimum.) | 70% |

The Resident Student Association and Student Events Board provide social programming during all academic semesters at UMBC. Over 220 student-run organizations exist on campus.

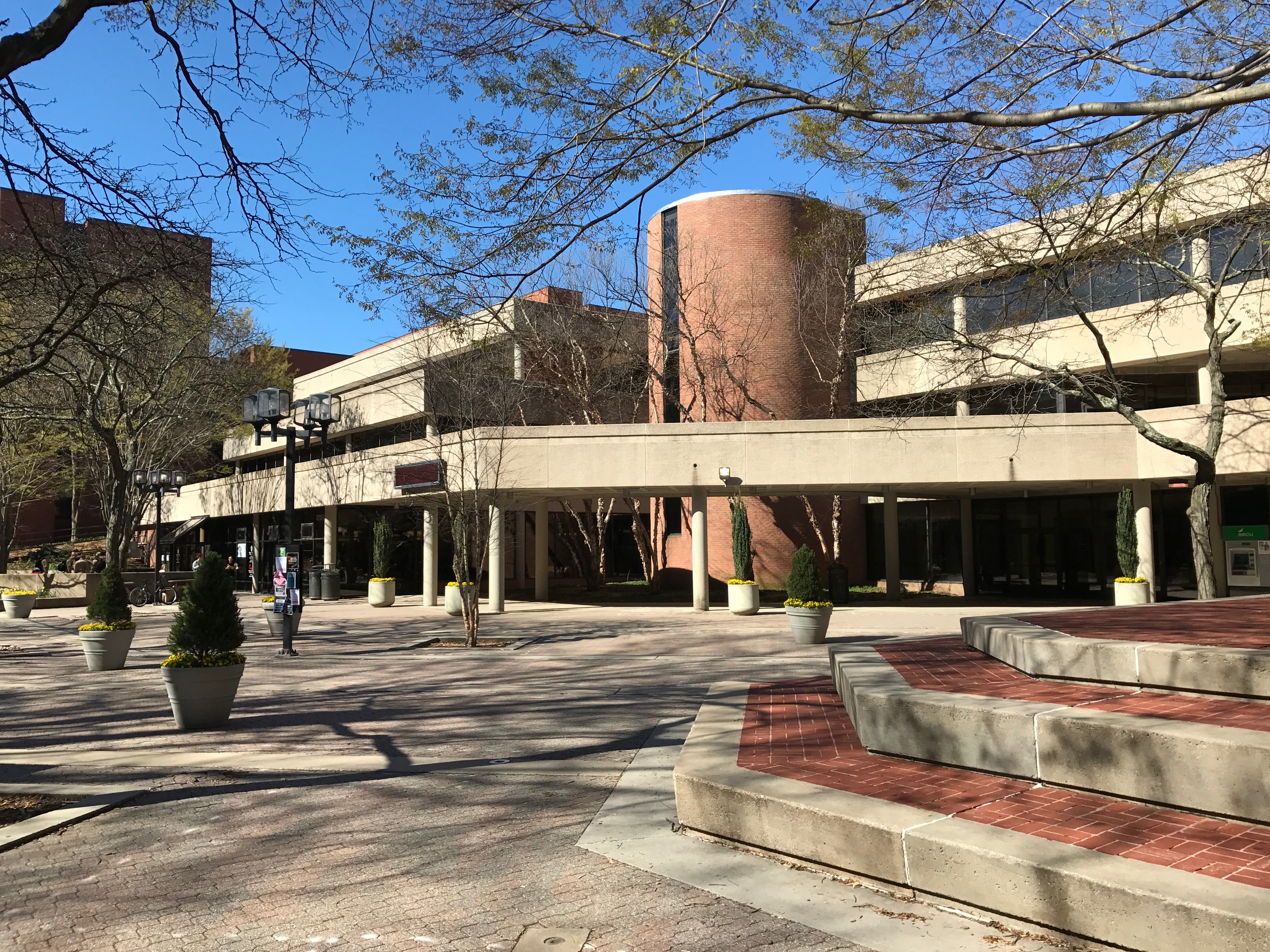
University Center

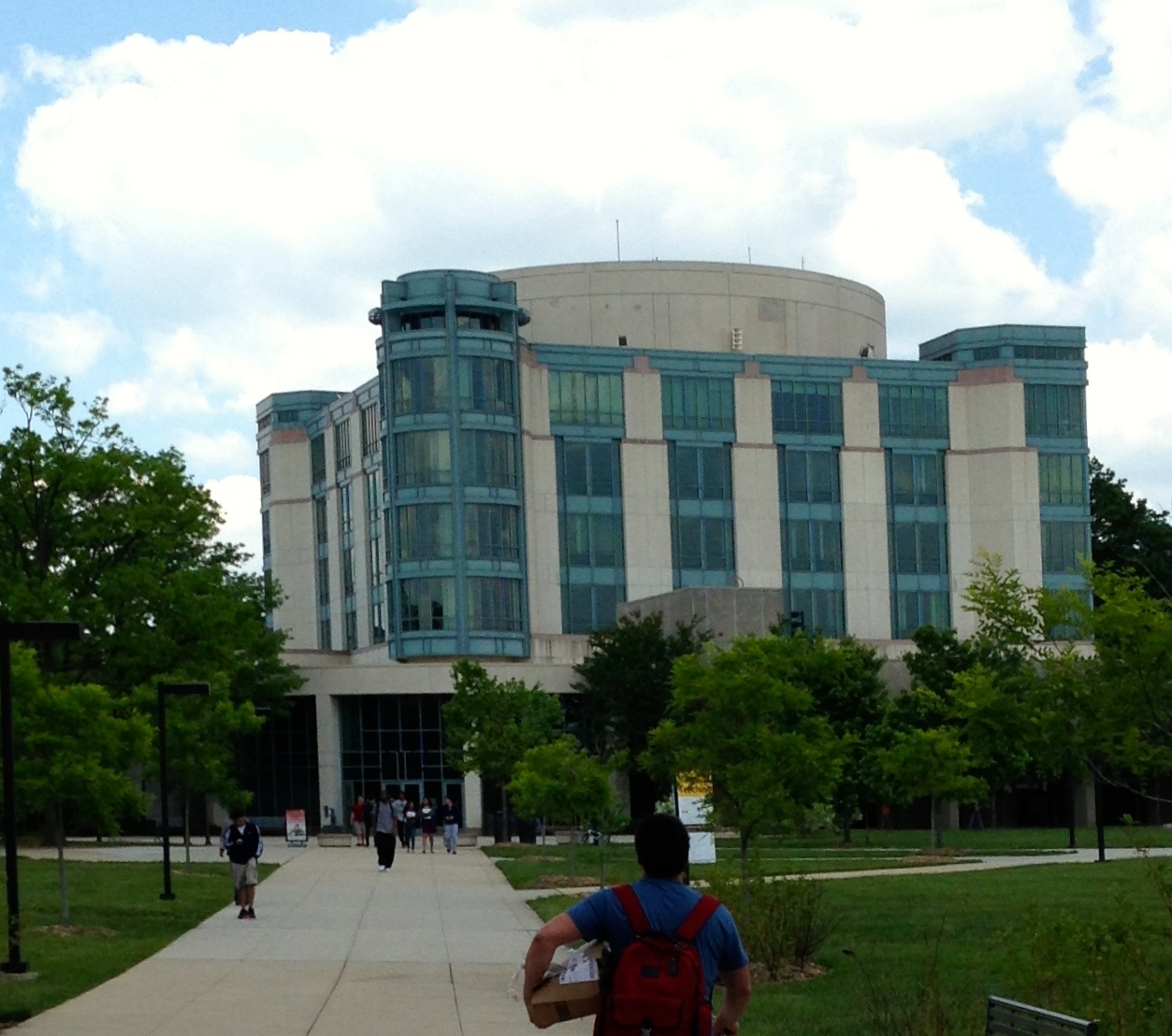
The Albin O. Kuhn Library viewed from The Commons

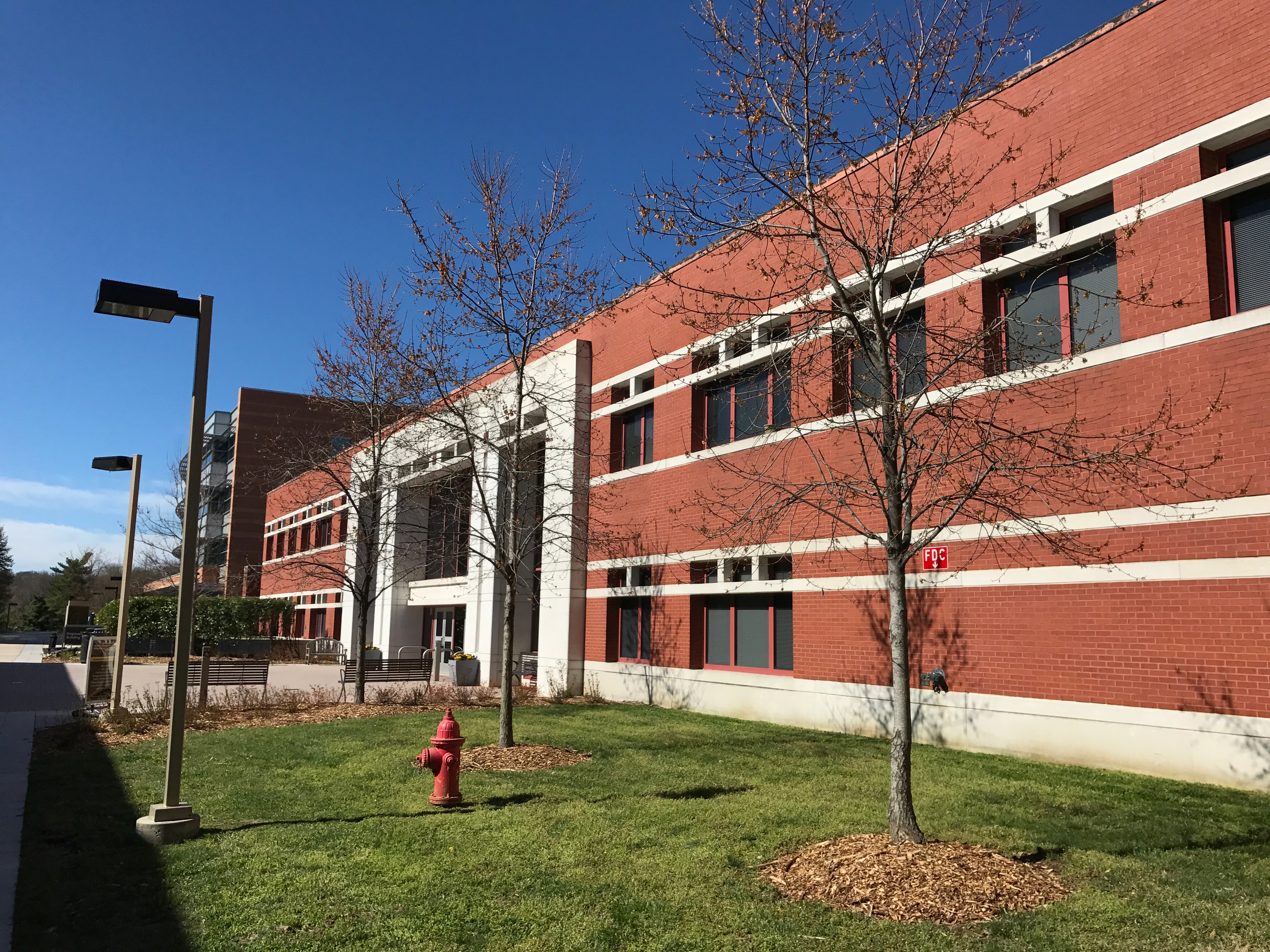
Engineering Building

=== LLC (Language Literacy & Culture) ===
This interdisciplinary doctoral program draws upon faculty from disciplines in the humanities and social sciences from eight departments and programs at UMBC: African Studies; American Studies; Education; English; History; Gender and Women's Studies; Modern Languages, Linguistics and Intercultural Communication; and Sociology and Anthropology.

=== Student Events Board ===
UMBC holds homecoming in the fall semester during the month of October. Homecoming consists of numerous activities and festivities on campus. Namely, Homecoming includes the 5K Dawg Chase race, and a comedy show. Past performances include Trevor Noah, Jim Gaffigan, B. J. Novak, Nick Offerman, Bo Burnham, and others.

Quadmania serves as the university's student festival during the spring semester. The event takes place during April outdoors, near the center of campus on the Quad or Erickson Field. The headliner for the spring of 2012 was Gym Class Heroes. The headliner for the spring of 2013 was Macklemore & Ryan Lewis and that for the spring of 2014 was Capital Cities. The 2014 Quadmania was also to have elephant rides, but these were allegedly cancelled due to claims of animal cruelty by some students. In 2015, Kesha performed at the Retriever Activities Center. In spring of 2016, Fetty Wap headlined Quad Mania on April 24. In the spring of 2017, T-Pain returned to UMBC and headlined the event.

=== Greek life ===
UMBC has 20 registered sororities and fraternities with nearly 5% of UMBC's undergraduate students belonging to one of them.

=== Mock Trial ===
UMBC fields an undergraduate mock trial team within the American Mock Trial Association. As of the 2022–2023 season, the University of Maryland, Baltimore County is ranked #9 in the nation. In 2019, UMBC advanced to the National Championship Tournament, placing eighth in their division. In 2021, UMBC won the American Mock Trial Association (AMTA) National Championship Tournament, defeating Yale University in one of the closest final rounds in AMTA history. In the 2021–2022 season, UMBC again advanced to the National Championship Tournament, but failed to place in their division.

UMBC competitor Sydney Gaskins also competed at Trial by Combat, the one-on-one competition for AMTA competitors hosted by UCLA Law and Drexel Law. As of the 2022 tournament, Gaskins is the only individual to have competed at Trial by Combat three times.

UMBC head coach Benjamin Garmoe hosts the Mock Review, a podcast discussing undergraduate mock trial and associated matters.

== Residential life ==
=== Campus housing ===
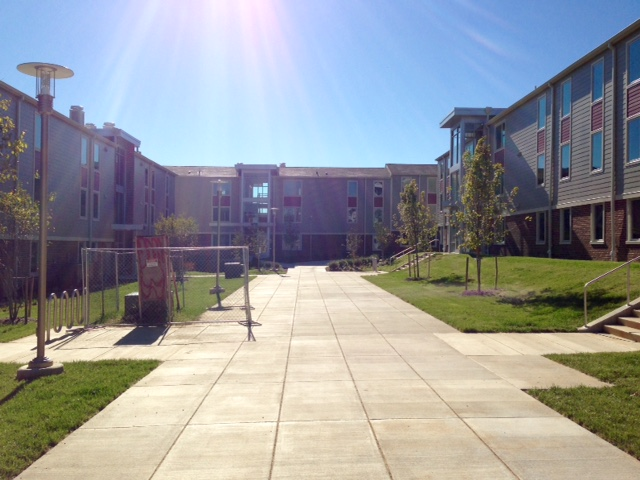
West Hill Apartments, North Campus

There are ten housing areas housing approximately 3,900 students, which are: Potomac Hall, Chesapeake Hall, Erickson Hall, Harbor Hall, Patapsco Hall, Susquehanna Hall, Hillside Apartments, Terrace Apartments, Walker Avenue Apartments, West Hill Apartments.

=== Off-campus housing ===
Although 71% of first-year undergraduate students are reported to live on campus, UMBC is known as a commuter campus where approximately 65% of the entire student population lives off campus, often in neighboring communities. These students are provided specialized programs and services through the Off Campus Student Services (OCSS) office. Popular locations for students include Catonsville and Arbutus. Popular apartment complexes include the Westland Garden Apartment & Town homes, and the Colony Hill Apartments located 1.5, and 2.5 miles away from campus, respectively. The UMBC Transit lines serves many neighborhoods. Students also live in numerous Baltimore neighborhoods, such as Beechfield, Oaklee, Irvington, Yale Heights, and Edmondson.

== Chess ==
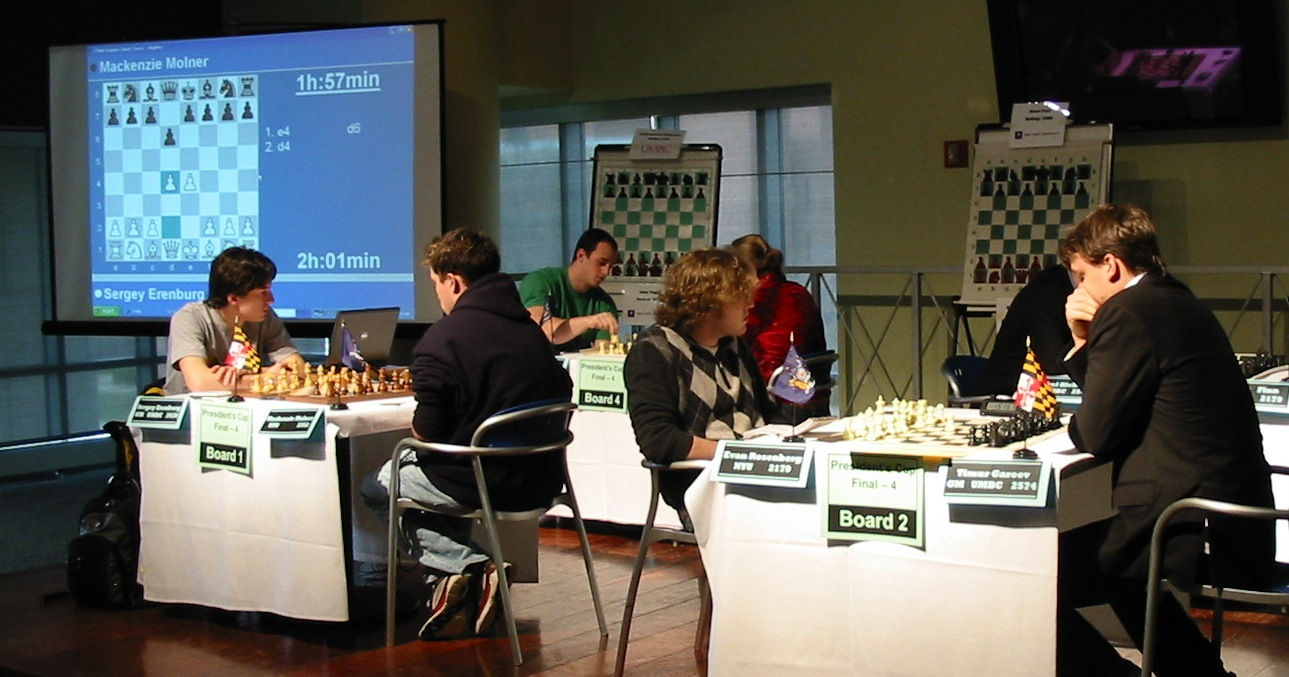
UMBC versus New York University at the 2008 Final Four.

UMBC has won the Pan American Chess Tournament 9 times in 13 years (1996–2009). The school provides substantial chess scholarships to outstanding high school graduate players at the International or Grandmaster level. Former UMBC team captain GM Alexander Onischuk has gone on to become US Champion in 2006. Professor of Computer Science Alan Sherman has been instrumental in building up the UMBC chess dynasty by recruiting players from around the world. UMBC hosts two annual open chess tournaments, the UMBC Open (March) and the UMBC Championship (September).

== Athletics ==
The Maryland–Baltimore County (UMBC) athletic teams are called the Retrievers. The university is a member of the Division I level of the National Collegiate Athletic Association (NCAA), primarily competing in the America East Conference since the 2003–04 academic year. The Retrievers previously competed in the Northeast Conference (NEC) from 1998–99 to 2002–03; and in the Big South Conference from 1992–93 to 1997–98; while they also competed in the Mason–Dixon Conference at the NCAA Division II ranks: the first variation of it from 1972–73 to 1977–78; and the second variation from 1983–84 to 1987–88.

UMBC competes in 17 intercollegiate varsity sports: Men's sports include baseball, basketball, cross country, lacrosse, soccer, swimming & diving and track & field (indoor and outdoor); while women's sports include basketball, cross country, lacrosse, soccer, softball, swimming & diving, track & field (indoor and outdoor) and volleyball.

=== Accomplishments ===
In 2009, the men's lacrosse team secured their fifth consecutive outright or shared America East regular season championship and their third America East tournament championship in four years. UMBC has secured a berth in the NCAA tournament each of the past four seasons. In 2007, the unseeded Retrievers upset seventh-seeded Maryland, 13–9, in the NCAA tournament to advance to the Division I second round for the first, and so far only, time in school history.

In 2010, a contest was launched to find a new logo for Athletics. In May 2010, the UMBC Athletic Department unveiled a new logo for the Retrievers created by Jim Lord.

The school spent $67 million in January 2016 on a new event center completed in Winter 2018. This new event center hosts athletic events such as basketball games, as well as concerts.

The Retrievers’ Men's Basketball team, on March 16, 2018, during the 2018 NCAA men's basketball tournament became the first No. 16 seed in the history of the competition to defeat a No. 1 seed, defeating the Virginia Cavaliers 74–54. They advanced to the Round of 32 for the first time in school history, where they were eliminated by Kansas State.

=== Soccer ===
UMBC is the first team in tournament history to win four consecutive road games and to post shutouts in four consecutive games.

UMBC Women's Soccer Team went 13–5–2 in their 2013 season, tying for the regular-season conference title then winning the conference tournament. This was their first American East Conference title. They then made their first NCAA tournament appearance in 2013, where they lost to #1-ranked VA Tech 2–0 in the first round. This was an improvement considering the team had a cumulative record of 3–39–9 in their previous three years.
