= Violetville, Baltimore =

Coordinates: 39°16′4″N 76°40′28″W

Violetville
- Neighborhood of Baltimore
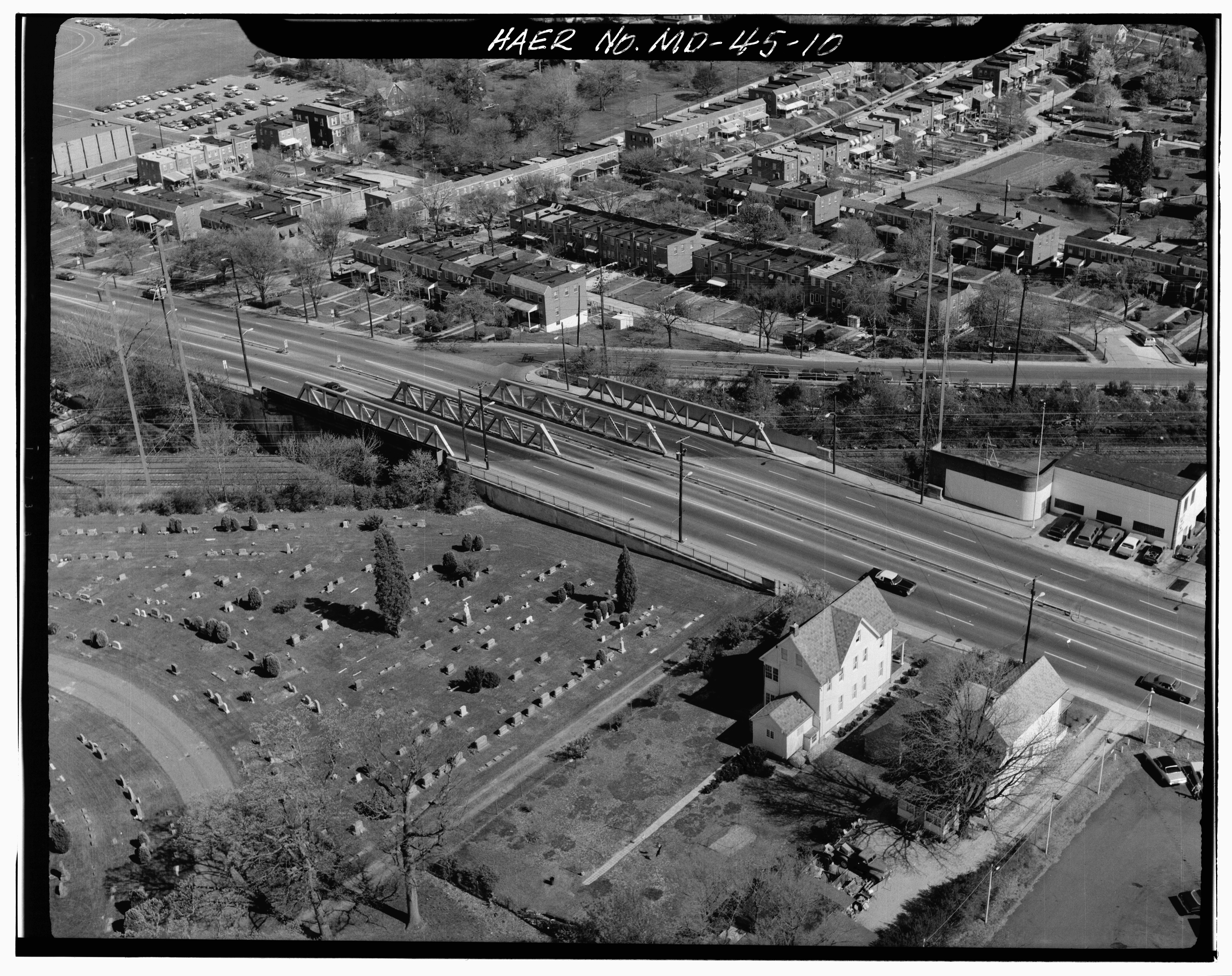
- An aerial view of Violetville in 1977

- Location within Baltimore
- Country: United States
- State: Maryland
- City: Baltimore
- Named after: German double Parma violets raised by Carl Fritze in the late 1800s
- Time zone: UTC-5 (Eastern)
  - Summer (DST): EDT
- ZIP code: 21229
- Area code: 410, 443, and 667

Violetville (also known as the Village of Violetville) is a neighborhood in Southwest Baltimore, Maryland and Baltimore County. The community is characterized by its "well-kept 1950s and 60s era rowhouses and older farmhouses that date back to the turn of the previous century."

In 1958, the community united to form a strong and feisty community association. Filbert Field (what is currently known as Violetville Park) was established and various recreational programs were created. Violetville became known for its intense Little League competition, for outspoken members of its community association, and for an enthusiasm for outdoor Christmas lights. In the spring, a parade and street fair celebrate the beginning of the Little League and softball seasons.

Violetville was named "Best Neighborhood in Baltimore" by the City Paper in 2005. The Baltimore Sun named Violetville a "Hidden Gem" community in the November 13, 2009, edition of the paper.

In 2006, the Violetville Community Association voted to allow residents of the Baltimore City neighborhood of St. Agnes to join the association. In 2019, several neighbors in Violetville formed a new community wellness association called, Village of Violetville, Inc.

== See also ==
List of Baltimore neighborhoods
