= Maryland Route 166 =

State highway in Baltimore County, Maryland, United States

Maryland Route 166
- Maryland Route 166 highlighted in red

Route information
- Maintained by MDSHA
- Length: 2.71 mi (4.36 km)
- Existed: 1927–present

Major junctions
- South end: I-195 in Arbutus
- MD 372 in Catonsville
- North end: MD 144 in Catonsville

Location
- Country: United States
- State: Maryland
- Counties: Baltimore

Highway system
- Maryland highway system; Interstate; US; State; Scenic Byways
| ← MD 165 | → MD 168 |

Maryland Route 166 (MD 166) is a state highway in the U.S. state of Maryland. The state highway runs 2.71 miles (4.36 km) from Interstate 195 (I-195) in Arbutus north to MD 144 in Catonsville. MD 166 consists of two sections: a short freeway section that serves as a northern continuation of I-195 and provides access to the University of Maryland, Baltimore County (UMBC), and a segment of Rolling Road, a major north–south highway in western Baltimore County. Rolling Road dates to the colonial era as a highway used to transport tobacco from plantations to river ports. North Rolling Road, which connects Catonsville with Woodlawn and Milford Mill, has always been a county highway. South Rolling Road was constructed as a state highway by the early 1920s between what were to become U.S. Route 1 (US 1) and US 40. Parts of South Rolling Road were transferred to county maintenance after they were severed by the construction of I-95 and a freeway relocation of the southern end of MD 166 in the early 1970s.

== Route description ==
MD 166 begins as a continuation of the four-lane Metropolitan Boulevard freeway at the northern terminus of I-195 just north of the Interstate's interchange with I-95. The highway passes under Selford Road and has a partial interchange with UMBC Boulevard that allows access to the UMBC campus to and from the south. MD 166 curves northwest over the ramp from southbound UMBC Boulevard and the freeway's carriageways split around a park and ride facility as the freeway terminates at South Rolling Road. MD 166 continues north along two-lane undivided South Rolling Road. The highway meets the western end of MD 372 (Wilkens Avenue) and passes between Rolling Road Golf Course on the east and the Catonsville Campus of the Community College of Baltimore County to the west. MD 166 temporarily expands to four lanes between Valley Road and Bloomsbury Avenue, between which the highway passes west of Catonsville High School. The highway narrows and passes along the edge of the Central Catonsville and Summit Park Historic District before veering north at Hilton Avenue and reaching its northern terminus at MD 144 (Frederick Road) west of downtown Catonsville.

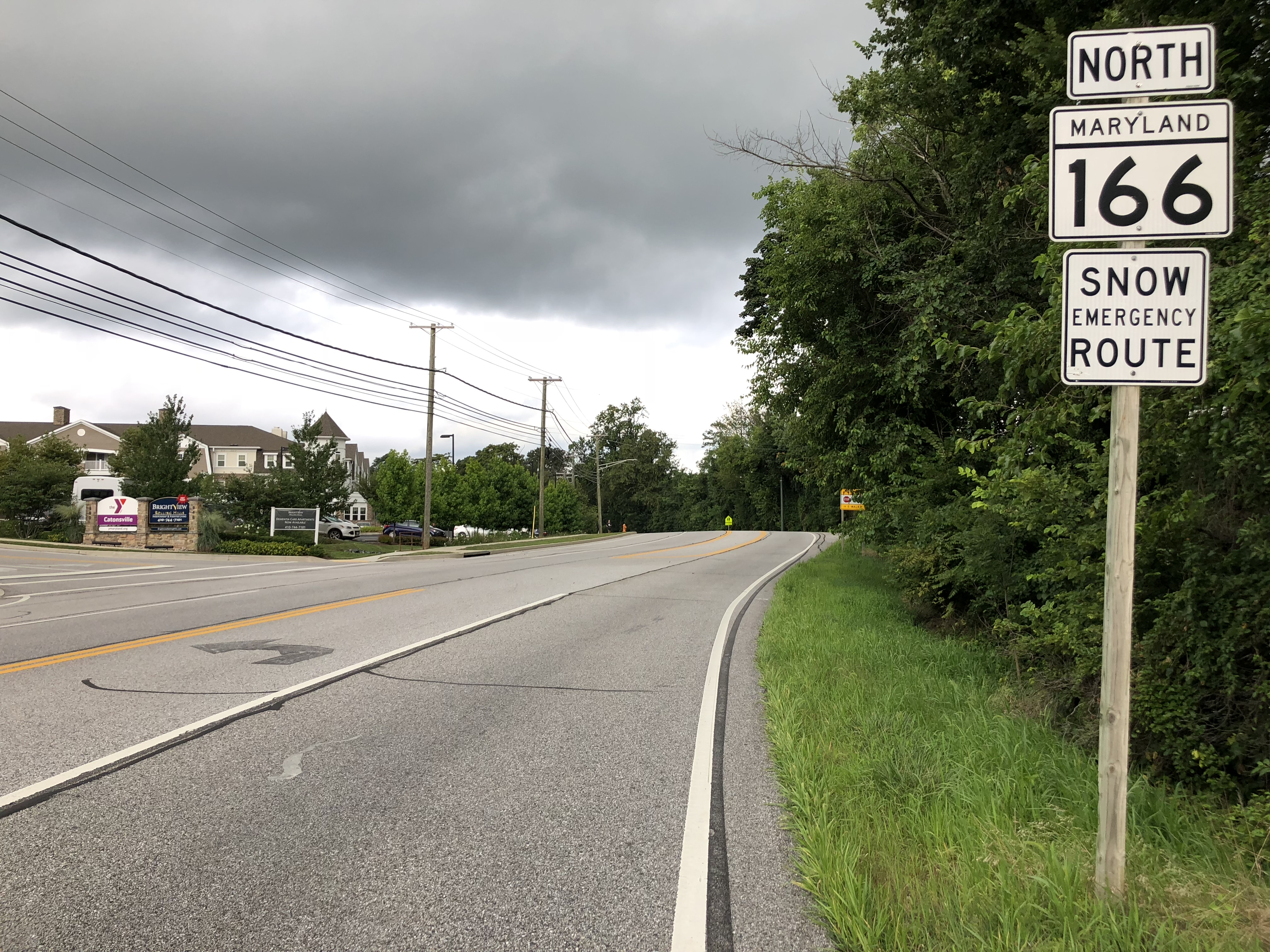
View north along MD 166 (Rolling Road) in Catonsville

There are two disjoint sections of South Rolling Road that are not part of MD 166. The highway begins in the village of St. Denis on a curve at East Street and South Street. South Street leads west and then south to US 1 and East Street provides access to the St. Denis station on MARC's Camden Line. South Rolling Road crosses over CSX's Baltimore Terminal Subdivision railroad line just west of the train station. The highway makes a right-angle turn east at Railroad Avenue and another right-angle turn north at Cedar Avenue and Arlington Avenue; the latter street provides access to the train station from the north. South Rolling Road meets the western end of Francis Avenue before reaching a dead end adjacent to the I-195–I-95 interchange. South Rolling Road begins again on the north side of the interchange next to the UMBC Training Centers and Tech Incubators. The highway makes a turn at Selford Road just west of that road's crossing of MD 166 and meets the state highway at a pair of carriageways on either side of the park and ride facility.

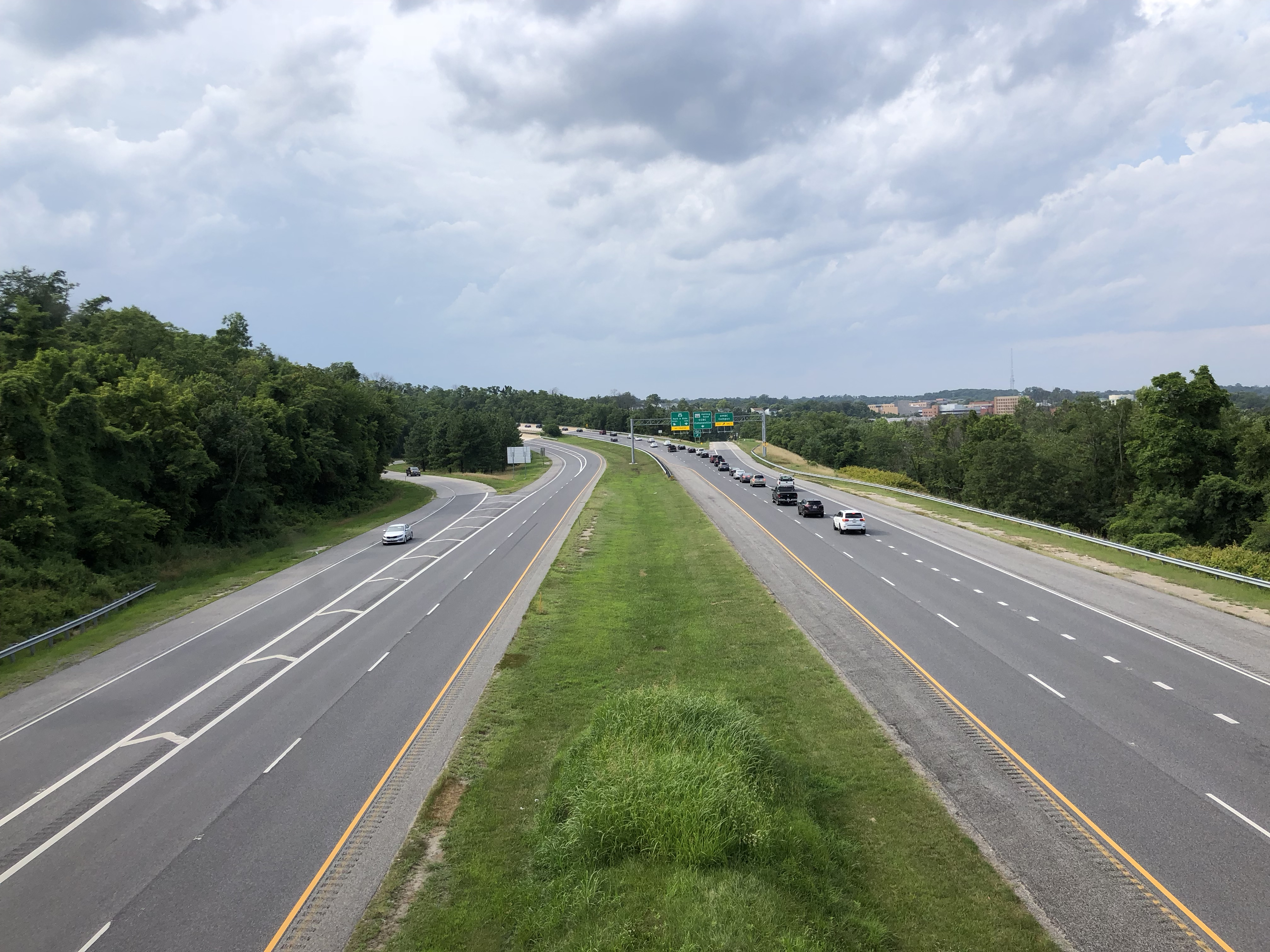
View north along MD 166 (Metropolitan Boulevard) from the Selford Road overpass in Catonsville

North Rolling Road begins at MD 144 (Frederick Road) several blocks west of MD 166 on the west side of Catonsville. The two-lane road heads north through a residential area where it intersects Edmondson Avenue. North Rolling Road expands to a four-lane divided highway at Old Frederick Road and intersects US 40 (Baltimore National Pike) within a commercial area. The highway becomes an undivided, two-lane road with wide lanes and passes through residential areas in the western part of Catonsville. North Rolling Road expands to four lanes again at Crosby Road, then passes a large recreational park and additional residential areas. It then passes a group of office buildings and enters Woodlawn upon crossing Johnnycake Road. North Rolling Road gains a divider as it passes under I-70. The highway enters a commercial area featuring Security Square Mall and an intersection with Security Boulevard, which heads east as MD 122. North Rolling Road continues as a four-lane undivided highway with occasional center turn lane as it enters Windsor Mill and passes between business parks to the east and residential subdivisions to the west. The highway reduces to two lanes north of Windsor Boulevard. North Rolling Road has an oblique intersection with Windsor Mill Road in the village of Hebbville and intersects Milford Mill Road before meeting MD 26 (Liberty Road) at the hamlet of Rockdale east of Randallstown. The highway reaches its northern terminus at Old Court Road between Randallstown and Pikesville.

MD 166 is a part of the National Highway System as a principal arterial for its entire length. North Rolling Road is also a principal arterial from MD 144 in Catonsville to MD 26 at Rockdale.

== History ==
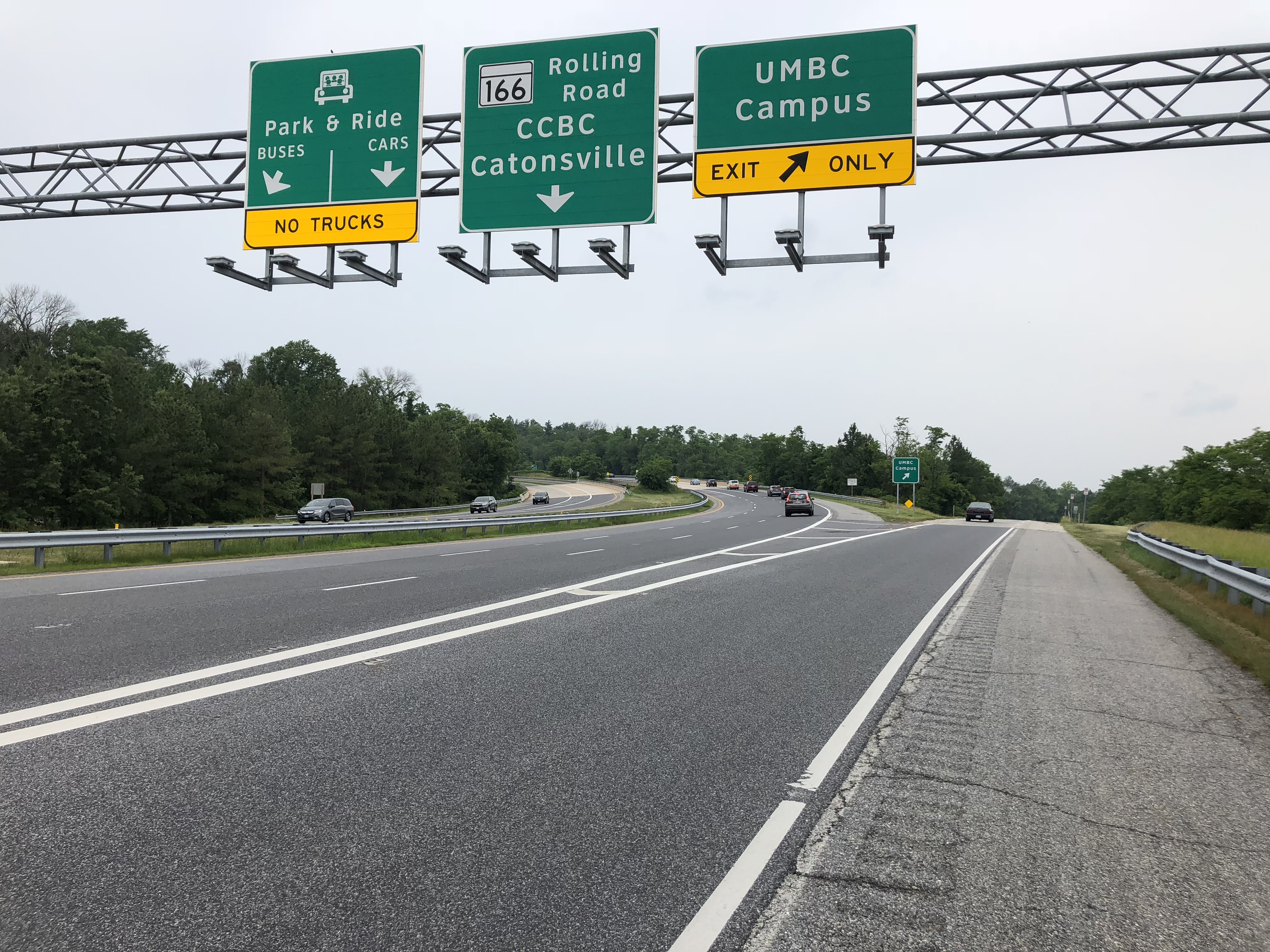
MD 166 northbound at the University of Maryland, Baltimore County

Several rolling roads were established in Maryland in the early 18th century for the transportation of tobacco in casks, or hogsheads, from plantations to river ports. These casks were pulled along the road by slaves and later oxen before this method of freight transportation was made obsolete by the introduction of sturdy wagons. The rolling road in western Baltimore County connecting Rockdale with Elkridge, which was likely built in 1714 by William Summers, is the only such road in Maryland whose name survived to modern times. South Rolling Road was improved as a macadam road from Washington Boulevard (later US 1) to Frederick Road (later US 40 and now MD 144) by 1921. In St. Denis, the highway that was to become MD 166 followed modern Arlington Avenue and East Street south across a grade crossing of the B&O Railroad to its southern terminus at Washington Boulevard. MD 166 was moved to modern South Rolling Road when the highway's bridge over the railroad was built in 1931. By 1933, North Rolling Road was upgraded to an improved county highway. North Rolling Road would be expanded to a divided highway in Woodlawn around 1981. Unlike South Rolling Road, North Rolling Road has never been a part of the state highway system.

The next major changes to MD 166 came in the early 1970s with the construction of I-95 and Metropolitan Boulevard, the latter of which went under construction in 1969. When I-95 was completed through Arbutus in 1971, South Rolling Road was split. Metropolitan Boulevard opened from the US 1 ramps northwest through the I-95 interchange to an intersection with Sulphur Spring Road just south of the modern Selford Road overpass in August 1974. South Rolling Road was truncated in St. Denis by the construction of the US 1 ramps. The freeway was extended to its present terminus at Rolling Road and the ramps to UMBC Boulevard were constructed in 1975. Metropolitan Boulevard south of the I-95 interchange was marked as a second segment of MD 46—disjoint from the section between MD 295 and Baltimore/Washington International Airport—from when it opened. North of I-95, the freeway was marked as a relocation of MD 166. MD 166 was extended to US 1 and replaced that segment of MD 46 by 1981. MD 166 was truncated to its present southern terminus when I-195 was completed in June 1990.

== Major intersections ==
The entire route is in Baltimore County. All exits are unnumbered.

| Location | mi | km | Destinations | Notes |
|---|---|---|---|---|
| Arbutus | 0.00 | 0.00 | I-195 east to I-95 – BWI Marshall Airport, Baltimore, Washington | Southern terminus; Metropolitan Boulevard continues east as I-195 |
| Catonsville | 0.22 | 0.35 | UMBC Campus | Northbound exit and southbound entrance via UMBC Boulevard |
| Catonsville | 0.72 | 1.16 | Rolling Road south – Arbutus, Park & Ride | |
| Catonsville | 0.72 | 1.16 | Northern terminus of freeway section | |
| Catonsville | 0.95 | 1.53 | MD 372 east (Wilkens Avenue) | Western terminus of MD 372 |
| Catonsville | 2.71 | 4.36 | MD 144 (Frederick Road) | Northern terminus |
1.000 mi = 1.609 km; 1.000 km = 0.621 mi: Incomplete access
