= Milford Mill, Maryland =

- Census-designated place
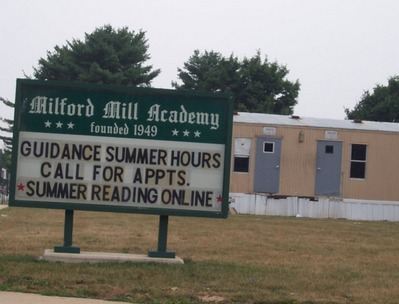
- Milford Mill Academy in Milford Mill, Maryland

- Coordinates: 39°20′50″N 76°45′39″W
- Country: United States
- State: Maryland
- County: Baltimore

Area
  - Total: 6.96 sq mi (18.02 km^{2})
  - Land: 6.95 sq mi (17.99 km^{2})
  - Water: 0.012 sq mi (0.03 km^{2})
- Elevation: 495 ft (151 m)

Population (2020)
  - Total: 30,622
  - Density: 4,409.4/sq mi (1,702.49/km^{2})
- Time zone: UTC−5 (Eastern (EST))
  - Summer (DST): UTC−4 (EDT)
- ZIP Codes: 21244, 21133, 21208
- FIPS code: 24-52562
- GNIS feature ID: 1867296

Milford Mill is an unincorporated community and census-designated place in Baltimore County, Maryland, United States. Per the 2020 census, the population was 30,622.

According to the United States Census Bureau, the CDP has a total area of 7.0 square miles (18 km^{2}), all of it land.

The true name of the area is "Milford", but the name "Milford Mill" has stuck with the community. The name "Milford Mill" comes from the name of an old mill located in nearby Pikesville along Milford Mill Road.

== Geography ==
Milford Mill is near the Baltimore County communities of Pikesville, Randallstown, and Woodlawn, around the intersection of Liberty Road and Milford Mill Road. Some areas of Milford Mill are as follows:

=== Windsor Mill ===
Windsor Mill is an area near Woodlawn that is similar to Milford Mill. Some of the main roads in the area include Windsor Mill Road, Windsor Boulevard, and Rolling Road. Landmarks in this area include Windsor Mill Middle School and Rutherford Business Park.

=== Rockdale ===
Rockdale is mostly near Liberty Road and Lord Baltimore Drive to Rolling Road coming off from I-695. Landmarks in this area include schools like Scotts Branch Elementary and Old Court Middle School.

== Demographics ==
Historical population
Census	Pop.	Note	%±
1980	20,354		—
1990	22,547		10.8%
2000	26,527		17.7%
2010	29,042		9.5%
2020	30,622		5.4%
U.S. Decennial Census; 2010 2020

=== Racial and ethnic composition ===
Milford Mill CDP, Maryland – Racial and ethnic composition Note: the US Census treats Hispanic/Latino as an ethnic category. This table excludes Latinos from the racial categories and assigns them to a separate category. Hispanics/Latinos may be of any race.
Race / Ethnicity (NH = Non-Hispanic)	Pop 2000	Pop 2010	Pop 2020	% 2000	% 2010	% 2020
White alone (NH)	4,115	2,253	1,696	15.51%	7.76%	5.54%
Black or African American alone (NH)	20,870	24,333	25,360	78.67%	83.79%	82.82%
Native American or Alaska Native alone (NH)	55	55	57	0.21%	0.19%	0.19%
Asian alone (NH)	443	686	698	1.67%	2.36%	2.28%
Native Hawaiian or Pacific Islander alone (NH)	4	6	7	0.02%	0.02%	0.02%
Other race alone (NH)	59	46	172	0.22%	0.16%	0.56%
Mixed race or Multiracial (NH)	498	590	885	1.88%	2.03%	2.89%
Hispanic or Latino (any race)	483	1,073	1,747	1.82%	3.69%	5.71%
Total	26,527	29,042	30,622	100.00%	100.00%	100.00%

=== 2020 census ===
As of the 2020 census, Milford Mill had a population of 30,622. The median age was 36.9 years. 23.7% of residents were under the age of 18 and 14.6% of residents were 65 years of age or older. For every 100 females there were 80.4 males, and for every 100 females age 18 and over there were 73.8 males age 18 and over.

99.1% of residents lived in urban areas, while 0.9% lived in rural areas.

There were 11,853 households in Milford Mill, of which 33.4% had children under the age of 18 living in them. Of all households, 30.7% were married-couple households, 18.3% were households with a male householder and no spouse or partner present, and 44.8% were households with a female householder and no spouse or partner present. About 29.4% of all households were made up of individuals and 10.6% had someone living alone who was 65 years of age or older.

There were 12,531 housing units, of which 5.4% were vacant. The homeowner vacancy rate was 1.6% and the rental vacancy rate was 5.9%.

Racial composition as of the 2020 census
Race	Number	Percent
White	1,879	6.1%
Black or African American	25,564	83.5%
American Indian and Alaska Native	109	0.4%
Asian	706	2.3%
Native Hawaiian and Other Pacific Islander	9	0.0%
Some other race	1,052	3.4%
Two or more races	1,303	4.3%
Hispanic or Latino (of any race)	1,747	5.7%

=== 2000 census ===
At the 2000 census there were 26,527 people, 10,467 households, and 6,855 families in the CDP. The population density was 3,804.3 inhabitants per square mile (1,468.8/km^{2}). There were 11,217 housing units at an average density of 1,608.7 per square mile (621.1/km^{2}). The racial makeup of the CDP was 16.19% White, 79.06% African American, 0.21% Native American, 1.67% Asian, 0.02% Pacific Islander, 0.74% from other races, and 2.11% from two or more races. Hispanic or Latino of any race were 1.82%.

Of the 10,467 households 34.6% had children under the age of 18 living with them, 35.4% were married couples living together, 24.6% had a female householder with no husband present, and 34.5% were non-families. 27.5% of households were one person and 5.4% were one person aged 65 or older. The average household size was 2.49 and the average family size was 3.02.

The age distribution was 27.7% under the age of 18, 8.9% from 18 to 24, 33.2% from 25 to 44, 21.0% from 45 to 64, and 9.1% 65 or older. The median age was 33 years. For every 100 females, there were 82.9 males. For every 100 females age 18 and over, there were 76.2 males.

The median household income was $43,976 and the median family income was $49,177. Males had a median income of $33,725 versus $31,230 for females. The per capita income for the CDP was $20,195. About 6.7% of families and 8.3% of the population were below the poverty line, including 8.8% of those under age 18 and 10.0% of those age 65 or over.

== Government and infrastructure ==
The Federal Bureau of Investigation (FBI) Baltimore field office is located in Milford Mill.

== Education ==
Baltimore County Public Schools operates public schools.

== See also ==
- The Woodlands Golf Course
- Woodlawn-Rockdale-Milford Mills, Maryland, 1960 census-designated place
