= Thomas Dixon (architect) =

American Presbyterian architect

Thomas Dixon (1819 - July 25, 1886) was a Presbyterian architect born in Wilmington, Delaware and one of the founders of the Baltimore chapter of AIA. He was the father of minister Thomas Freeman Dixon, an 1893 graduate of Princeton Theological Seminary. He partnered with his brother, James M. Dixon, from 1851 until James's death in 1863. In 1871, he partnered with another well-known Baltimore architect Charles L. Carson for some time doing business from their offices at 117 Baltimore Street as Thomas Dixon and Charles L. Carson until sometime before 1877 when the partnership was dissolved. In 1827, he was elected Honorary Academician at the National Academy of Design.

He was married to Rebecca Howard, with whom he had one son: Rev. L. Freeman Dixon. He was living at 253 North Eutaw Street in Baltimore at the time of his death.

== Selected works ==
- Mount Vernon Place United Methodist Church and Asbury House, North Charles Street and East Mount Vernon Place, (East Monument Street), opposite the Washington Monument, (1872), listed on the National Register of Historic Places (NRHP) in 1971.
- St. Stephen's Episcopal Church (Earleville, Maryland) (1870-1874), listed on the National Register of Historic Places in 1982.
- Aged Women's and Aged Men's Homes, now the Pickersgill Retirement Community, Towson, Maryland
- Dixon Hill neighborhood of Baltimore
- Centenary Methodist Episcopal Church, South, in St. Louis, Missouri, NRHP-listed in 1996
- Lesley-Travers Mansion in New Castle, Delaware
- Grand Opera House in Wilmington, Delaware
- Baltimore County Circuit Courthouse, at Towson, Maryland, 1854.
- Episcopal Church of the Ascension, 1215 Massachusetts Avenue, N.W., Washington, D.C. (Dixon, Thomas), NRHP-listed
- Grace United Methodist Church, 9th and West Streets, Wilmington, Delaware (Dixon, Thomas, Esq.), NRHP-listed
- Sheppard and Enoch Pratt Hospital and Gatehouse, (North) Charles Street Avenue, Towson, Maryland, Baltimore County, (Dixon, Thomas & James M.), NRHP-listed
- St. Mary's Episcopal Church/Woodlawn, 5610 Dogwood Road, Woodlawn, Maryland, Baltimore County, (Dixon & Carson), NRHP-listed
