= Frederick Road =

Frederick Road may refer to:

- Frederick Road (Rockville) in Maryland, United States
- Frederick Road (Baltimore) in Maryland, United States
