= Hebbville =

Hebbville may refer to a community in North America:

- Hebbville, Nova Scotia, Canada
- Hebbville, Maryland, United States
