= Maryland Route 144 =

State highway in Maryland, US

Maryland Route 144

Route information
- Maintained by MDSHA and Baltimore DOT
- Existed: 1952–present
- Tourist routes: Historic National Road; Chesapeake and Ohio Canal Scenic Byway; Antietam Campaign Scenic Byway

Location
- Country: United States
- State: Maryland
- Counties: Allegany, Washington, Frederick, Carroll, Howard, Baltimore, Baltimore City

Highway system
- Maryland highway system; Interstate; US; State; Scenic Byways
← MD 140	→ MD 145

Maryland Route 144 (MD 144) is a collection of state highways in the U.S. state of Maryland. These highways are sections of old alignment of U.S. Route 40 (US 40) between Cumberland and Baltimore. Along with US 40 Scenic, US 40 Alternate, and a few sections of county-maintained highway, MD 144 is assigned to what was once the main highway between the two cities, connecting those endpoints with Hancock, Hagerstown, Frederick, New Market, Mount Airy, Ellicott City, and Catonsville. MD 144 has seven disjoint sections of mainline highway that pass through the Appalachian Mountains in Allegany and Washington counties and the rolling Piedmont of Frederick, Carroll, Howard, and Baltimore counties.

== Route description ==
There are seven mainline sections of MD 144:

- MD 144 in Allegany County runs 17.55 miles (28.24 km) from MD 807 in Cumberland east to US 40 Scenic east of Flintstone. The state highway generally parallels I-68 and crosses over the freeway multiple times as both highways pass through mountainous creek valleys and over Martin Mountain and Polish Mountain.
- MD 144WB runs 5.91 miles (9.51 km) from I-68 west of Hancock to I-70 east of Hancock. The state highway was assigned in the mid-1960s following the completion of I-70 and the new alignment of US 40 on either side of Hancock.
- MD 144WA runs 1.47 miles (2.37 km) from US 40 west of Hagerstown to Western Maryland Parkway just west of the city limits of Hagerstown.
- MD 144FA runs 5.57 miles (8.96 km) from the intersection of Patrick Street and Jefferson Street in Frederick east to I-70 near Bartonsville.
- MD 144FB runs 1.41 miles (2.27 km) from the west town limit of New Market east to MD 75. This state-maintained segment of old US 40 lies between two county-maintained segments of the road in eastern Frederick County.
- MD 144A runs 17.20 miles (27.68 km) from MD 27 in Mount Airy east to US 40 in Ellicott City. The state highway briefly passes through Frederick and Carroll counties before serving as the main east–west surface highway of northern Howard County.
- MD 144 runs 8.62 miles (13.87 km) from the Howard–Baltimore county line at the Patapsco River east to US 1 in Baltimore. A county-maintained segment of Frederick Road continues west through Ellicott City to a junction with US 40 a short distance east of MD 144A.

MD 144 is a part of the National Highway System as a principal arterial in two sections. The first section runs from the western terminus of MD 144FA at Jefferson Street east to I-70 and US 40 within Frederick. The second section runs from North Rolling Road in Catonsville to the highway's eastern terminus at US 1 in Baltimore.

=== Cumberland–Flintstone ===
Maryland Route 144
- Location: Cumberland–Flintstone
- Length: 17.55 mi (28.24 km)
- Tourist routes: Historic National Road

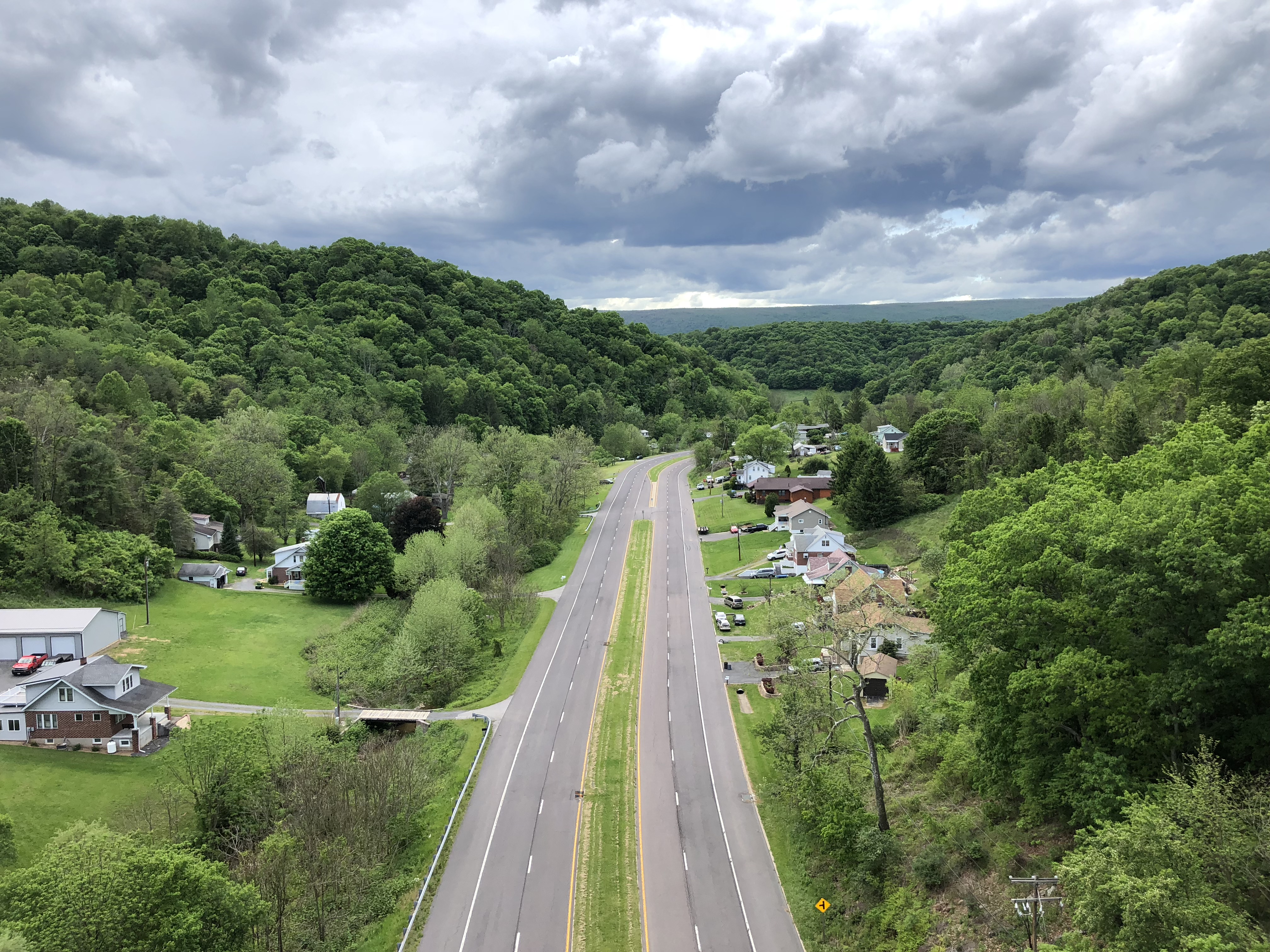
View west along MD 144 from I-68/US 40 in Pleasant Grove, east of Cumberland

MD 144 begins at an intersection with MD 807 (Bedford Road) a short distance north of the Cumberland city limits. The state highway heads east as two-lane undivided Naves Cross Road, passing through a pair of ridges before meeting a pair of ramps to and from westbound I-68 (National Freeway) and heading north of a park and ride lot. Naves Cross Road continues east as MD 807A, while MD 144 turns south onto Christie Road to pass under I-68. Christie Road continues south while MD 144 turns east onto Ali Ghan Road, passing to the south of a park and ride lot. The state highway crosses Evitts Creek before receiving an exit ramp from eastbound I-68 and joins US 220 in a short concurrency. US 220 turns north onto its bypass of Bedford Road while MD 144 continues east, meeting I-68 at Exit 47, a diamond interchange.

Within the interchange, MD 144 becomes National Pike and expands to a four-lane divided highway that follows the valley of Elk Lick Run. The state highway passes under I-68 and reduces to a two-lane undivided highway at Hinkle Road. At Rocky Gap Road, MD 144 begins to closely parallel the eastbound lanes of I-68. The state highway leaves the valley of Elk Lick Run and ascends Martin Mountain. On the climb, MD 144 intersects Pleasant Valley Road, which meets I-68 at Exit 50 and leads to Rocky Gap State Park. At the top of Martin Mountain, the state highway crosses over I-68 and intersects Sunset Orchard Road, which leads to a ramp to westbound I-68. On the descent, MD 144 crosses I-68 again and receives a ramp from the eastbound direction of the freeway and the highways part ways around a quarry.

MD 144 curves around the quarry and rejoins the side of I-68 as the highway passes West Wilson Road and crosses a tributary of Flintstone Creek. The state highway leaves the freeway and passes through the unincorporated village of Flintstone, where the state highway intersects the Exit 56 ramps to and from eastbound I-68 and Black Valley Road, which leads to ramps for westbound I-68. MD 144 joins I-68 and Flintstone Creek in passing through a gap in Warrior Mountain. Gilpin Road, an older alignment of US 40 that is designated MD 144AE, begins to parallel the eastbound side of the state highway at Town Creek Road. The two surface highways cross Town Creek and begin to climb Polish Mountain, with MD 144 following a gentle curve while Gilpin Road follows a winding alignment. MD 144 intersects Gilpin Road as the highway begins the descent from the mountain. MD 144 and I-68 follow Pratt Hollow east between several ridges. The state highway crosses the freeway and over Pine Lick Hollow and closely parallels the westbound direction of I-68 before reaching its eastern terminus at US 40 Scenic (Old National Pike) just north of I-68 Exit 62, just west of Fifteen Mile Creek, and on the edge of Green Ridge State Forest.

=== Hancock ===
Maryland Route 144WB
- Location: Hancock
- Length: 5.91 mi (9.51 km)
- Tourist routes: Historic National Road; Chesapeake and Ohio Canal Scenic Byway

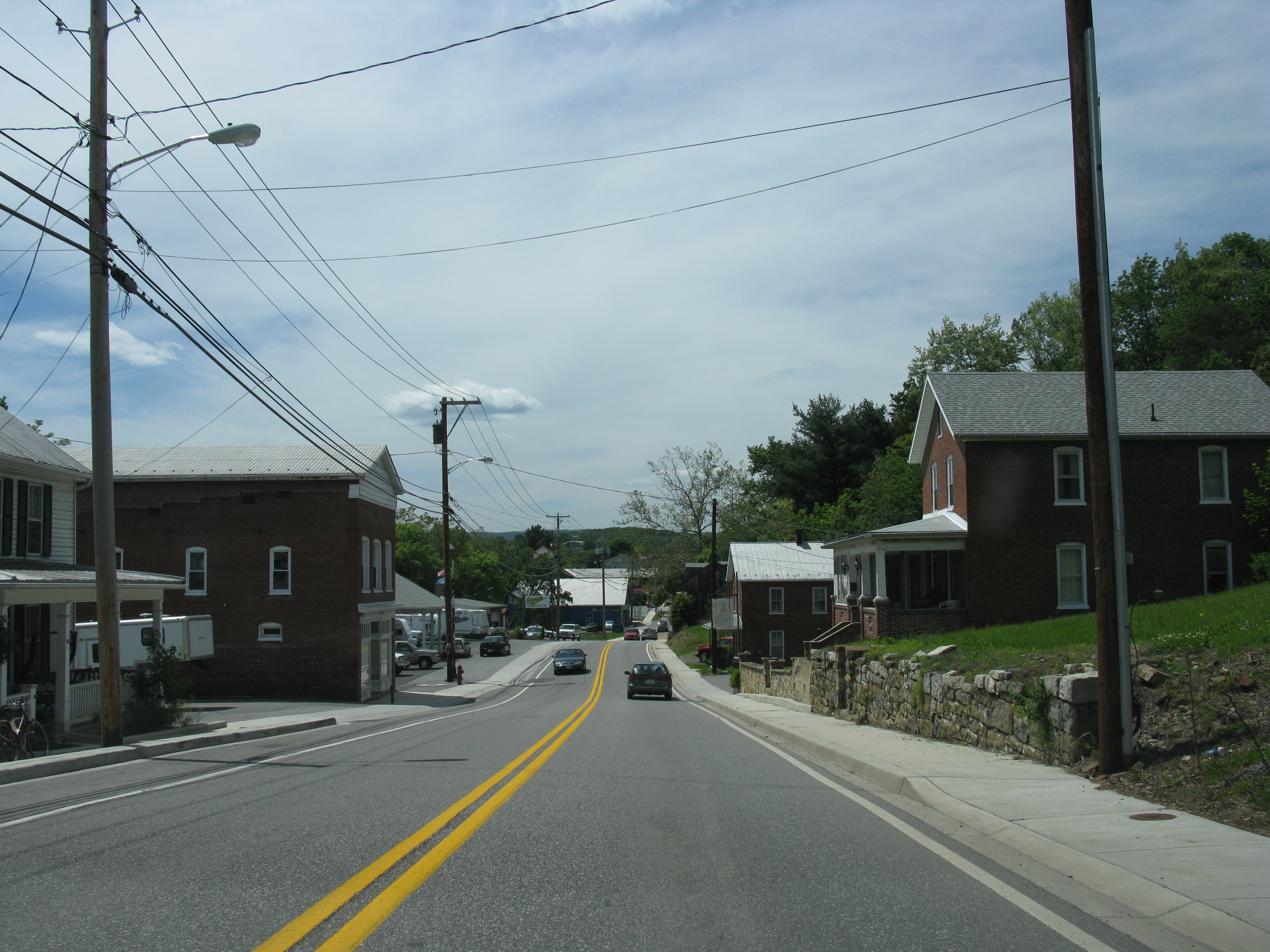
MD 144 in Hancock

MD 144 begins at Exit 77 of I-68 (National Freeway) north of Woodmont and west of Hancock. The state highway heads south through the diamond interchange to an intersection with US 40 Scenic (National Pike), at which MD 144 turns east as two-lane undivided Western Pike. The state highway intersects Woodmont Road and crosses Little Tonoloway Creek before ascending Tonoloway Ridge. East of the ridge, MD 144 passes through multiple curves through a mixture of farms and forest, intersecting Locher Road, which leads south to Fort Tonoloway State Park, before passing north of Hancock Middle-Senior High School at the town limits of Hancock. The state highway passes through a residential area before issuing a ramp to southbound US 522. MD 144 passes under US 522 itself, crosses Little Tonoloway Creek, and intersects Limestone Road, which is the old alignment of US 522 and unsigned MD 894.

MD 144 continues east as Main Street through downtown Hancock. Access to northbound US 522 as well as both I-70 and I-68 is provided by Virginia Avenue. MD 144 parallels both the Western Maryland Rail Trail and Chesapeake and Ohio Canal National Historical Park one block to the north through the downtown area. The state highway leaves the town limits and passes the C&O Canal's Hancock visitor center and a park and ride lot before crossing Tonoloway Creek. MD 144 reaches its eastern terminus at a partial interchange with I-70 (Eisenhower Memorial Highway). There is no direct access from MD 144 to westbound I-70 at Exit 3; that movement can be completed by turning around at Exit 5.

=== Hagerstown ===
Maryland Route 144WA
- Location: Hagerstown
- Length: 1.47 mi (2.37 km)

MD 144 begins at an intersection with US 40 (National Pike) between Huyett and Hagerstown. The state highway heads east as two-lane undivided Washington Street past farmland, residential subdivisions, and a cemetery. After crossing over I-81 (Maryland Veterans Memorial Highway) with no access, MD 144 enters an industrial area and reaches its eastern terminus at a roundabout with Western Maryland Parkway. Western Maryland Parkway, which is unsigned MD 910C heading north, is used to access US 40 and I-81. Washington Street continues east into the city of Hagerstown, where it meets US 40 again in the downtown area.

=== Frederick–Bartonsville ===
Maryland Route 144FA
- Location: Frederick–Bartonsville
- Length: 5.57 mi (8.96 km)
- Tourist routes: Historic National Road; Antietam Campaign Scenic Byway

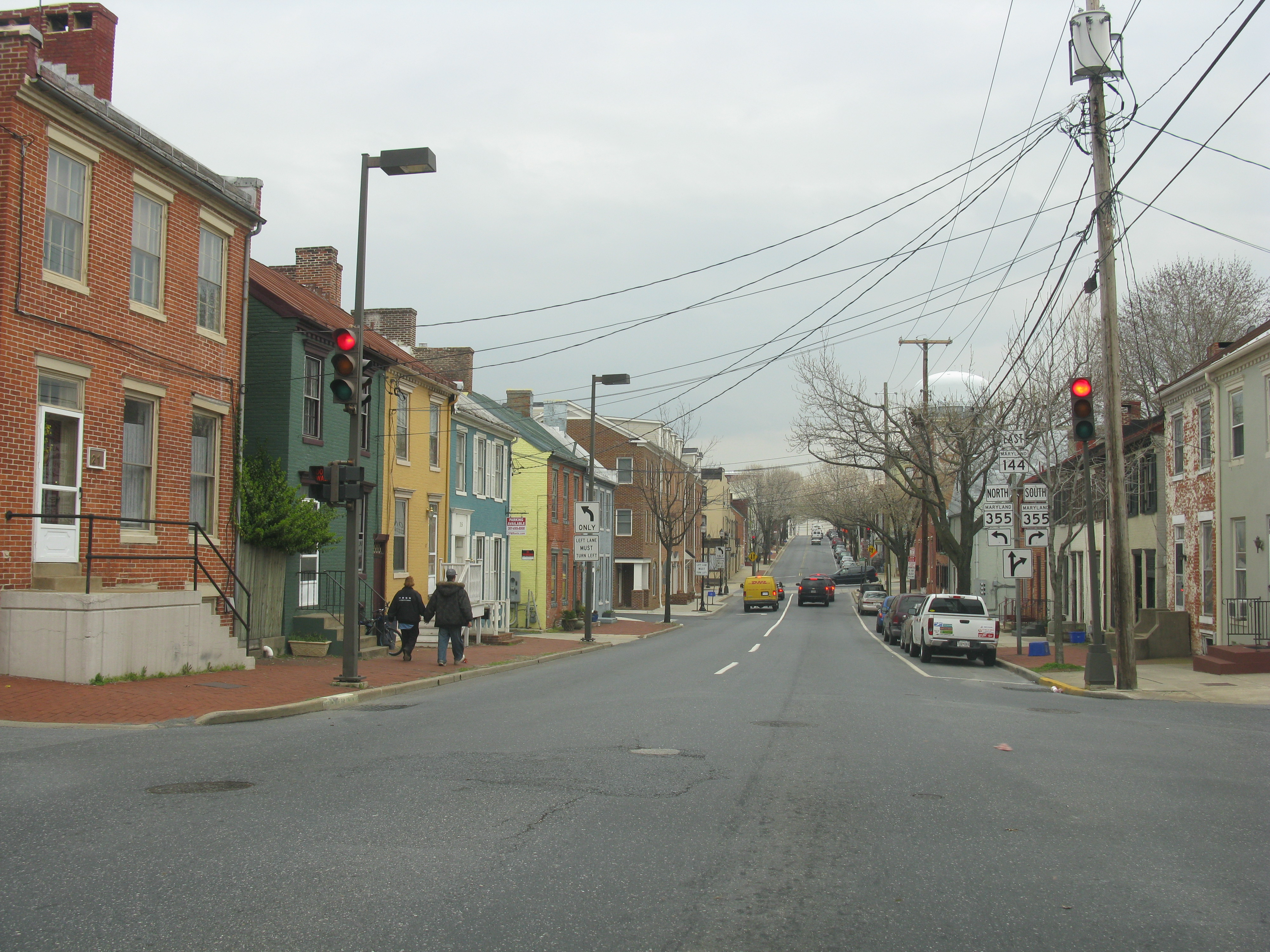
MD 144 eastbound in downtown Frederick

The old alignment of US 40 through Frederick begins at a partial cloverleaf interchange with the Frederick Freeway, which heads north from the interchange as US 15 and south as a concurrency of US 15 and US 40. Patrick Street heads east from the interchange as a four-lane undivided highway that splits into a one-way pair just beyond West College Terrace/Catoctin Avenue. The eastbound direction, which is signed as eastbound MD 144 at the split, follows municipally-maintained South Street. MD 144 in Frederick officially begins at the intersection of Patrick Street, which is one-way westbound, and Jefferson Street, which was formerly US 340. Both streets pass through the Frederick Historic District: Patrick Street crosses Carroll Creek into the commercial district, while South Street has a more residential flavor. Both streets intersect Market Street, the main north–south thoroughfare of the downtown area that was formerly MD 355. The eastbound direction of MD 144 turns north onto East Street, passing by the Frederick station serving the Frederick Branch of MARC's Brunswick Line and traversing Carroll Creek before meeting Patrick Street.

MD 144 heads east from downtown Frederick on two-lane undivided Patrick Street. The state highway crosses Carroll Creek and passes between a residential area to the south and the Frederick Fairgrounds to the north. MD 144 expands to a four-lane undivided street and continues east through an industrial area where the highway intersects Monocacy Boulevard, which is used to access westbound I-70 and Frederick Municipal Airport. Just before reaching I-70, the street's alignment continues straight as an unnamed road, unsigned MD 870G, that receives the westbound Exit 56 ramp from I-70 and is used to access Bowmans Farm Road. MD 144 reduces to two lanes and veers to the southeast to cross I-70 (Baltimore National Pike), then curves back to the original alignment ahead of ramps to and from eastbound I-70 at the intersection with Quinn Orchard Road.

MD 144 continues east as Old National Pike, a two-lane undivided road that is paralleled by an unused carriageway immediately to the north that serves as a park and ride and the original alignment further north, which is lined with scattered residences. The two southern carriageways cross the Monocacy River on bridges while the northernmost road dead ends at the site of the removed Jug Bridge. East of Bartonsville Road, MD 144 expands to a four-lane divided highway, with the westbound direction making use of what to the west was an unused carriageway. The original alignment, Baltimore Road, now parallels the highway to the south, while Long Branch parallels the highway to the north. MD 144 crosses Long Branch before approaching its eastern terminus. Westbound MD 144 receives a loop ramp from Exit 59 of westbound I-70. The old alignment, Old National Pike, heads north from the divided highway, passes under I-70, and turns east toward New Market as a county highway. MD 144 continues east to its terminus at Ijamsville Road, where the divided highway ends, with the eastbound direction becoming an entrance ramp to eastbound I-70.

=== New Market ===
Maryland Route 144FB
- Location: New Market
- Length: 0.31 mi (500 m)
- Tourist routes: Historic National Road

Old National Pike parallels I-70 as a county highway for about 3 miles (4.8 km) to the western town limits of New Market. The road heads east through New Market as Main Street, which is a municipal street that passes through the New Market Historic District, within which it intersects MD 874 (Prospect Street). MD 144 begins again at the east town limit of New Market, where it heads east as Old National Pike. The original alignment continues straight to a dead end while the state highway turns north and then east to its eastern terminus at MD 75 (Green Valley Road), which is used to access I-70. Old National Pike continues east as a county highway for about 6 miles (9.7 km) to Mount Airy on the Frederick–Carroll county line.

=== Mount Airy – Ellicott City ===
Maryland Route 144A
- Location: Mount Airy – Ellicott City
- Length: 17.20 mi (27.68 km)
- Tourist routes: Historic National Road

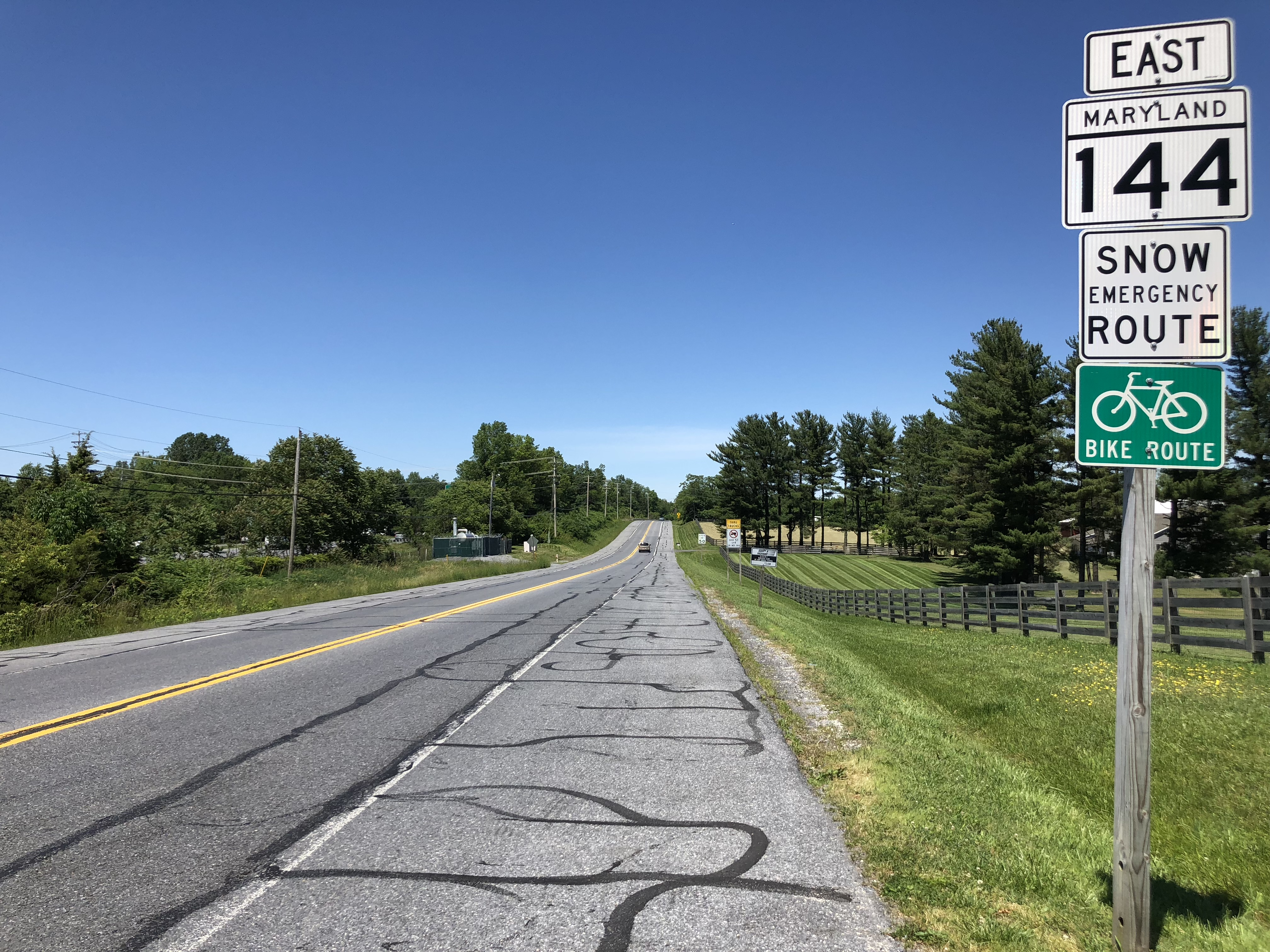
MD 144 eastbound past MD 27 in Mount Airy

MD 144 begins at an intersection with MD 27 (Ridge Road) just south of MD 27's interchange with I-70 south of Mount Airy. The state highway, known as Frederick Road, immediately turns north and after 0.07 miles (0.11 km) crosses the Frederick–Carroll County line. MD 144 passes Parr's Spring, the source of the Patapsco River, before curving to the east through residential subdivisions and closely paralleling the eastbound lanes of I-70. Shortly after crossing the Patapsco River and entering Howard County, the state highway veers away from the freeway and passes through a mix of farmland and scattered residences. MD 144 intersects Long Corner Road and Watersville Road before reaching Lisbon, where the highway meets MD 94 (Woodbine Road) at a roundabout. The state highway continues past Daisy Road and Morgan Station Road to Cooksville, where the highway passes the historic Roberts Inn and intersects MD 97 (Roxbury Mills Road). A park and ride lot is located at the northeast corner of this intersection. MD 144 continues east to West Friendship, where the highway crosses the Middle Patuxent River and Terrapin Branch, passes the Howard County Fairgrounds, and intersects MD 32 (Sykesville Road). The state highway leaves the farmland behind and passes through a mixture of forest and residential subdivisions, passing Marriottsville Road and Folly Quarter Road. On the western edge of Ellicott City, MD 144 reaches its eastern terminus at US 40 (Baltimore National Pike).

=== Ellicott City – Baltimore ===
Maryland Route 144
- Location: Ellicott City – Baltimore
- Length: 8.62 mi (13.87 km)
- Tourist routes: Historic National Road

Frederick Road splits off from US 40 as a county highway about 1 mile (1.6 km) east of the eastern end of the Mount Airy – Ellicott City portion of MD 144. This county highway parallels US 40 to the south as it passes through residential subdivisions, crossing the Little Patuxent River, intersecting Centennial Lane and St. John's Lane, and passing the historic home MacAlpine. Frederick Road passes under US 29 (Columbia Pike) before intersecting Toll House Road. The county highway intersects Rogers Avenue and descends into downtown Ellicott City as Main Street. Within the Ellicott City Historic District and nearby are the Howard County offices and the Howard County Circuit Courthouse, the remains of the Patapsco Female Institute, and the Ellicott City Station, which preserves the oldest remaining passenger train station in the U.S. as a railroad museum. The highway passes under the Oliver Viaduct, which carries CSX's Old Main Line Subdivision railroad line, before crossing the Patapsco River into Baltimore County.

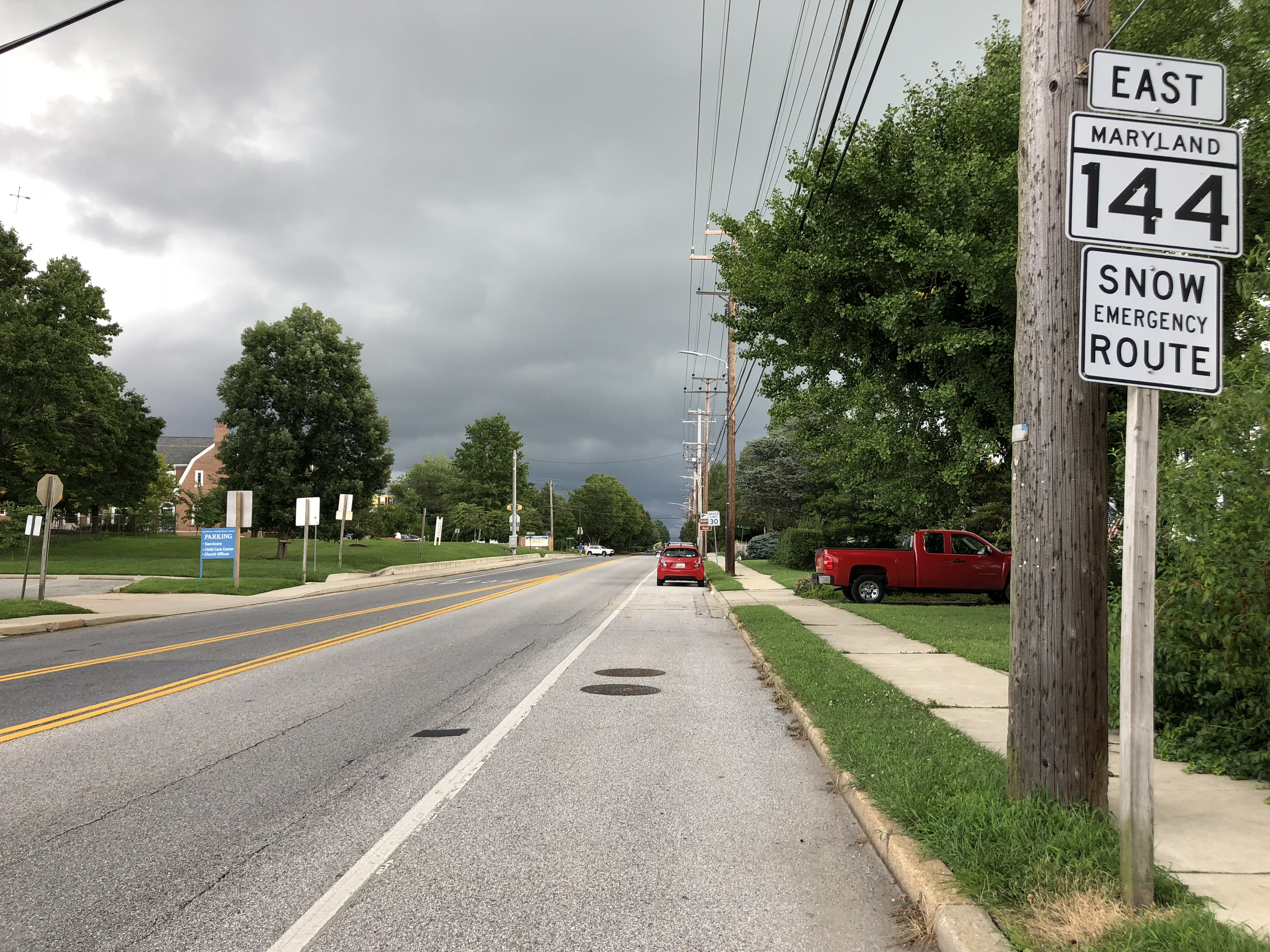
View east along MD 144 at MD 166 in Catonsville

MD 144 begins at the county line as two-lane undivided Frederick Road, where the state highway passes through the Ellicott's Mills Historic District. The state highway parallels the Patapsco River east to River Road, where the highway gains an eastbound climbing lane and leaves the steep river valley. MD 144 passes several loops of old alignment on the ascent, which concludes shortly after passing Old Frederick Road. MD 144 continues east through a densely populated residential area, intersecting North Rolling Road and entering Catonsville, where the highway intersects MD 166 (South Rolling Road), which heads south toward the University of Maryland Baltimore County and Baltimore/Washington International Thurgood Marshall Airport (via I-195). The state highway passes close to the historic home Summit and passes between the Old Catonsville Historic District and Central Catonsville and Summit Park Historic District as it enters downtown Catonsville, which contains Old Catonsville High School. At the eastern end of the central business district, MD 144 passes Wade Avenue, which heads south to Spring Grove Hospital Center, before meeting I-695 (Baltimore Beltway) at a diamond interchange.

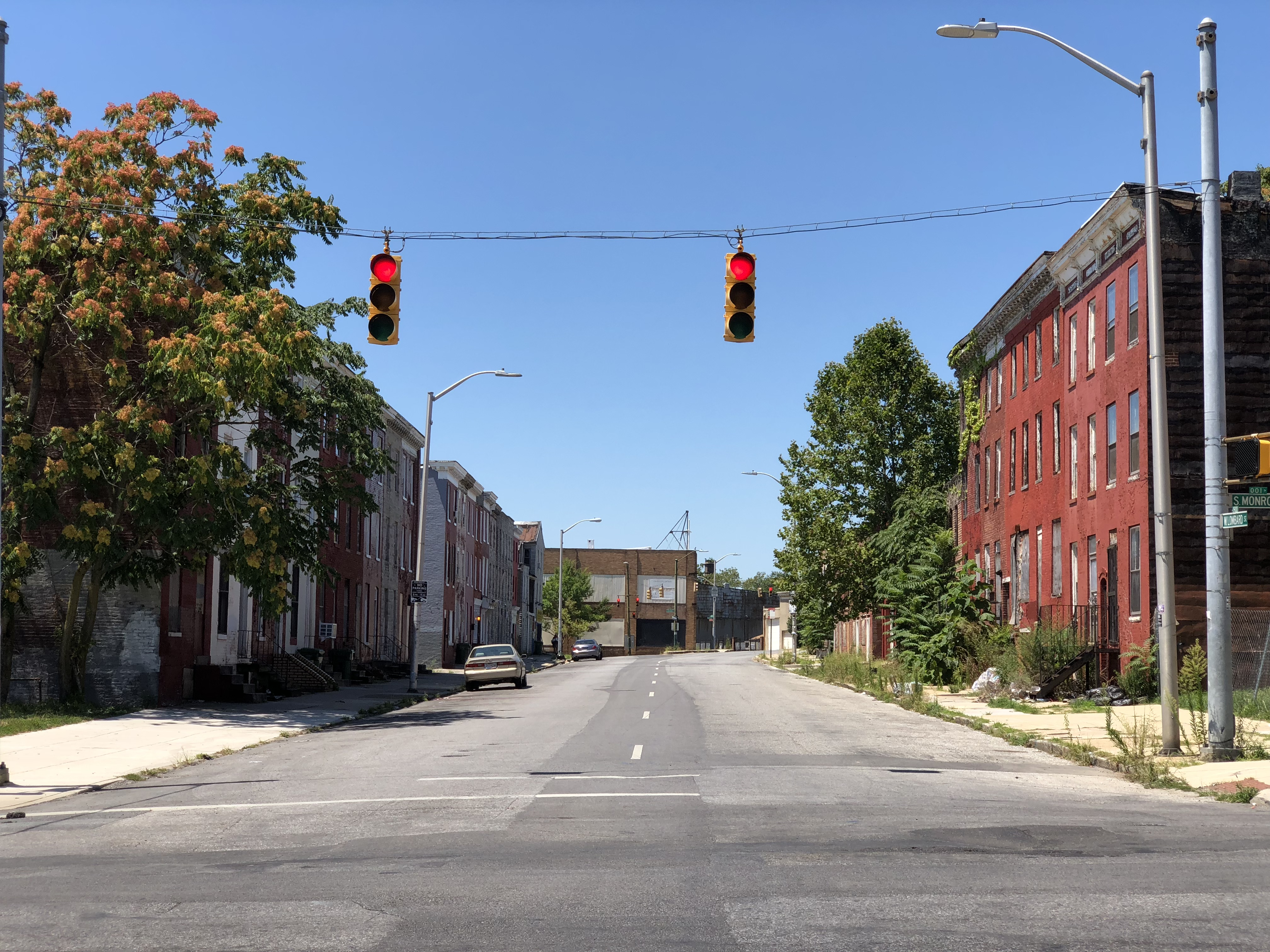
View west along Lombard Street (MD 144) at Monroe Street (US 1) in Baltimore

Shortly after the interchange with I-695, MD 144 enters the city of Baltimore, where it continues as Frederick Avenue. The state highway passes Baltimore National Cemetery, Mount Saint Joseph College high school, the Schwartze Mansion, and Loudon Park National Cemetery in a residential area. MD 144 expands to a four-lane undivided highway at Beechfield Avenue before reaching Hilton Street and Caton Avenue, where the highway crosses over Amtrak's Northeast Corridor railroad line. The state highway continues east through a less affluent series of neighborhoods where it crosses over Gwynns Falls and CSX's Hanover Subdivision railroad line. East of Bentalou Street, MD 144 splits into a one-way pair, with the eastbound lanes following Pratt Street and the westbound lanes following Frederick Avenue and then Lombard Street. The state highway intersects US 1 at its own one-way pair, Monroe Street southbound and Fulton Avenue northbound. Both directions of MD 144 have their eastern terminus at Fulton Avenue, although Frederick Avenue itself continues two more blocks to its own terminus at Baltimore and Gilmor Streets. Both Pratt Street and Lombard Street continue east toward downtown Baltimore, passing through the Union Square neighborhood and by the Mount Clare Shops and the B&O Railroad Museum.

== History ==
The section of MD 144FB within New Market was transferred to the town in an agreement dated December 14, 2011. In 2014, the group Preservation Howard County placed the road on its top 10 most endangered list, followed by Preservation Maryland in 2015. In 2015, a roundabout was constructed at the eastern terminus of the Hagerstown section of MD 144 at MD 910C.

=== MD 144WB ===
MD 144 follows what was constructed as the Baltimore and Cumberland Turnpike through Hancock in the 19th century. This highway was reconstructed as one of the original state roads by the Maryland State Roads Commission. The highway was paved from Little Tonoloway Creek to the western edge of Hancock in 1913, and from there east through the town to east of Tonoloway Creek in 1915. The highway through Hancock followed the same alignment as modern MD 144 except for a circuitous alignment on both sides of Tonoloway Creek that followed what is now Old Route 40, Tollgate Ridge Road, and Ford Drive. The present bridge and alignment were constructed in 1940. Construction on I-70 from the Pennsylvania state line to east of Tonoloway Creek began in 1963. By 1964, a US 40 bypass of Hancock, following what is now I-68 from Exit 77 to I-70, was under construction. I-70 and the US 40 bypass were completed in 1966. MD 144 was marked along the old alignment of US 40 through Hancock by 1967.

== Junction lists ==
=== MD 144 Allegany ===
The entire route is in Allegany County.

Location	mi	km	Destinations	Notes
Cumberland	0.00	0.00	MD 807 (Bedford Road)	Western terminus; MD 807 is unsigned
Cumberland	0.46	0.74	I-68 west / US 40 west / US 220 south (National Freeway) – Cumberland	I-68 Exit 46 (westbound)
Cumberland	0.57	0.92	Naves Cross Road east	MD 144 turns south onto Christie Road; Naves Cross Road is unsigned MD 807A
Cumberland	0.69	1.11	Christie Road south	MD 144 turns east onto Ali Ghan Road
Cumberland	1.26	2.03	US 220 north – Bedford	
Cumberland	1.42	2.29	I-68 west / US 40 west (National Freeway) / US 220 south – Hancock, Cumberland	I-68 Exit 47 (westbound)
	4.30	6.92	Rocky Gap Road north	Unsigned MD 948AE
	5.59	9.00	Pleasant Valley Road north – Rocky Gap State Park	Unsigned MD 948AD
	6.97	11.22	Sunset Orchard Road north to I-68 west / US 40 west	Unsigned MD 948C
	9.14	14.71	West Wilson Road west	Unsigned MD 948M
Flintstone	10.77	17.33	I-68 east / US 40 east (National Freeway) – Hancock	I-68 Exit 56
Flintstone	10.97	17.65	Black Valley Road north to I-68 west / US 40 west – Cumberland	Unsigned MD 948AO
	11.56	18.60	Town Creek Road south – Green Ridge State Forest	
	13.72	22.08	Gilpin Road west	Unsigned MD 144AE
	17.55	28.24	US 40 Scenic (National Pike) to I-68 / US 40	Eastern terminus
1.000 mi = 1.609 km; 1.000 km = 0.621 mi: Incomplete access

=== MD 144WB ===
The entire route is in Washington County.

Location	mi	km	Destinations	Notes
Woodmont	0.00	0.00	I-68 / US 40 (National Freeway) – Cumberland, Hancock	Western terminus; I-68 Exit 77
Woodmont	0.12	0.19	US 40 Scenic west (National Pike)	US 40 Scenic is county-maintained but signed
Woodmont	0.25	0.40	Woodmont Road south	Former MD 453
Hancock	3.52	5.66	US 522 south – Berkeley Springs, WV	Ramp is unsigned US 522B
Hancock	3.67	5.91	Limestone Road north	Unsigned MD 894; old alignment of US 522
Hancock	3.75	6.04	Virginia Avenue to US 522 north / I-68 / I-70	Unsigned US 522C
Hancock	5.91	9.51	I-70 east / US 40 east (Eisenhower Memorial Highway) – Hagerstown, Frederick	Eastern terminus; I-70 Exit 3; no direct access from MD 144 to I-70 west; use Exit 5 to access I-70 and I-68 west
1.000 mi = 1.609 km; 1.000 km = 0.621 mi: Incomplete access

=== MD 144WA ===
The entire route is in Washington County.

Location	mi	km	Destinations	Notes
Huyett	0.00	0.00	US 40 (National Pike) – Clear Spring	Western terminus
Hagerstown	1.47	2.37	Western Maryland Parkway to US 40 / I-81 / Washington Street east	Roundabout; eastern terminus; Western Maryland Parkway north is MD 910C
1.000 mi = 1.609 km; 1.000 km = 0.621 mi

=== MD 144FA ===
The entire route is in Frederick County.

Location	mi	km	Destinations	Notes
Frederick	0.00	0.00	Patrick Street west to US 40 / Jefferson Street	Western terminus; Patrick Street is one-way westbound; Jefferson Street is former US 340
Frederick	0.56	0.90	Market Street	Former MD 355
Frederick	0.86	1.38	East Street	Patrick Street becomes two-way
Frederick	1.91	3.07	Monocacy Boulevard to I-70 west / US 40 west	
Frederick	1.91	3.07	To Bowmans Farm Road	Unsigned MD 870G
Frederick	2.23	3.59	I-70 east / US 40 east (Baltimore National Pike) – Baltimore	I-70 Exit 56; no direct access from MD 144 to I-70 west
Bartonsville	5.45	8.77	Old National Pike east – New Market	
Bartonsville	5.57	8.96	I-70 / US 40 (Baltimore National Pike) / Ijamsville Road south – Frederick, Baltimore	Eastern terminus; I-70 Exit 59
1.000 mi = 1.609 km; 1.000 km = 0.621 mi: Incomplete access

=== MD 144FB ===
The entire route is in New Market, Frederick County.

mi	km	Destinations	Notes
0.00	0.00	Main Street west – New Market	Western terminus; New Market town limit
0.31	0.50	MD 75 (Green Valley Road) to I-70 / US 40 – Libertytown, Hyattstown Old National Pike east – Mount Airy	Eastern terminus
1.000 mi = 1.609 km; 1.000 km = 0.621 mi

=== MD 144A ===
County	Location	mi	km	Destinations	Notes
Frederick	Mount Airy	0.00	0.00	MD 27 (Ridge Road) to I-70 / US 40 – Damascus, Westminster	Western terminus
Carroll	No major junctions				
Howard		2.44	3.93	Long Corner Road south / Twin Arch Road north	Twin Arch Road is unsigned MD 144HC
Howard		4.44	7.15	Watersville Road north	Former MD 532
Howard	Lisbon	5.74	9.24	MD 94 (Woodbine Road) – Woodbine, Florence	Roundabout
Howard		6.52	10.49	Daisy Road south	Former MD 96
Howard		7.10	11.43	Morgan Station Road south	Former MD 476
Howard	Cooksville	8.88	14.29	MD 97 (Roxbury Mills Road) – Olney, Westminster	
Howard	West Friendship	12.69	20.42	MD 32 (Sykesville Road) – Sykesville, Clarksville	
Howard		15.52	24.98	Marriottsville Road north to I-70 / US 40 – Marriottsville	
Howard		16.05	25.83	Folly Quarter Road south	Former MD 98
Howard	Ellicott City	17.20	27.68	US 40 (Baltimore National Pike) – Catonsville, Frederick	Eastern terminus
1.000 mi = 1.609 km; 1.000 km = 0.621 mi

=== MD 144 Baltimore ===
County	Location	mi	km	Destinations	Notes
Howard	Ellicott City	0.00	0.00	Main Street west – Ellicott City Historic District	Western terminus; Howard–Baltimore county line at Patapsco River
Baltimore	Catonsville	2.85	4.59	MD 166 south (Rolling Road) to I-195 – University of Maryland Baltimore County, BWI Airport	
Baltimore	Catonsville	4.07	6.55	I-695 (Baltimore Beltway) – Glen Burnie, Towson	I-695 Exit 13
Baltimore City		7.01	11.28	Hilton Street north / Caton Avenue south	
Baltimore City		7.69	12.38	Pratt Street east	MD 144 splits into one way pair following Pratt Street (eastbound) and Lombard Street/Frederick Avenue (westbound)
Baltimore City		8.52	13.71	US 1 north (Monroe Street)	
Baltimore City		8.62	13.87	US 1 south (Fulton Avenue) / Pratt Street east – Baltimore Inner Harbor	Eastern terminus
1.000 mi = 1.609 km; 1.000 km = 0.621 mi

== Auxiliary routes ==
MD 144 has four auxiliary routes, two in Allegany County and two in Howard County.

- MD 144AE is the unsigned designation for Gilpin Road, a 2.53-mile (4.07 km) section of original alignment of US 40 that runs from Town Creek Road east to MD 144 east of Flintstone.
- MD 144AL is the unsigned designation for an unnamed 0.08-mile (0.13 km) spur south from US 40 Scenic near Town Hill.
- MD 144HB is the designation for Twin Arch Road, a 0.12-mile (0.19 km) service road that runs from the Patapsco River east to an intersection with county-maintained Twin Arch Road between I-70 to the south and the namesake double-arch bridge that carries CSX's Old Main Line Subdivision.
- MD 144HC is the designation for Twin Arch Road, a 0.04-mile (0.064 km) service road that runs from the intersection of MD 144A and Long Corner Road north to a dead end.

== See also ==
- Maryland Route 7, a similar route for many sections of the old alignments of US 40 between Baltimore and Elkton.
