= Grace United Methodist Church (Wilmington, Delaware) =

Historic church in Delaware, United States

- U.S. National Register of Historic Places
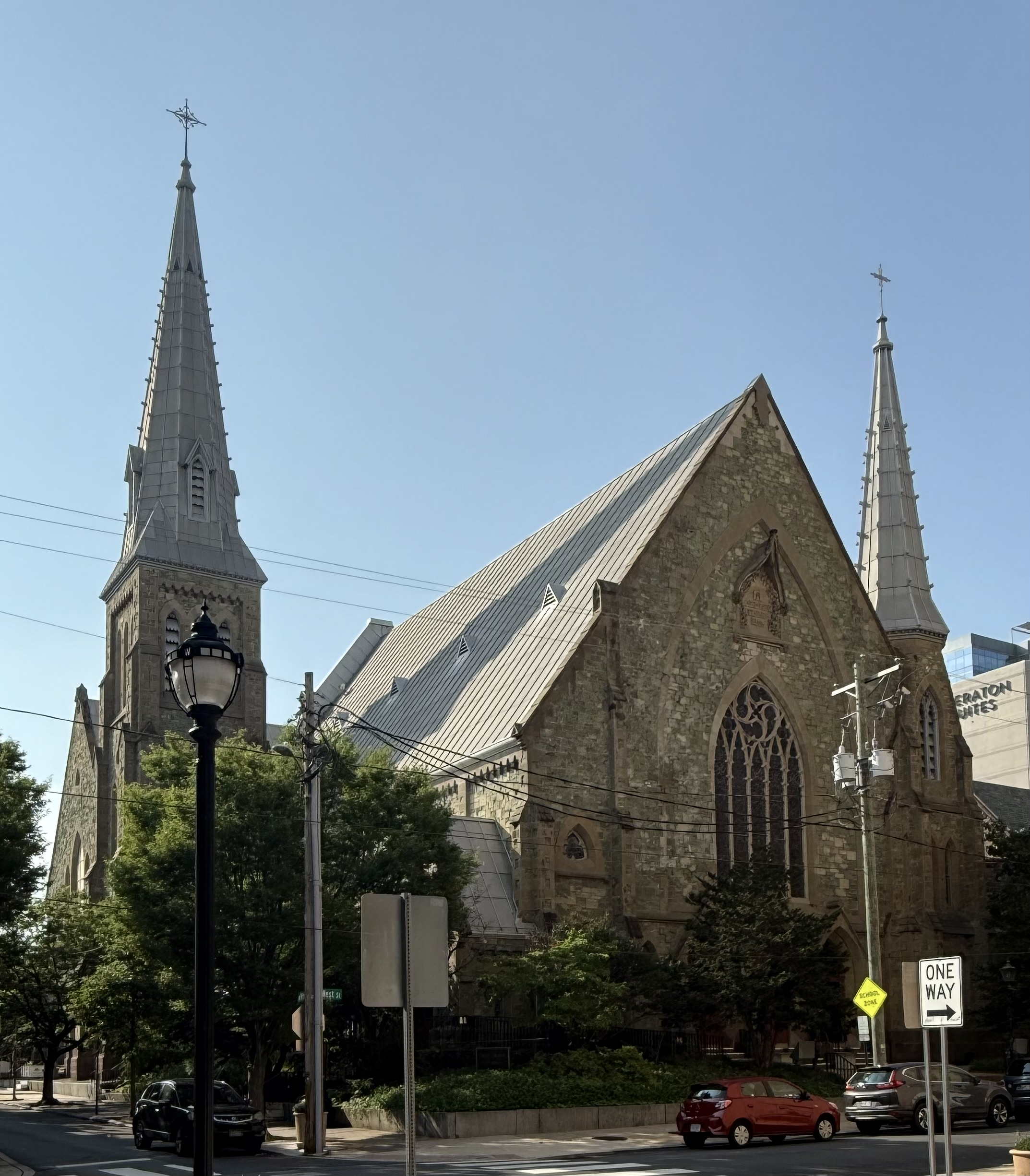
- Grace United Methodist Church in 2025

- Location within Delaware Location within the United States
- Location: 9th and West Sts. Wilmington, Delaware
- Coordinates: 39.746366°N 75.551594°W
- Area: 0.5 acres (0.20 ha)
- Built: 1868
- Architect: Dixon, Thomas, Esq.
- Architectural style: Gothic
- NRHP reference No.: 83001393
- Added to NRHP: November 12, 1983

Grace United Methodist Church is a historic Methodist church located at 9th and West Streets in Wilmington, New Castle County, Delaware. It was designed by architect Thomas Dixon and built in 1868. It is constructed of serpentine stone of a light pea green color in the Victorian Gothic style. The church building measures approximately 166 feet by 102 feet, 6 inches. It features a needle spire that rises to 186 feet and is topped by a Celtic cross.

It was added to the National Register of Historic Places in 1983. It was dedicated in 1868 to the Union victory at Gettysburg, which saved the city from being ransacked by the advancing Confederates.
