= Centenary Methodist Episcopal Church, South =

Historic church in Missouri, United States

- U.S. National Register of Historic Places
- St. Louis Landmark
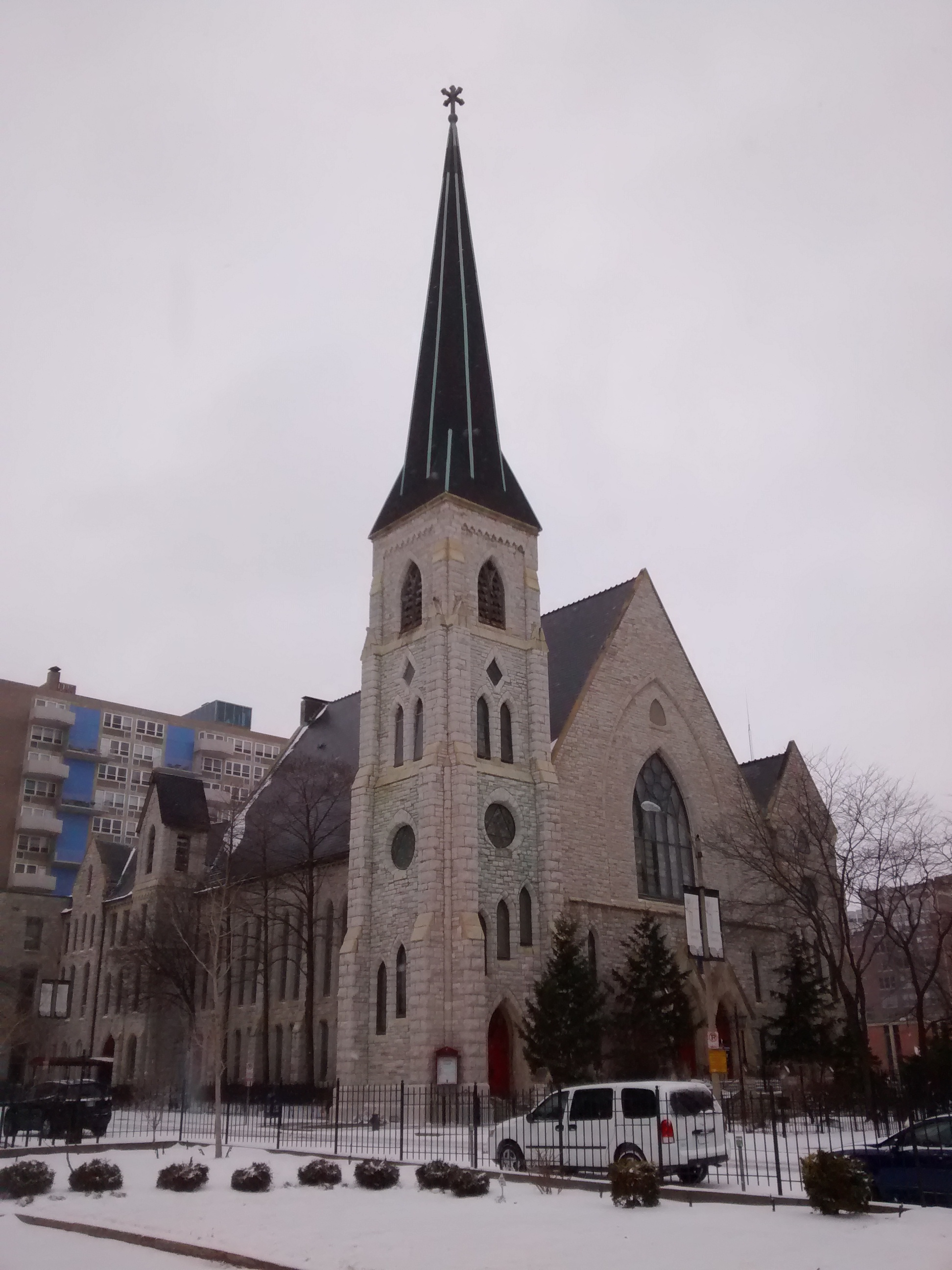

- Location within St. Louis Location within Missouri Location within the United States
- Location: 55 Plaza Sq., St. Louis, Missouri
- Coordinates: 38°37′48″N 90°12′12″W
- Area: less than one acre
- Built: 1869, 1924
- Architect: Dixon, Thomas; Legg, Jerome B.; Mauran, Russell & Crowell
- Architectural style: Late Gothic Revival
- NRHP reference No.: 96001596
- Added to NRHP: January 16, 1997

The Centenary Methodist Episcopal Church, South in St. Louis, Missouri is a Gothic Revival church that was built in 1869. It was listed on the National Register of Historic Places in 1997.

The building is a two-story limestone church linked with a three-story office/service building. It was designed by Baltimore architect Thomas Dixon and its construction was supervised by local architect Jerome B. Legg. A three-story brick and stone addition to the west was added in 1924, designed by St. Louis architects Mauran, Russell & Crowell.
