= St. Mary's Episcopal Church (Woodlawn, Maryland) =

Historic church in Maryland, United States

- U.S. National Register of Historic Places
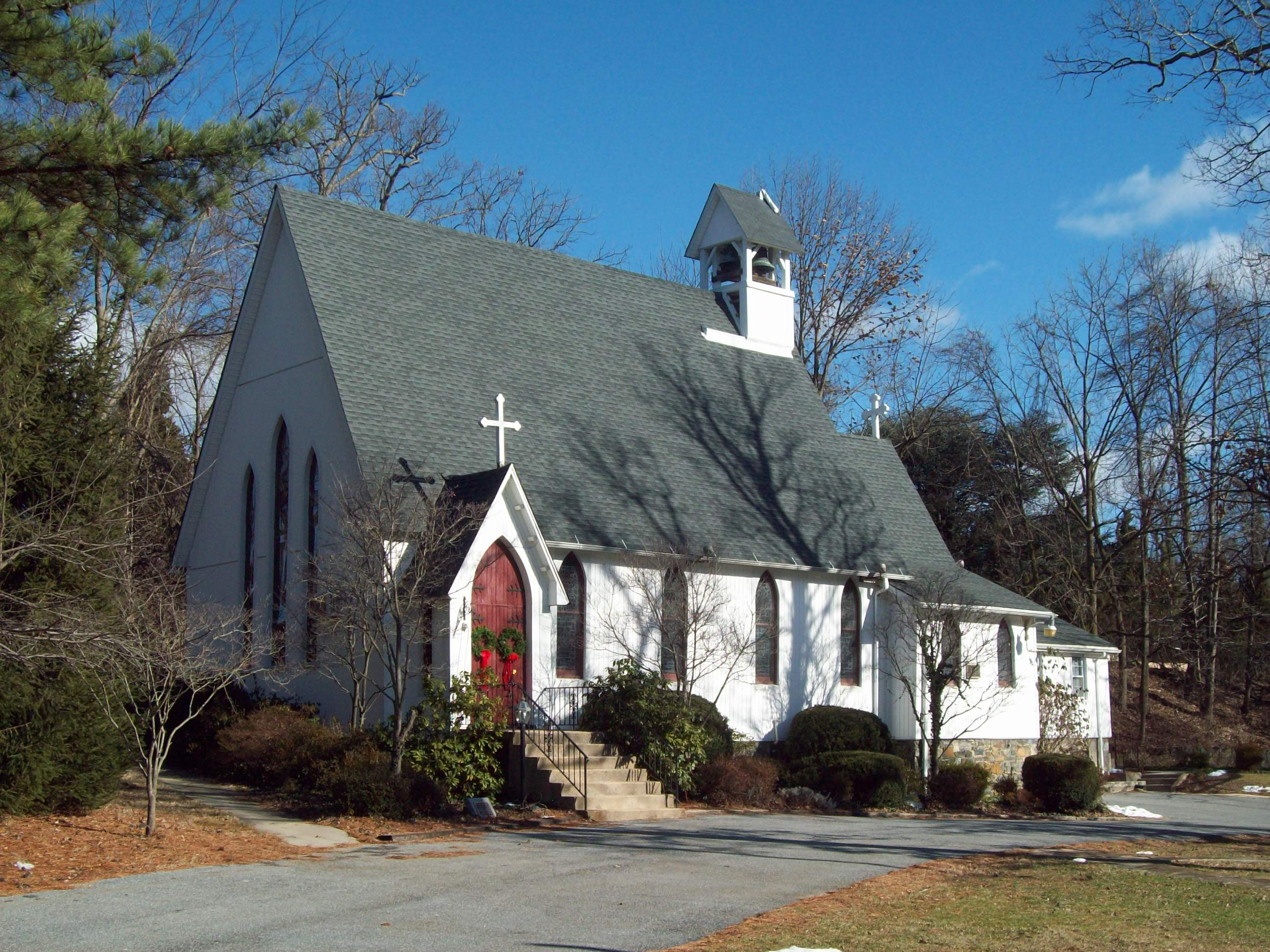
- St. Mary's Episcopal Church, Woodlawn MD, December 2009

- Location within Maryland Location within the United States
- Location: 5610 Dogwood Road, Woodlawn, Maryland
- Coordinates: 39°18′47″N 76°43′16″W
- Area: 0.7 acres (0.28 ha)
- Built: 1873
- Architect: Dixon & Carson
- Architectural style: Gothic
- NRHP reference No.: 85000583
- Added to NRHP: March 14, 1985

St. Mary's Episcopal Church, also known as the Church of St. Mary the Virgin, is an historic rectangular-shaped Carpenter Gothic style Episcopal church located at 5610 Dogwood Road in Woodlawn, Baltimore County, Maryland. Designed by the Baltimore architectural firm of Dixon and Carson, it was built in 1873. Its steeply pitched gable roof, board and batten siding, lancet windows and arched side entry way are all typical features of Carpenter Gothic churches.

It was listed on the National Register of Historic Places in 1985.
