= Maryland Route 122 =

State highway in Baltimore County, Maryland, known as Security Blvd and Cooks Ln

Maryland Route 122
- Security Boulevard
- Maryland Route 122 highlighted in red

Route information
- Maintained by MDSHA
- Length: 2.96 mi (4.76 km)
- Existed: 1991–present

Major junctions
- West end: Rolling Road in Woodlawn
- I-695 in Woodlawn
- East end: MD 570 / Cooks Lane at the Woodlawn–Baltimore line

Location
- Country: United States
- State: Maryland
- Counties: Baltimore, City of Baltimore

Highway system
- Maryland highway system; Interstate; US; State; Scenic Byways
← MD 121	→ MD 124

Maryland Route 122 (MD 122) is a state highway in the U.S. state of Maryland. Known as Security Boulevard, the state highway runs 2.96 miles (4.76 km) from Rolling Road east to the Baltimore city line within the western Baltimore County suburb of Woodlawn. MD 122 serves the headquarters of the Social Security Administration and connects the agency with MD 570, I-695, and U.S. Route 40 (US 40). Security Boulevard was constructed in 1960 concurrent with the completion of the Social Security Administration's new headquarters. The highway was transferred from county to state maintenance around 1991.

== Route description ==
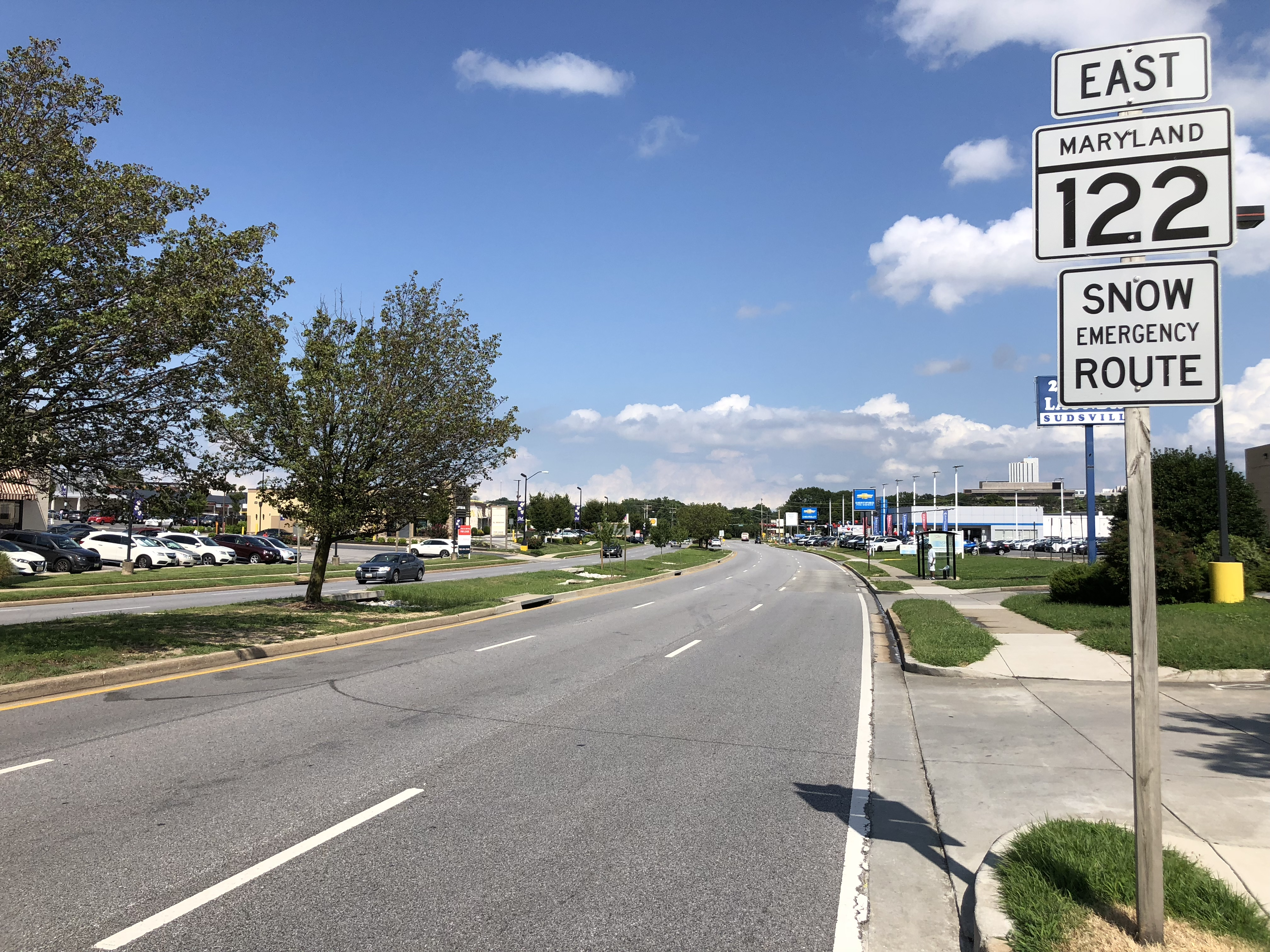
View east along MD 122 past I-695 in Woodlawn

MD 122 begins at an intersection with Rolling Road. The roadway continues west as the county-maintained portion of Security Boulevard, a four-lane divided highway that leads to the headquarters of the Centers for Medicare & Medicaid Services. MD 122 heads east as a six-lane divided highway through a commercial area. The state highway intersects Belmont Avenue just north of Security Square Mall before its partial cloverleaf interchange with I-695 (Baltimore Beltway) just north of the Beltway's stack interchange with I-70 and MD 570. There is no access between MD 122 and I-70/MD 570 via I-695. East of the Beltway, the state highway intersects Woodlawn Drive and Gwynn Oak Avenue and passes along the northern edge of the Social Security Administration headquarters complex. East of the complex, MD 122 parallels Dead Run east and then southeast through a forested area, becoming four lanes at its intersection with Forest Park Avenue and Ingleside Avenue, the latter of which has a ramp to westbound MD 570 (which replaced I-70 east of I-695 in 2014). The state highway continues through a partial cloverleaf interchange with MD 570 just west of the freeway's eastern terminus at a park and ride facility. At the boundary between Baltimore County and the city of Baltimore, the highway continues as a residential street known as Cooks Lane through the West Hills neighborhood of Baltimore to US 40 (Edmondson Avenue).

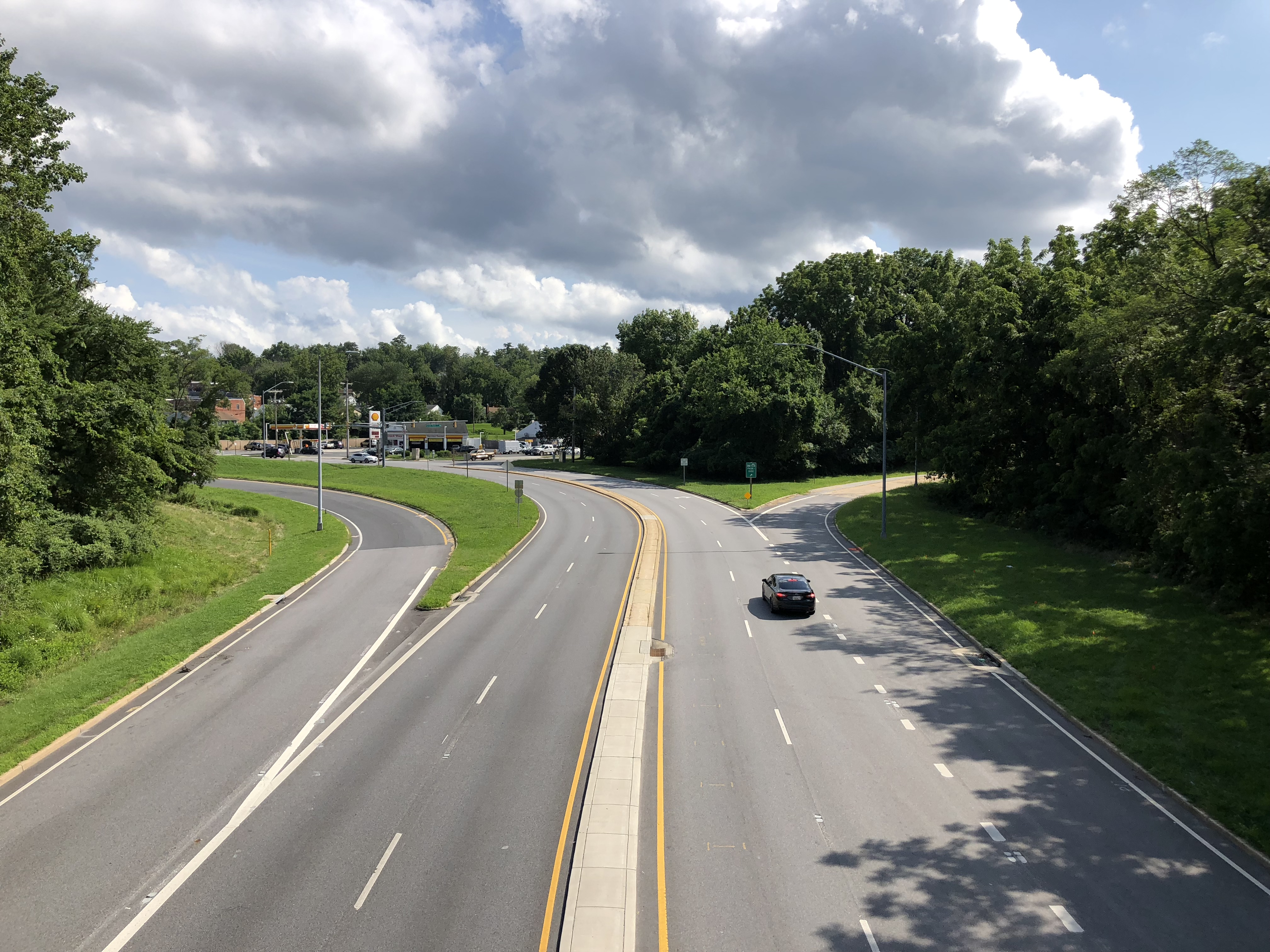
MD 122 eastbound at MD 570, just before its terminus at the Baltimore city line

== History ==
Security Boulevard was constructed by Baltimore County specifically as an access road to the new Social Security Administration headquarters complex constructed in Woodlawn that opened in 1960. The new divided highway was built from the intersection of Forest Park Avenue and Cooks Lane north and west to a point west of Gwynn Oak Avenue in 1960. The boulevard was extended west to Belmont Avenue in 1963 contemporaneous with the completion of I-695 through Woodlawn. Security Boulevard was extended beyond Rolling Road to its present western terminus in 1972. The boulevard east of Rolling Road and the short adjacent portion of Cooks Lane in Baltimore County were transferred from county to state maintenance and designated MD 122 around 1991.

== Junction list ==
County	Location	mi	km	Destinations	Notes
Baltimore	Woodlawn	0.00	0.00	Rolling Road	Western terminus
Baltimore	Woodlawn	0.58	0.93	I-695 (Baltimore Beltway) – Glen Burnie, Towson	Exit 17 on I-695
Baltimore County–Baltimore City line	Woodlawn–Baltimore line	2.79	4.49	MD 570 west – Park and Ride	Exit 94 on MD 570
Baltimore County–Baltimore City line	Woodlawn–Baltimore line	2.96	4.76	Cooks Lane to US 40	Continuation east
1.000 mi = 1.609 km; 1.000 km = 0.621 mi
