= Maryland Route 372 =

State highway in Maryland, United States

Maryland Route 372
- Wilkens Avenue
- Maryland Route 372 highlighted in red

Route information
- Maintained by MDSHA and Baltimore DOT
- Length: 2.86 mi (4.60 km)
- Existed: 1927–present

Major junctions
- West end: MD 166 in Catonsville
- I-695 in Catonsville
- East end: US 1 in Baltimore

Location
- Country: United States
- State: Maryland
- Counties: Baltimore, Baltimore City

Highway system
- Maryland highway system; Interstate; US; State; Scenic Byways
← MD 371	→ MD 373

Maryland Route 372 (MD 372) is a state highway in the U.S. state of Maryland. Known as Wilkens Avenue, the state highway runs 2.86 miles (4.60 km) from MD 166 in Catonsville east to U.S. Route 1 (US 1) in Baltimore. MD 372 connects Baltimore and Interstate 695 (I-695) with the University of Maryland, Baltimore County (UMBC), and Spring Grove Hospital Center. Wilkens Avenue begins westward from South Gilmor Street and was constructed from Monroe Street in Baltimore to Rolling Road in the last quarter of the 19th century.

Almost the entire length of the highway was improved in the 1930s for local and long-distance traffic. MD 372's eastern terminus was moved west twice: first in the late 1930s when US 1 was moved to the avenue east of Caton Avenue, and again in the late 1940s when US 1 was moved to its present course.

== Route description ==
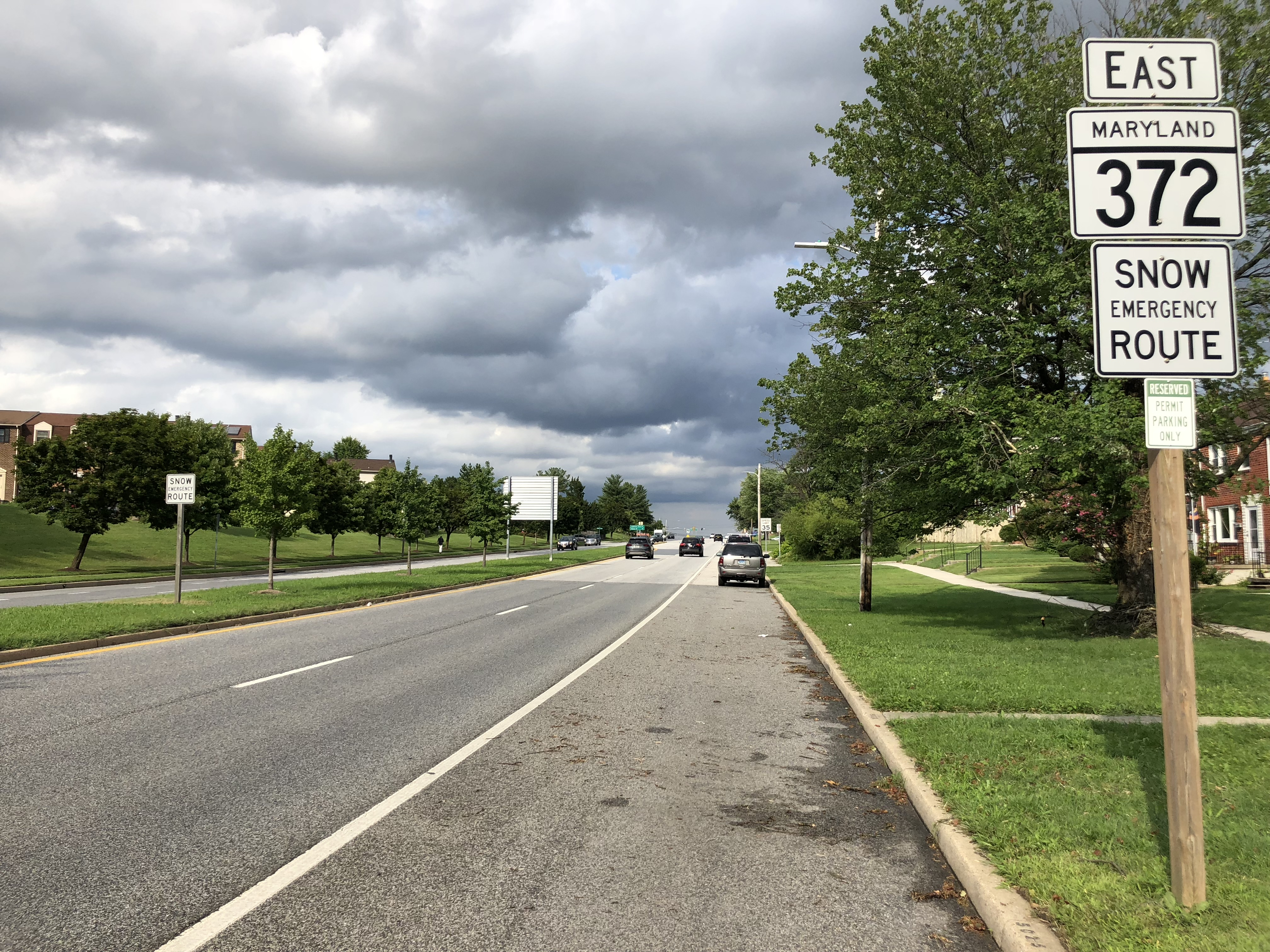
View east along MD 372 at I-695 in Catonsville

MD 372 begins at an intersection with MD 166 (Rolling Road) in Catonsville. The state highway heads northeast as two-lane undivided Wilkens Avenue. The route runs along the edge of Rolling Road Golf Course to the UMBC Roundabout, where the highway intersects Hilltop Road, which is one of the entrances to the UMBC campus. After the roundabout, MD 372 expands to a four-lane divided highway and follows the edge of the UMBC campus.

The state highway curves to the east after passing Valley Road, which provides access to Spring Grove Hospital Center, and meets I-695 (Baltimore Beltway) at a partial cloverleaf interchange. East of the Beltway, MD 372 intersects Maiden Choice Lane, where the highway reduces to a two-lane undivided highway, and Beechfield Avenue before entering the city of Baltimore. The state highway runs alongside Loudon Park National Cemetery as a four-lane undivided street before meeting its eastern terminus at US 1, which continues toward downtown Baltimore as Wilkens Avenue and heads south as Southwestern Boulevard. There is no access from northbound US 1 to westbound MD 372.

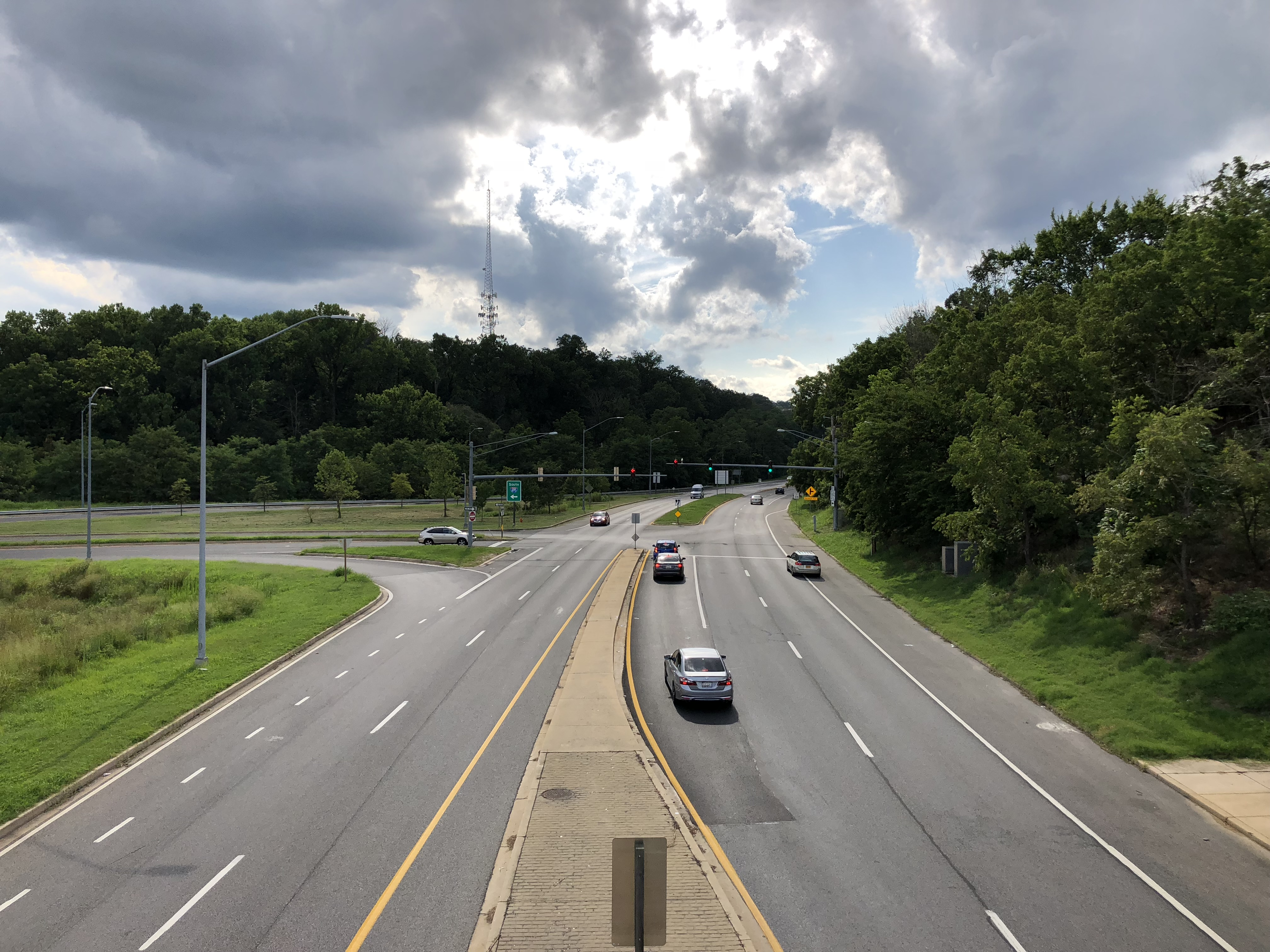
View west along MD 372 at I-695 in Catonsville

== History ==
Wilkens Avenue was named for William Wilkens, an industrialist who owned a hair factory and donated land for the city of Baltimore to construct his namesake avenue. The avenue was originally constructed from Gilmor Street southwest to the Baltimore city limits near Gwynns Falls in 1876. Wilkens Avenue was extended southwest into Baltimore County to Rolling Road by 1887. Extending Wilkens Avenue across the Patapsco River to Howard County via a bridge near a site called Orange Grove was proposed in the early 1890s but this never came to fruition. The Maryland Geological Survey granted Baltimore County state aid to pave in macadam its portion of Wilkens Avenue, starting from the contemporary city limit at Desoto Road, around 1907. Two attempts to rename the avenue were met with disdain: H.L. Mencken panned a 1932 attempt to rename the street as Sunset Boulevard and community opposition derailed a 1941 attempt to rename the avenue Crozier Boulevard in memory of recently deceased city engineer Bernard "Bunny" Crozier.

By the 1930s, there were plans to improve the city and county portions of Wilkens Avenue to better handle commuter and long-distance traffic. In 1934, the Maryland State Roads Commission marked MD 372 for expansion from a width of 12 to 14 feet (3.7 to 4.3 m) to 20 feet (6.1 m) for its entire length in Baltimore County. The highway was widened to 30 feet (9.1 m) from the city limits to the entrance to Spring Grove State Hospital in 1938. Between 1930 and 1933, the avenue was widened and resurfaced in concrete from the city–county line to Desoto Road in the city. East of there, new bridges were completed for the avenue over the Pennsylvania Railroad, Gwynns Falls, and the Western Maryland Railway in 1936. Between 1936 and 1938, Wilkens Avenue was widened to a 60-foot (18 m) undivided street from Caton Avenue to Gwynns Falls and to a four-lane divided boulevard from Gwynns Falls east to Monroe Street. US 1, which originally followed Washington Boulevard to Monroe Street, was placed on Wilkens Avenue from Monroe Street to Caton Avenue, which was also widened, in 1939.

Starting in 1947, the Wilkens Avenue Extended project was constructed from Arbutus to the Pennsylvania Railroad (now Amtrak) bridge on Wilkens Avenue. When this four-lane divided highway, which is now named Southwestern Boulevard, was completed in 1949, US 1 was moved to its present alignment and the eastern terminus of MD 372 was rolled back from Caton Avenue to its present eastern terminus. MD 372 was expanded to a four-lane divided highway from its interchange with I-695 to east of Maiden Choice Lane in 1957 and from the Beltway to west of Valley Road in 1960. The roundabout at the junction of MD 372 and Hilltop Road was installed in 1998.

== Junction list ==
County	Location	mi	km	Destinations	Notes
Baltimore	Catonsville	0.00	0.00	MD 166 (Rolling Road) – Arbutus, UMBC Tech Incubator, Catonsville	Western terminus
Baltimore	Catonsville	0.55	0.89	Hilltop Road – UMBC	UMBC Roundabout
Baltimore	Catonsville	1.41	2.27	I-695 (Baltimore Beltway) – Glen Burnie, Towson	I-695 Exit 12
Baltimore City		2.86	4.60	US 1 (Wilkens Avenue/Southwestern Boulevard) – Arbutus, Downtown Baltimore	Eastern terminus; no direct access from northbound US 1 to westbound MD 372
1.000 mi = 1.609 km; 1.000 km = 0.621 mi: Incomplete access
