= The Woodlands Golf Course =

Coordinates: 39°19′50″N 76°46′33″W

- Interactive map of The Woodlands Golf Course

Club information
- Location: Windsor Mill, Maryland
- Established: 1998
- Type: Public
- Owner: Baltimore County Revenue Authority
- Operator: Baltimore County Revenue Authority
- Tota holes: 18
- Website: The Woodlands
- Designed by: Lindsay Ervin
- Par: 72
- Length: 7,014 yards Longest hole is 592 yards
- Course rating: 74.4

The Woodlands Golf Course, designed by Lindsay Ervin and sister course of Greystone golf course, opened in 1998.
