= Lesley-Travers Mansion =

Historic house in Delaware, United States

- U.S. National Register of Historic Places
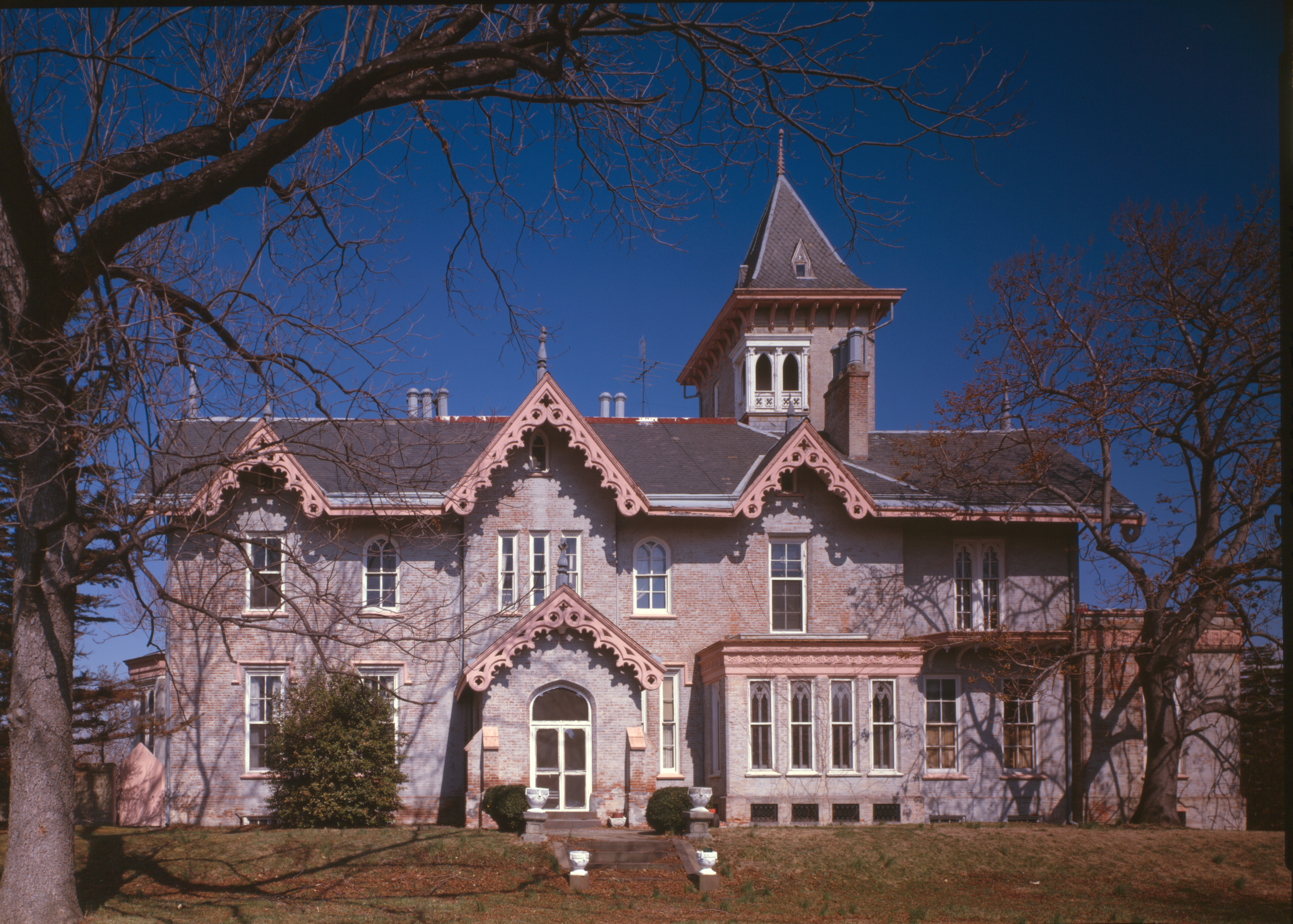
- Lesley-Travers Mansion, HABS Photo, July 1982

- Location within Delaware Location within the United States
- Location: 112 W. 6th St., New Castle, Delaware
- Coordinates: 39.66074°N 75.56970°W
- Area: 3 acres (1.2 ha)
- Built: 1855
- Built by: Van Kirk, Augustin
- Architect: Dixon, Thomas and James
- Architectural style: Gothic Revival
- NRHP reference No.: 73000523
- Added to NRHP: April 3, 1973

Lesley-Travers Mansion, also known as the Deemer House, Travers House, and Lesley House, is a historic home located at New Castle, New Castle County, Delaware. It was designed by noted Baltimore architects Thomas and James Dixon and built in 1855. It has a two-story, five-bay, brick core with several appendages and wings. It has a castle-like appearance, with a slate-covered steeply pitched gable roof and five-story tower, and is in the Gothic Revival style.

It was added to the National Register of Historic Places in 1973.
