= Mount Vernon Place United Methodist Church and Asbury House =

Historic church in Maryland, United States

- U.S. National Register of Historic Places
- U.S. National Historic Landmark District – Contributing property
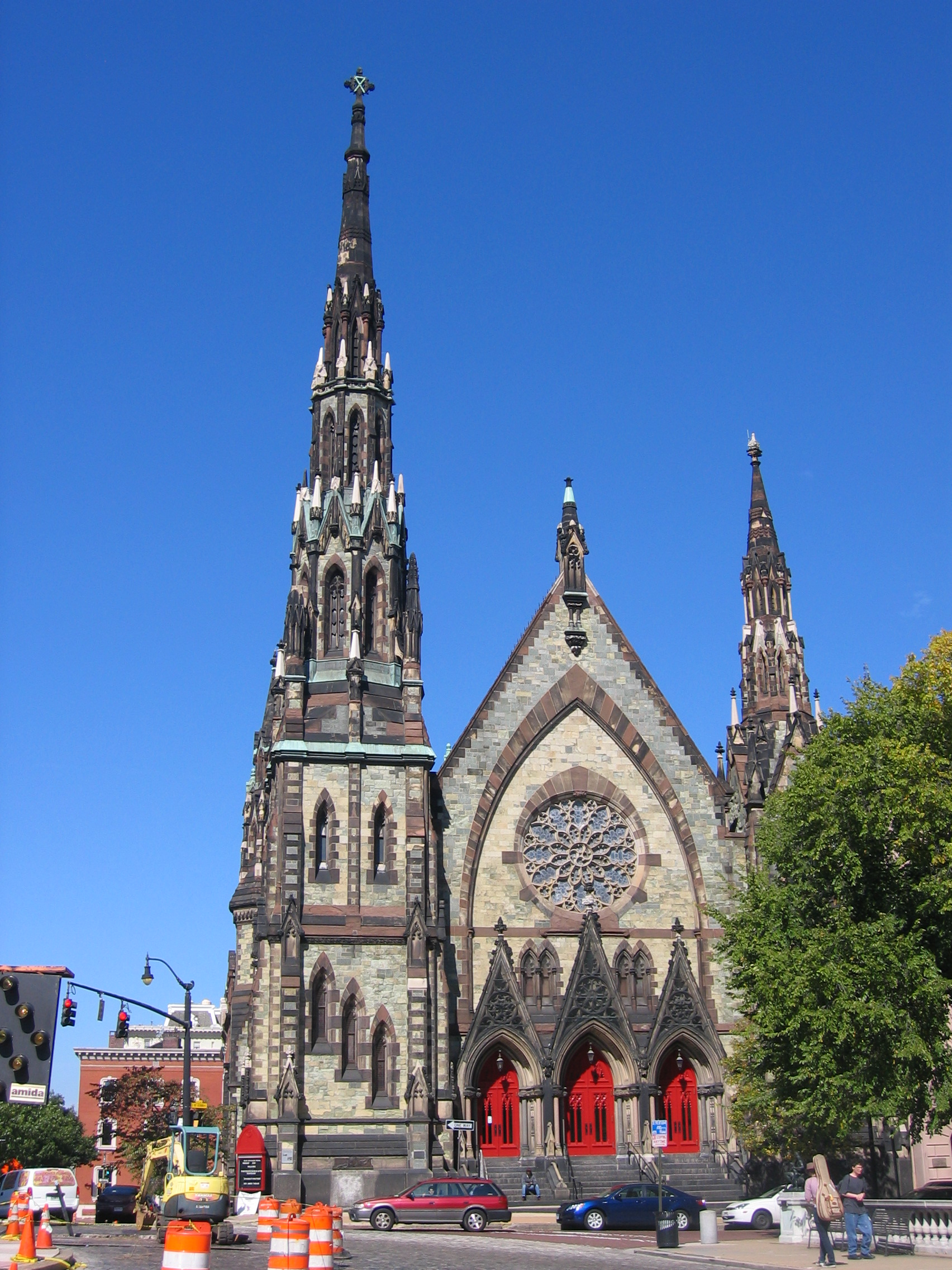
- Mount Vernon Place Methodist Church, October 2009

- Location within Baltimore Location within Maryland Location within the United States
- Location: 2-10 E. Mount Vernon Place, Baltimore, Maryland, U.S.
- Coordinates: 39°17′53″N 76°36′55″W
- Area: 0.4 acres (0.16 ha)
- Built: 1870-1872 (church); c.1850 (house)
- Architect: Thomas Dixon (church); Niernsee & Neilson (house)
- Architectural style: Gothic, Norman Gothic
- Part of: Mount Vernon Place Historic District (ID71001037)
- NRHP reference No.: 71001038

Significant dates
- Added to NRHP: September 17, 1971
- Designated NHLDCP: November 11, 1971

Mount Vernon Place United Methodist Church and Asbury House is a historic United Methodist church located at 2-10 Mount Vernon Place, Mount Vernon in Baltimore, Maryland. The church "is one of the most photographed buildings in the city, completed in 1872 near the Washington Monument on the site where Francis Scott Key died in 1843. Its sanctuary seats 900 and its rose window is modeled after the one in the Notre Dame Cathedral in Paris."

The church is a Norman-Gothic-style church that was completed in 1872. It was designed by Thomas Dixon, a Baltimore architect and is built of blocks of a unique metabasalt, a green-toned Maryland fieldstone, with brownstone ornamentation. It features three spires.

Mount Vernon Place United Methodist Church and Asbury House was listed on the National Register of Historic Places in 1971. It is a contributing building in the Mount Vernon Place Historic District, a National Historic Landmark District designated in 1971.

Baltimore architects Niernsee & Neilson designed the Asbury House, and it was built around 1850. In 1893 it became home of George von Lingen, the German consul in Baltimore. Von Lingen renovated its second floor library, which has a ceiling painting and intricate carvings done by German workers.

In 2020, Baltimore's Planning Commission approved a subdivision of the church vs. house properties.

This was sought by a developer with plans to sell the Asbury House, but with arguably vague plans for the church itself. The split was criticized, on grounds that the continuing preservation of the church proper would be threatened, with less asset value to ensure its maintenance. It was argued that the property should instead be donated to a local or national preservation-focused nonprofit which could handle the preservation requirements.

The subdivision was overturned, disallowed by Baltimore Circuit Judge Jeannie Hong, in a ruling that was the third reversal of a Planning Commission decision in 18 months.

In July 2025, a nonprofit organization called UNITE Mount Vernon acquired the church. It "envision[ed] a multifunctional site . . . an emphasis on public event space and commercial uses." Elizabeth Bonner, a local preservationist, acquired Asbury House.

Mount Vernon Place United Methodist Church should not be confused with another church of the same name in Washington, DC, which served as the national representative congregation for the Methodist Episcopal Church, South from 1850 to 1939.
