= Woodlawn-Rockdale-Milford Mills, Maryland =

Woodlawn-Rockdale-Milford Mills
- Former CDP
- Location within the state of Maryland
- Coordinates: 39°20′10″N 76°44′49″W
- Country: United States
- State: Maryland
- County: Baltimore

Population (1960)
  - Total: 19,254
- Time zone: UTC−5 (Eastern (EST))
  - Summer (DST): UTC−4 (EDT)

Woodlawn-Rockdale-Milford Mills was a Census-designated place in Baltimore County during the 1960 United States census, which consists of the communities of Milford Mill, Rockdale and Woodlawn. The population in 1960 was 19,254.

The census area's name was reorganized as "Woodlawn-Woodmoor" during the 1970 Census, when the population recorded was 28,811. Milford Mill did not return separately by census enumerators until 1980. Woodlawn did not return separately by census enumerators until 1980 under the name "Security". Rockdale became part of Milford Mill's census area.

== Geography ==
The census area of Woodlawn-Rockdale-Milford Mills was located west of Baltimore and southeast of Randallstown.
