= Old Catonsville Historic District =

Historic district in Maryland, United States

- U.S. National Register of Historic Places
- U.S. Historic district
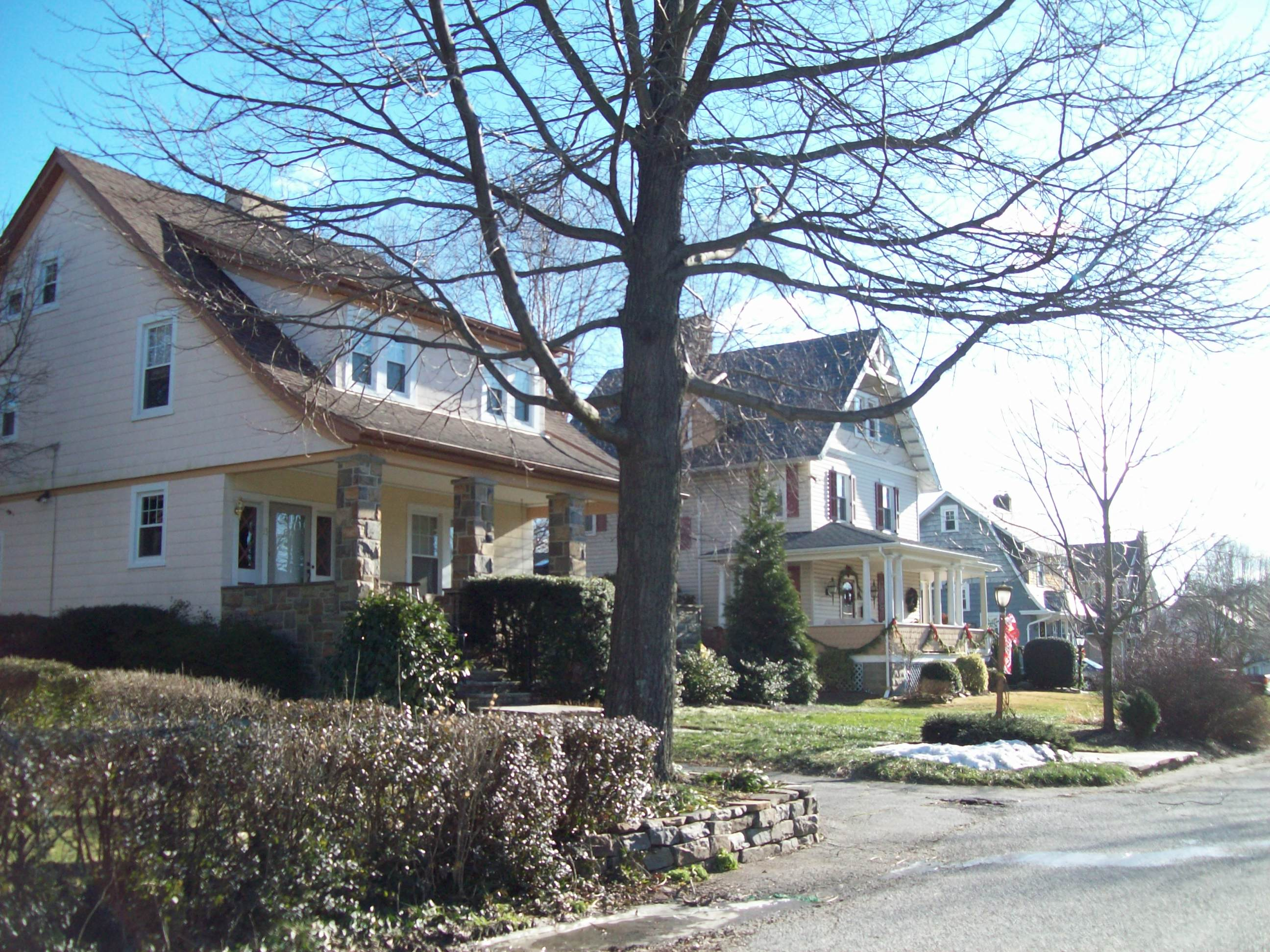
- Streetscape in Old Catonsville Historic District, December 2009

- Location within Maryland Location within the United States
- Location: Bet. Edmondson, Frederick, Melvin and Smithwood Aves., Catonsville, Maryland
- Coordinates: 39°16′20″N 76°44′40″W
- Area: 145 acres (59 ha)
- Built: 1866
- Architect: Kennedy, T.C.; et al.
- Architectural style: Late 19th And 20th Century Revivals, Late 19th And Early 20th Century American Movements
- NRHP reference No.: 02001573
- Added to NRHP: December 27, 2002

Old Catonsville Historic District is a national historic district in Catonsville, Baltimore County, Maryland, United States. It was laid out with the construction of the electric railway and is overwhelmingly residential, with three churches (one with a school), a modern public library, and an Art Deco water tower. Architectural styles in the district range from mid- to late-19th century vernacular "I-houses" to late-19th and early-20th century styles such as Queen Anne, Bungalow, Colonial Revival, Dutch Colonial, Tudor Revival, and Craftsman. A large number of these dwellings have freestanding garages, typically finished in a like manner to their houses.

It was added to the National Register of Historic Places in 2002.
