= Hebbville, Maryland =

- Unincorporated community
- Location within the State of Maryland Hebbville, Maryland (the United States)
- Coordinates: 39°20′29″N 76°45′46″W
- Country: United States
- State: Maryland
- County: Baltimore
- Time zone: UTC-5 (Eastern (EST))
  - Summer (DST): UTC-4 (EDT)

Hebbville is an unincorporated community in Baltimore County, Maryland, United States.
