= Central Catonsville and Summit Park Historic District =

Historic district in Maryland, United States

- U.S. National Register of Historic Places
- U.S. Historic district
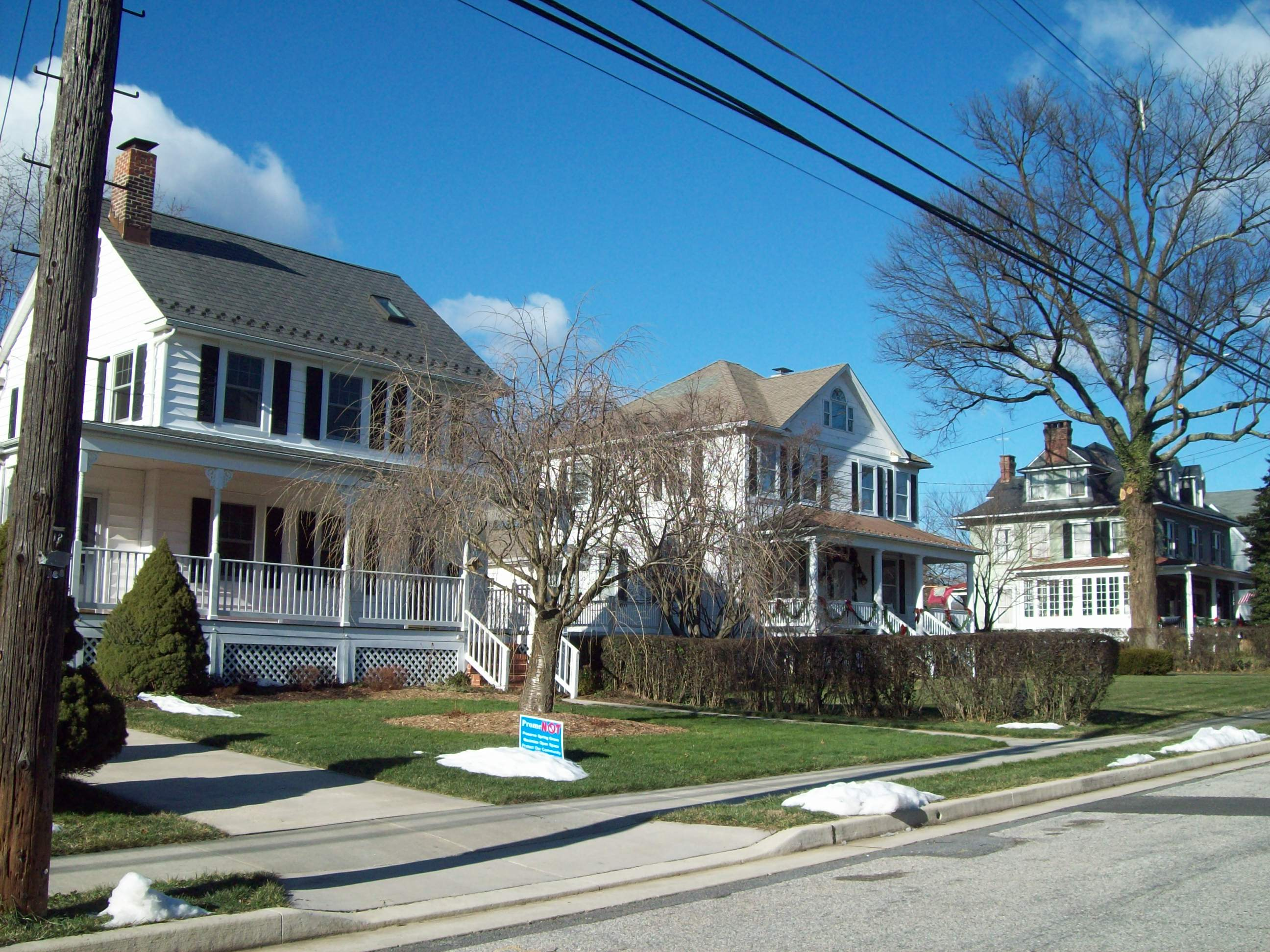
- Streetscape in Central Catonsville and Summit Park Historic District, December 2009

- Location within Maryland Location within the United States
- Location: Bet. Frederick Rd., S. Rolling Rd. and Mellor Ave., Catonsville, Maryland
- Coordinates: 39°16′0″N 76°44′15″W
- Area: 174 acres (70 ha)
- Architect: Gieske, Walter; et al.
- Architectural style: Late 19th And 20th Century Revivals, Late 19th And Early 20th Century American Movements
- NRHP reference No.: 06001186
- Added to NRHP: December 27, 2006

Central Catonsville and Summit Park Historic District is a national historic district in Catonsville, Baltimore County, Maryland, United States. It is entirely residential and consists generally of rectangular lots, the largest lots being found on Frederick Road and Newburg Avenue. These contain the earliest dwellings. The earliest, and the largest house in the district is the Gary Mansion, known as The Summit, built in the 1850s as a summer house in Second Empire style. The Summit Park subdivision takes its name from this house, and surrounds it on all sides. Structures in the district date from 1869 and extends to 1958, by which date the neighborhood had substantially achieved its present form and appearance.

It was added to the National Register of Historic Places in 2006.
