= List of colleges and universities in Baltimore =

Flag of Baltimore, Maryland

Baltimore, Maryland is home to numerous universities and colleges both public and private. The following includes a list of the educational institutions throughout Baltimore City and Baltimore County.

== Public four-year colleges and universities ==
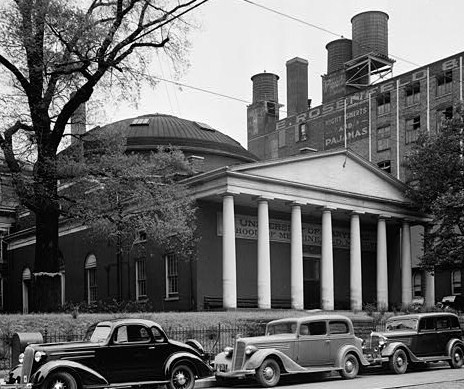
University of Maryland, Medical Building, July 1936

Name	Location	Founded	Enrollment	References
Coppin State University	Baltimore	1900	4,357	
Morgan State University	Baltimore	1867	6,616	
Towson University	Towson	1866	20,124	
University of Baltimore	Baltimore	1925	5,009	
University of Maryland, Baltimore	Baltimore	1807	5,874	
University of Maryland, Baltimore County	Catonsville/Arbutus	1966	11,920	

== Private, non-profit colleges and universities ==
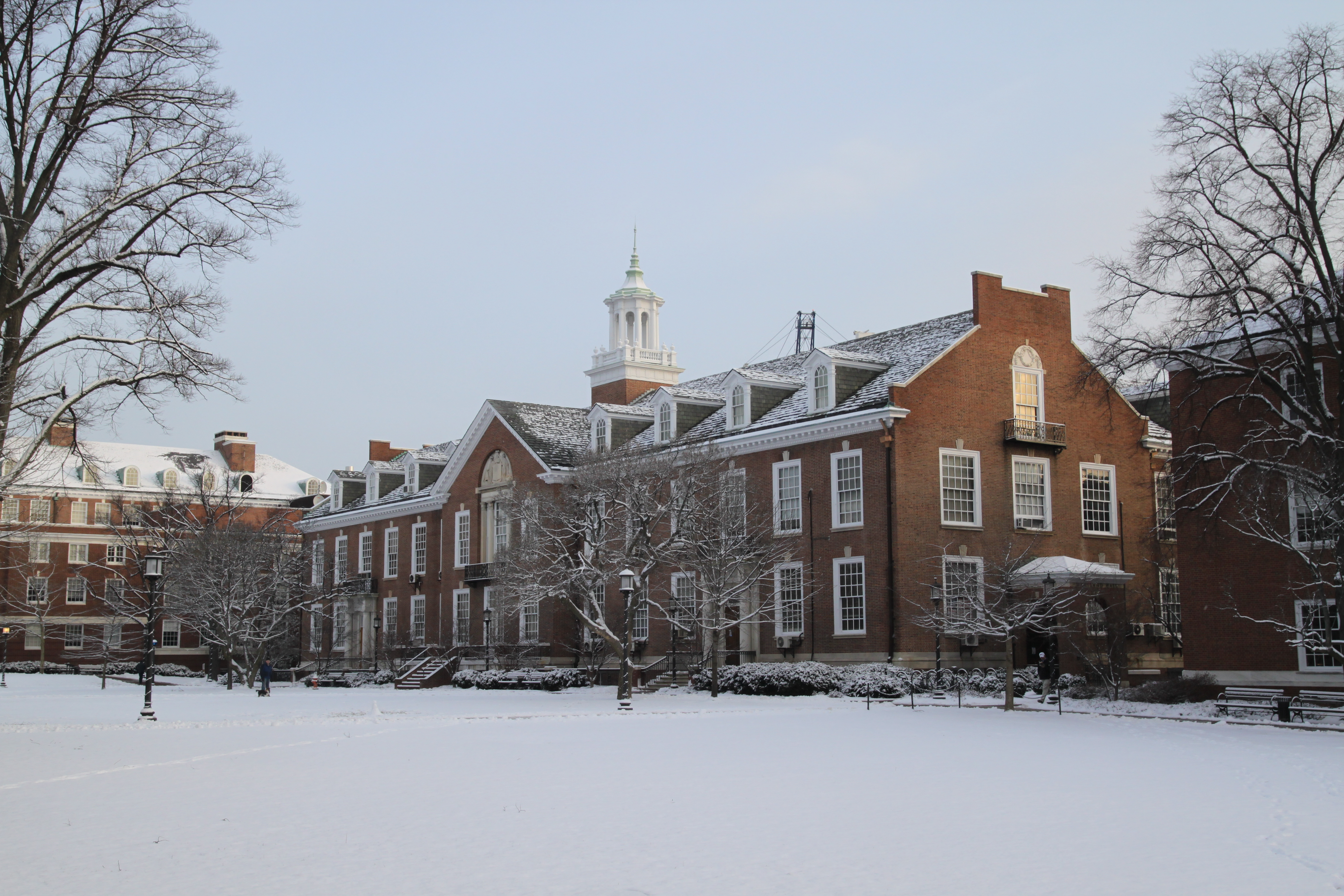
Maryland Hall at Johns Hopkins University

Name	Location	Founded	Enrollment	References
Goucher College	Towson	1885	2,362	
Johns Hopkins University	Baltimore	1876	18,753	
Loyola University Maryland	Baltimore	1852	6,028	
Maryland Institute College of Art	Baltimore	1826	1,899	
Notre Dame of Maryland University	Baltimore	1873	4,878	
Stevenson University	Owings Mills	1947	3,579	
