= Harry L. Norris =

American businessman (1885–1948)

Harry L. Norris (1885 – January 14, 1948) was an American pioneer in dairy distribution.

== Biography ==
Harry L. Norris was born in Baltimore, Maryland, in 1885, and began work with the Baltimore and Ohio Railroad (B&O) at age 11. He began as a messenger boy for the telegraph department. His hard work led to several promotions, and in 1912 he became the traveling baggage agent for the railroad. In 1916, Norris's responsibilities were expanded to include the milk business, a labor-intensive and vital part of train service to dairy farmers and consumers. He developed depots along train routes were farmers could gather their milk cans for transportation to the city, using freight trains that allowed for packing milk cans in ice. Due to his experience with the problems inherent in this system, he was asked to assist in the development of a milk tank car by rail car manufacturers. The results were a 6,000 gallon insulated tanker that greatly simplified transportation of milk, and reduced costs.

Norris resigned his position with the B&O in 1926 and began a new phase of his career. He was president of the Flavorite Ice Cream Co. in Washington, D.C., and began his own company with his sons, the Norris Milk Products Company. He was a co-founder and treasurer of the National Association of Independent Ice Cream Manufacturers.

Norris lived with his wife and 3 children for many years on Leeds Avenue in Arbutus, Maryland, a short walk from the railroad tracks. He organized the Arbutus Community Association and the Arbutus Educational and Social Association, which eventually built the Arbutus Community Hall.
