= George Washington's resignation as commander-in-chief =

December 23, 1783 event in the US

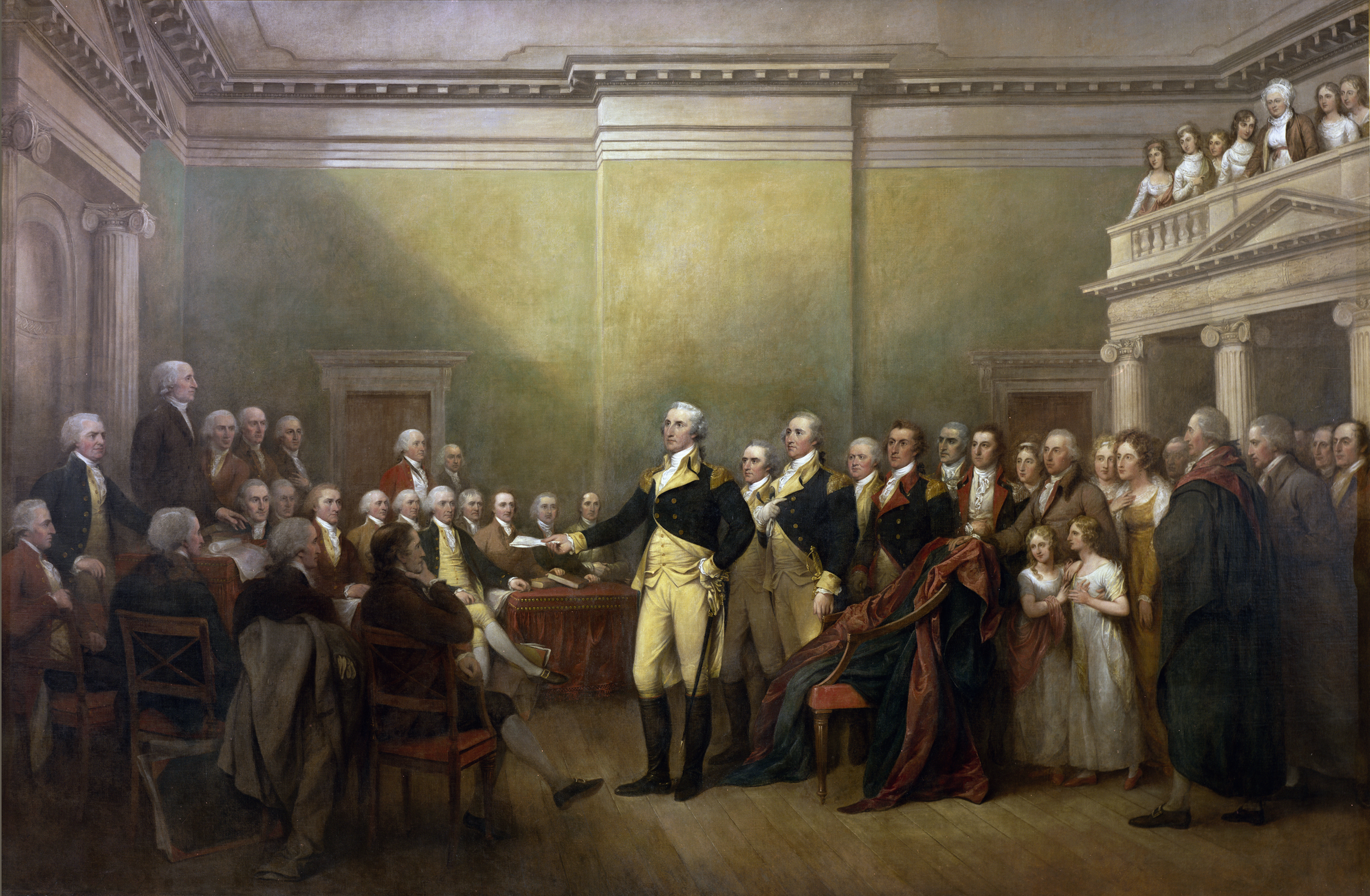
- General George Washington Resigning His Commission by John Trumbull
- Date: December 23, 1783
- Venue: Maryland State House
- Location: Annapolis, Maryland, U.S.; 38°58′43″N 76°29′28″W

George Washington's resignation as commander-in-chief marked the end of Washington's military service in the American Revolutionary War and his return to civilian life at Mount Vernon.

His voluntary action has been described as "one of the nation's great acts of statesmanship" and helped establish the precedent of civilian control of the military. After the Treaty of Paris ending the war had been signed on September 3, 1783, and after the last British troops left New York City on November 25, Washington resigned his commission as commander-in-chief of the Continental Army to the Congress of the Confederation, then meeting in the Maryland State House at Annapolis, Maryland, on December 23 of the same year. This followed his farewell to the Continental Army, November 2 at Rockingham near Princeton, New Jersey, and his farewell to his officers, December 4 at Fraunces Tavern in New York City.

Washington's resignation was depicted by John Trumbull in 1824 with the life-size painting, General George Washington Resigning His Commission, now on view in the United States Capitol rotunda.

== History ==
Washington arrived at Annapolis on December 19, 1783, and was greeted by General William Smallwood and General Horatio Gates at the Three Mile Oak. The next day, he wrote to Congress about the method to resign, whether in person or by writing. The President of the Continental Congress, Thomas Mifflin, appointed a committee of Thomas Jefferson, James McHenry, and Elbridge Gerry to determine the details. On Monday, December 22, Congress honored Washington with a feast at Mann's Tavern, attended by between two and three hundred gentlemen. Later that night, a public ball was held in his honor by Maryland Governor William Paca at the State House. Nearly six hundred guests attended. Historian Willard Sterne Randall describes the evening: "George Washington, a famous dancer, astonished French officers with his skill and grace at the minuet."

At noon, on Tuesday, December 23, Charles Thomson, secretary of the Continental Congress, led Washington, accompanied by two of his aides-de-camp, Col. David Humphreys and Col. Benjamin Walker, into the Senate Chamber of the Maryland State House. While depicted in some paintings of the event, Martha Washington was not actually in attendance. Then Washington delivered his remarks to the assembly:

Happy in the confirmation of our Independence and Sovereignty, and pleased with the opportunity afforded the United States of becoming a respectable Nation, I resign with satisfaction the Appointment I accepted with diffidence.
…
I consider it an indispensable duty to close this last solemn act of my Official life, by commending the Interests of our dearest Country to the protection of Almighty God, and those who have the superintendence of them, to his holy keeping.

Having now finished the work assigned me, I retire from the great theatre of Action; and bidding an Affectionate farewell to this August body under whose orders I have so long acted, I here offer my Commission, and take my leave of all the employments of public life.

— George Washington

As the last act of his resignation, Washington handed his commission and his speech to President Mifflin. The next day, December 24, Washington left for his residence, Mount Vernon.

== Legacy ==
Brown University historian Gordon S. Wood, the recipient of the 1993 Pulitzer Prize for History for The Radicalism of the American Revolution (1992), writes in his book:

George Washington, of course, was the perfect Cincinnatus, the Roman patriot that returned to his farm after his victories in war. ... The greatest act of his life, the one that gave him his greatest fame, was his resignation as commander in chief of the American forces.

On May 3, 1797, King George III told the American painter Benjamin West his opinion of Washington (as reported by West to ambassador Rufus King):

In regard to General Washington, he told him since his resignation that in his opinion "that act closing and finishing what had gone before and viewed in connection with it, place him in a light the most distinguished of any man living, and that he thought him the greatest character of the age."

The American artist, John Trumbull, a former aide-de-camp to Washington, after receiving word of Washington's resignation, wrote to his brother Jonathan Trumbull Jr. that it:

excites the astonishment and admiration of this part of the world. 'Tis a Conduct so novel, so inconceivable to People, who, far from giving up powers they possess, are willing to convulse the Empire to acquire more.

Later, in describing his painting, General George Washington Resigning His Commission, Trumbull considered Washington's resignation "one of the highest moral lessons ever given to the world". The historian Thomas Fleming described the significance of the event:

This was – is – the most important moment in American history. The man who could have dispersed a feckless Congress and obtained for himself and his officers riches worthy of their courage was renouncing absolute power to become a private citizen. He was putting himself at the mercy of politicians over whom he had no control and in whom he had little confidence.

== Artistic depictions ==
Washington's resignation has been depicted by several artists in both paintings and sculptures. Raimondo Trentanove carved a bas-relief of this scene on the pedestal of Antonio Canova's George Washington that was installed in the North Carolina State House in 1821. Both were destroyed by fire in 1831. Trumbull's 1824 life-size painting, General George Washington Resigning His Commission, can be seen in the United States Capitol rotunda. In 1829, the sculptor Enrico Causici completed the statue of Washington resigning his commission that is atop the Washington Monument in Baltimore. In 1840, Horatio Greenough completed his sculpture of Washington returning power to the people. It is now at the National Museum of American History. About 1841, Ferdinand Pettrich sculpted a painted plaster sculpture, Washington Resigning His Commission, now at the Smithsonian American Art Museum. In 1858, Edwin White painted Washington Resigning His Commission, on commission from the Maryland Legislature. It is on display in the Grand Staircase of the Maryland State House. In 1903, Edwin Blashfield created the mural, Washington Surrendering His Commission, which depicts Washington laying his commission at the feet of Columbia. It is located in the Clarence Mitchell Courthouse in Baltimore.

== Gallery ==
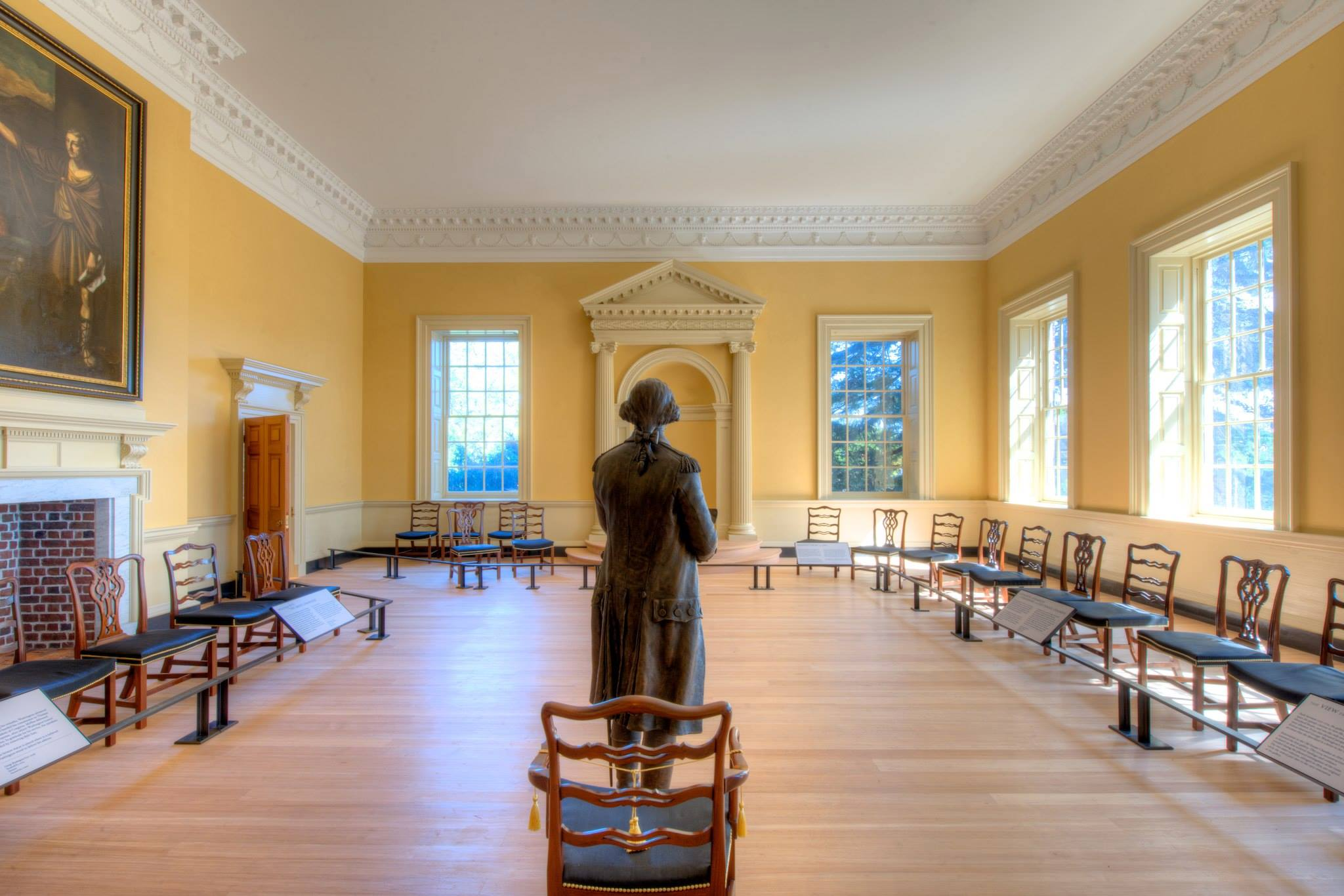
Bronze statue of George Washington resigning his commission in the Old Senate Chamber of the Maryland State House

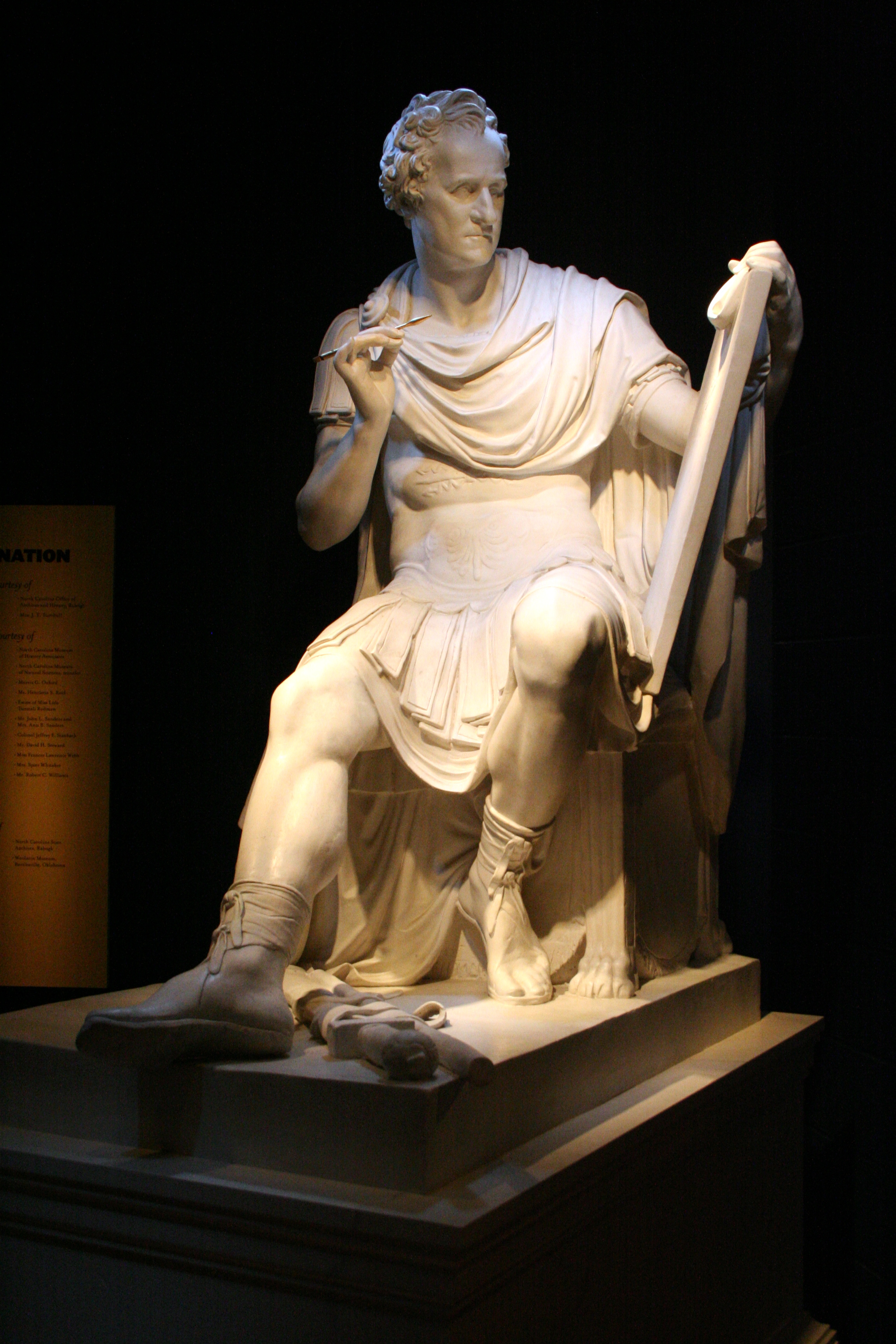
George Washington
by Antonio Canova, plaster replica

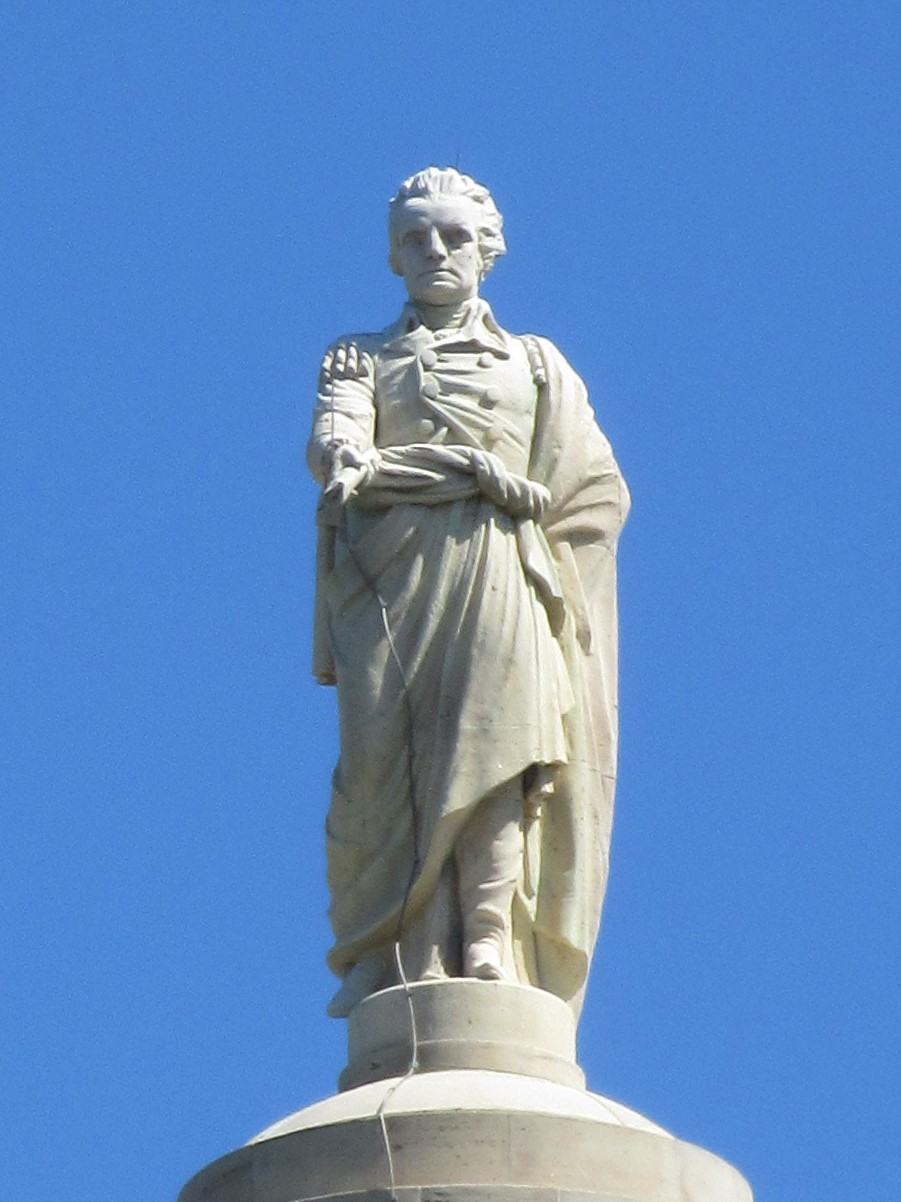
George Washington resigning his commission atop the Washington Monument in Baltimore
by Enrico Causici, 1829

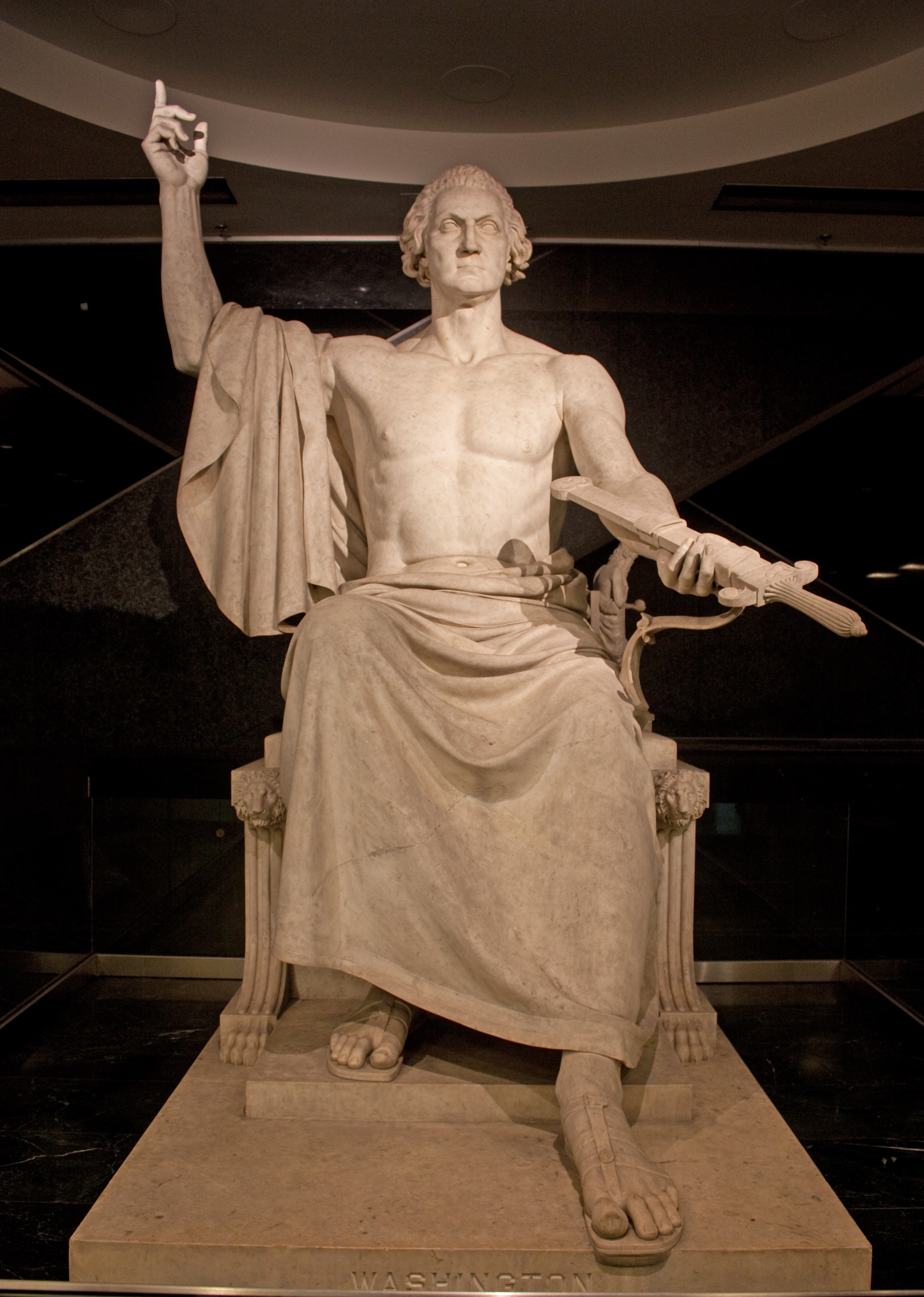
George Washington
by Horatio Greenough, 1840

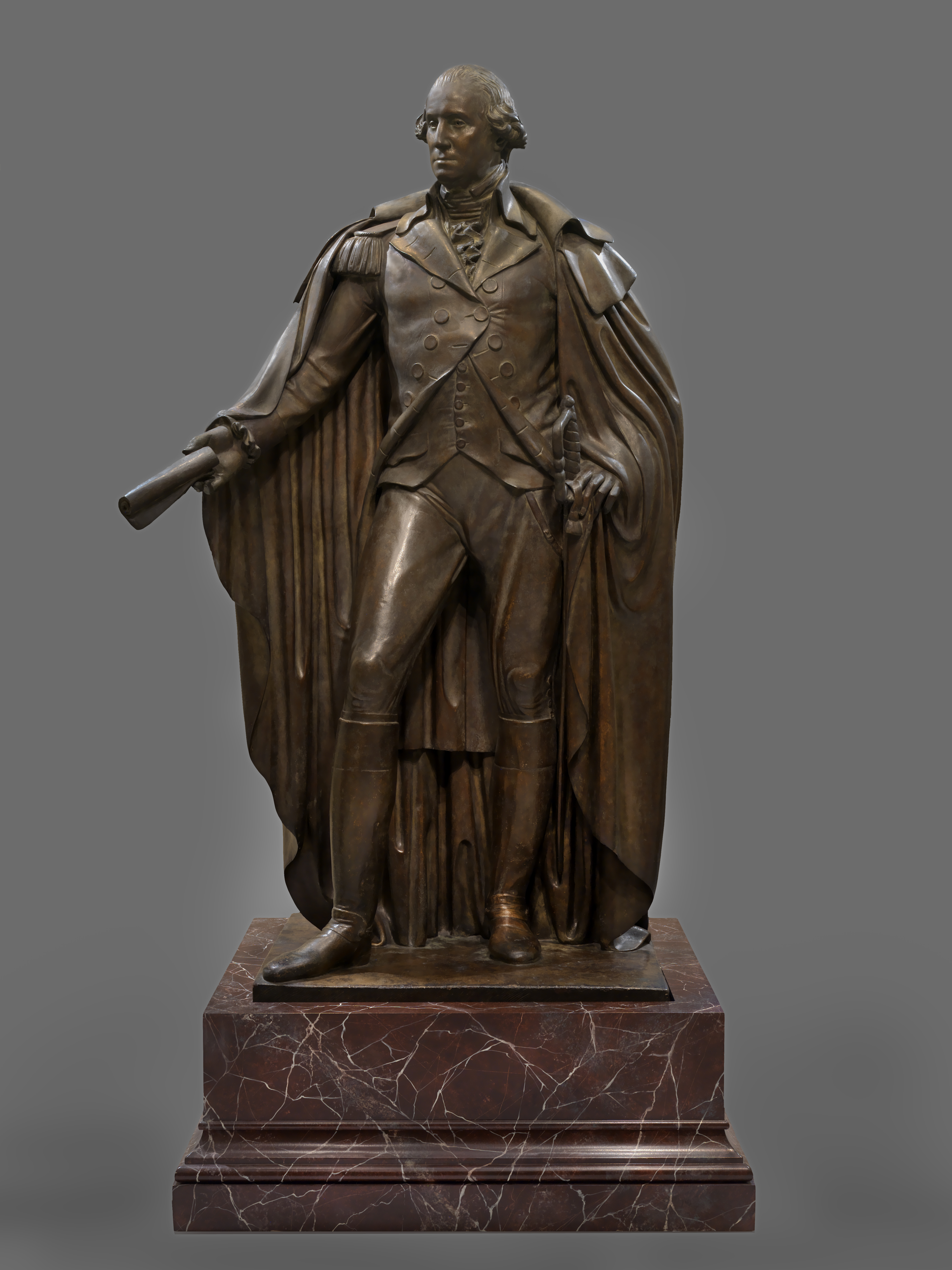
Washington Resigning His Commission
by Ferdinand Pettrich, c. 1841

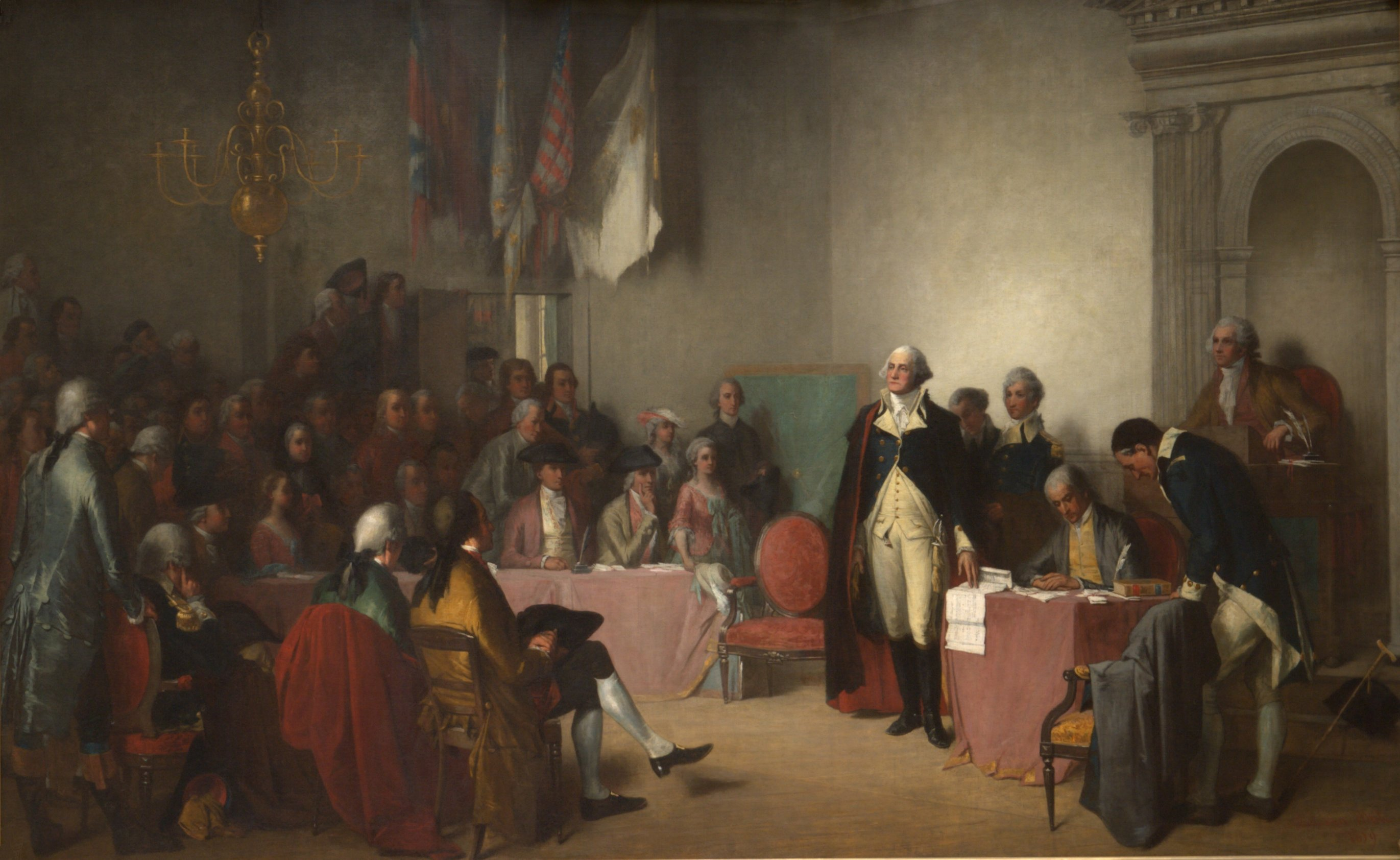
Washington Resigning His Commission
by Edwin White, 1858

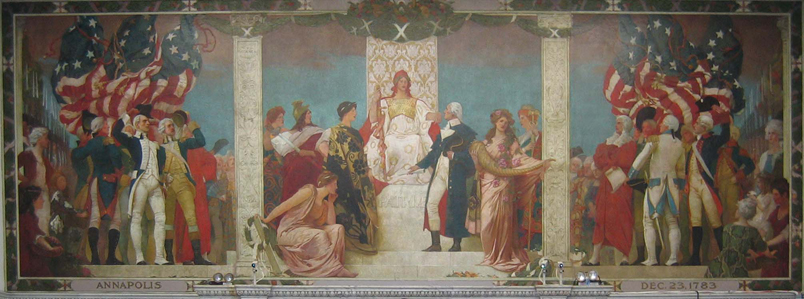
Washington Surrendering His Commission
by Edwin Blashfield, 1903

== See also ==
- List of George Washington articles
- Newburgh Conspiracy
- Newburgh letter
