= Arbutus Oak =

Historic tree in the middle of a highway interchange in Maryland, US

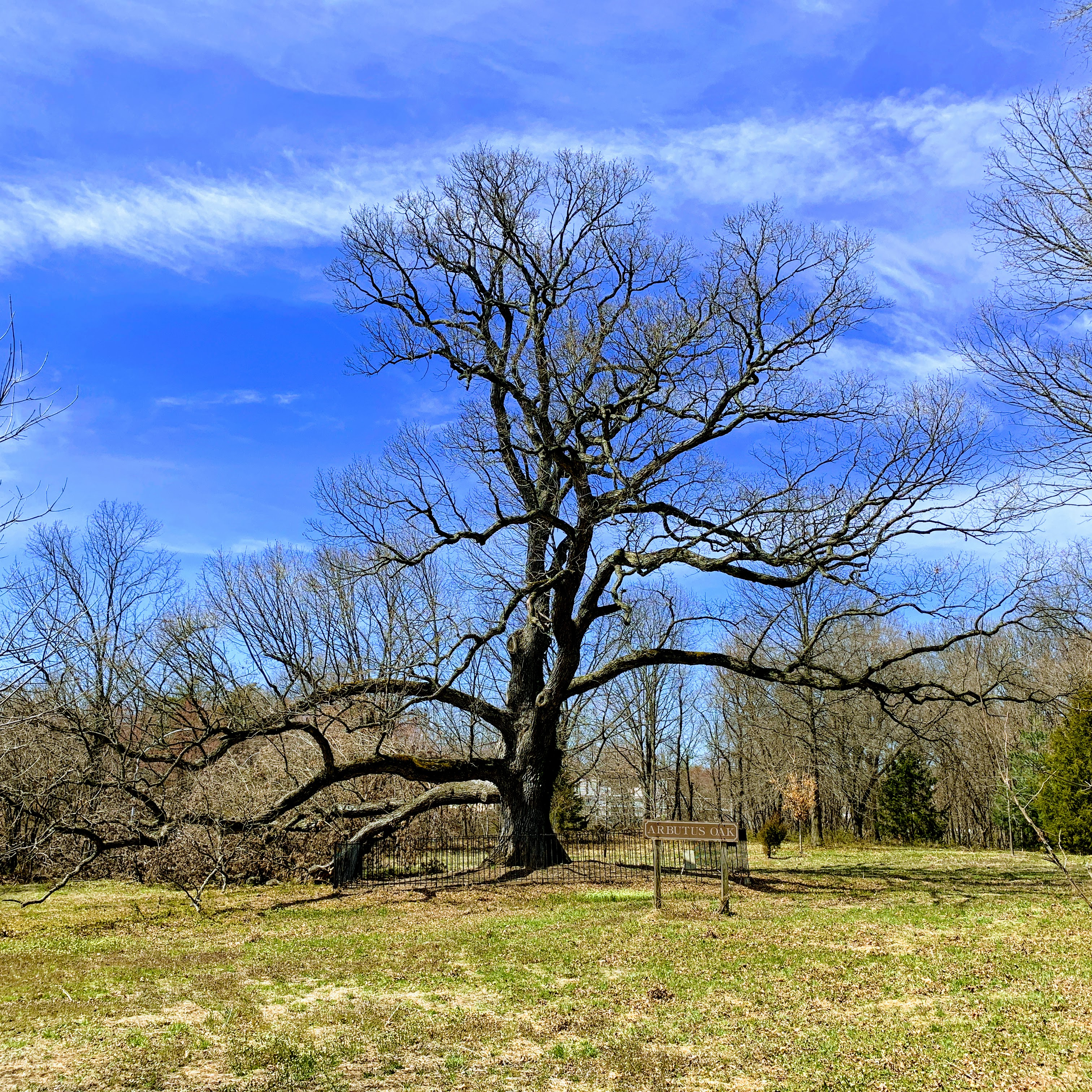
- The Arbutus Oak in March 2019 as seen on a partly cloudy day facing north
- Interactive map of Arbutus Oak
- Species: White oak (Quercus alba)
- Location: Arbutus, Maryland
- Coordinates: 39°15′03″N 76°40′57″W
- Date seeded: c. 1690; 336 years ago
- Custodian: Arbutus Community Association

The Arbutus Oak was a large white oak tree in Arbutus, Maryland, situated in the southwest corner of the I-695/I-95 interchange approximately four miles southwest of Baltimore. It split in half and fell in 2019, due to internal decay that caused its trunk to become unstable. At that time, it was thought to be 329 years old.

== Significance ==
The Arbutus Oak was over 70 feet (21 m) tall and about 5 feet (1.5 m) in diameter, making it one of Maryland's largest and oldest white oak trees. According to local legend, General Gilbert du Motier, Marquis de Lafayette passed by the oak tree in 1781 with his troops while en route to Elkridge during the Revolutionary War. When the highway interchange was being constructed in the 1950s, the government found Native American artifacts surrounding the tree. The historic nature of the tree prompted highway planners to adjust the highway ramp southward in order to save the tree.

== Site ==
Located on Maryland State Highway Administration property and surrounded by interstate freeways and ramps, the tree was inaccessible to the general public. The tree and a sign bearing its name were visible to motorists on I-95 southbound, just south of the I-695 underpass.

The Arbutus Lion's Club installed a fence around the tree in 1972. A plaque on the fence reads:

THE ARBUTUS OAK / DEDICATED TO THE CITIZENS OF ARBUTUS AND HALETHORPE / 1972 / SPONSORED BY THE LIONS CLUB OF ARBUTUS / ESTIMATED TO BE 300 YEARS OLD IN 1990

Emanuel Wade, the original landowner of the area on which the tree stood, is buried in the vicinity of the tree; his gravestone was moved from its original location to inside the fence that surrounded the tree.

== Gallery ==
Arbutus Oak
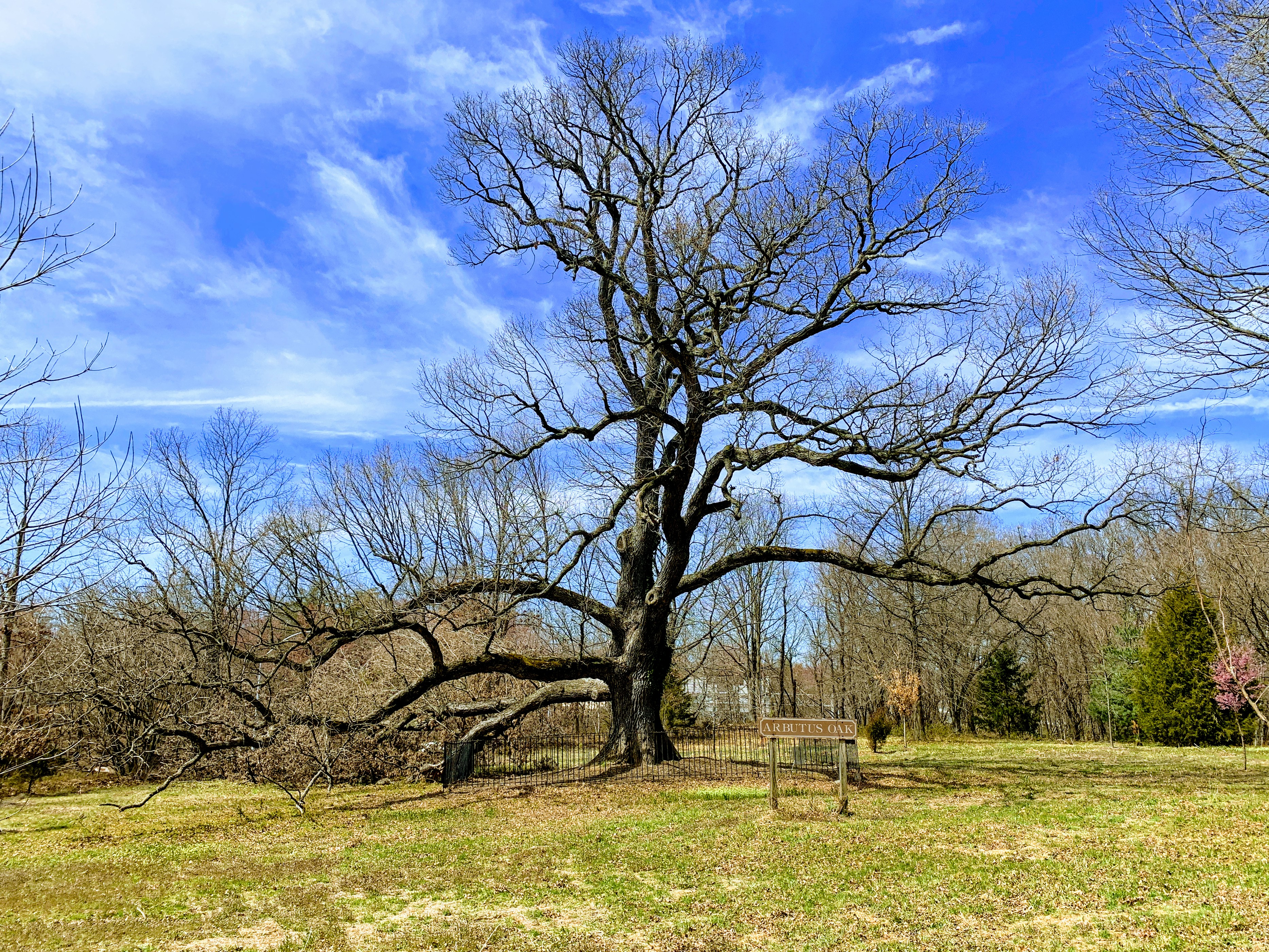
Wide-angle photo of the Arbutus Oak, a historic tree in Baltimore County, Maryland.

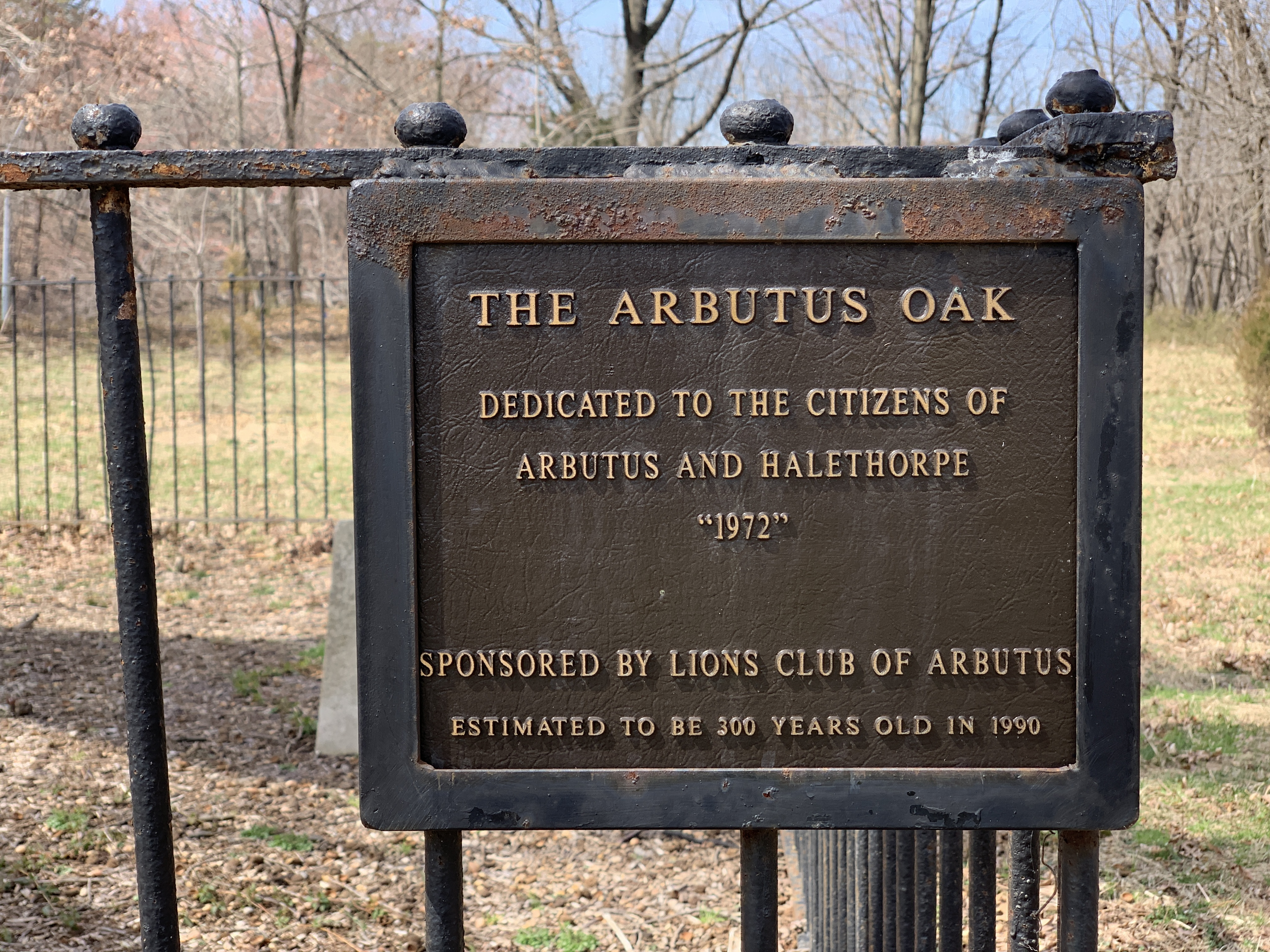
A plaque describing the Arbutus Oak, a historic tree

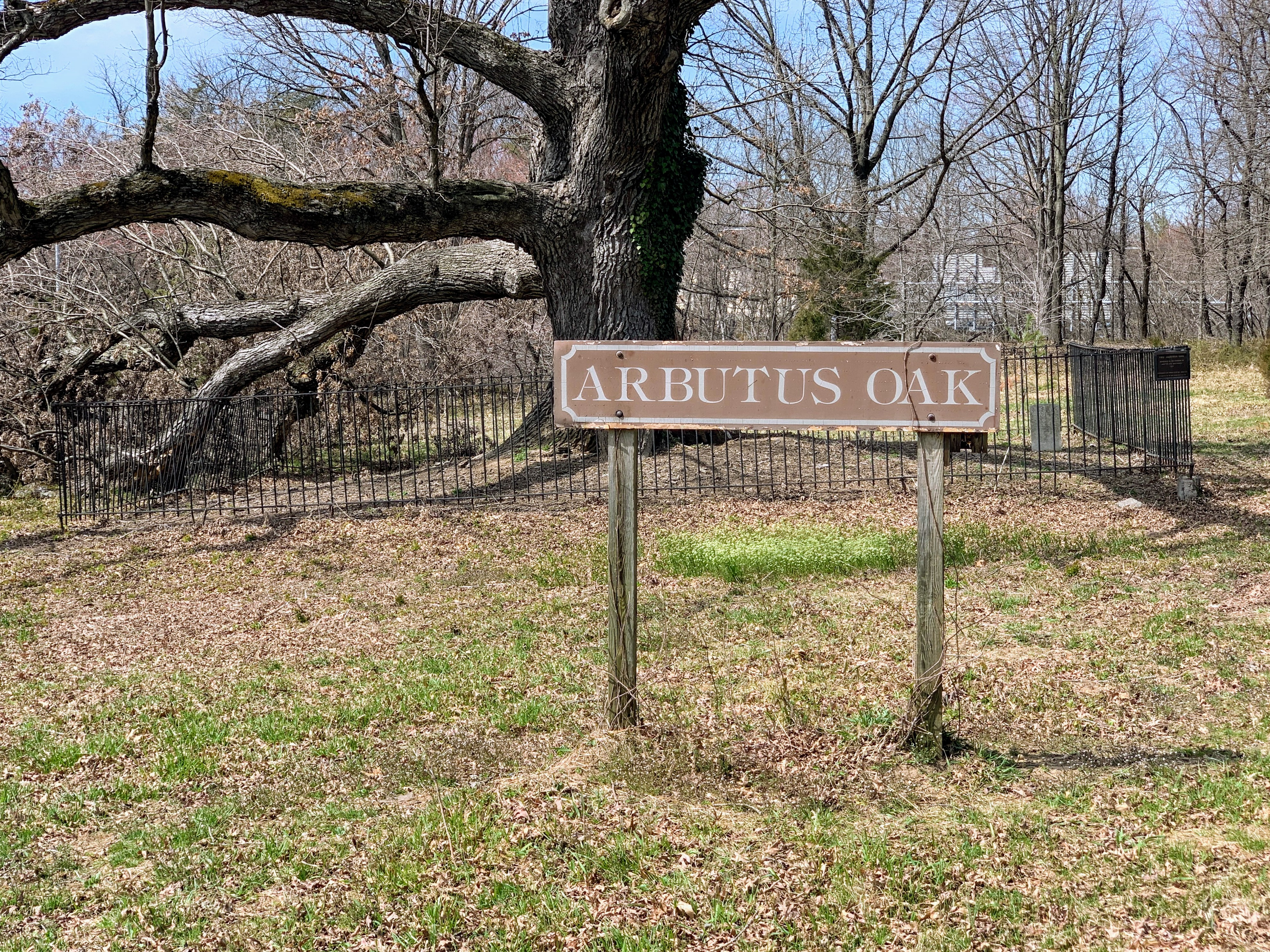
The sign for the historic Arbutus Oak tree

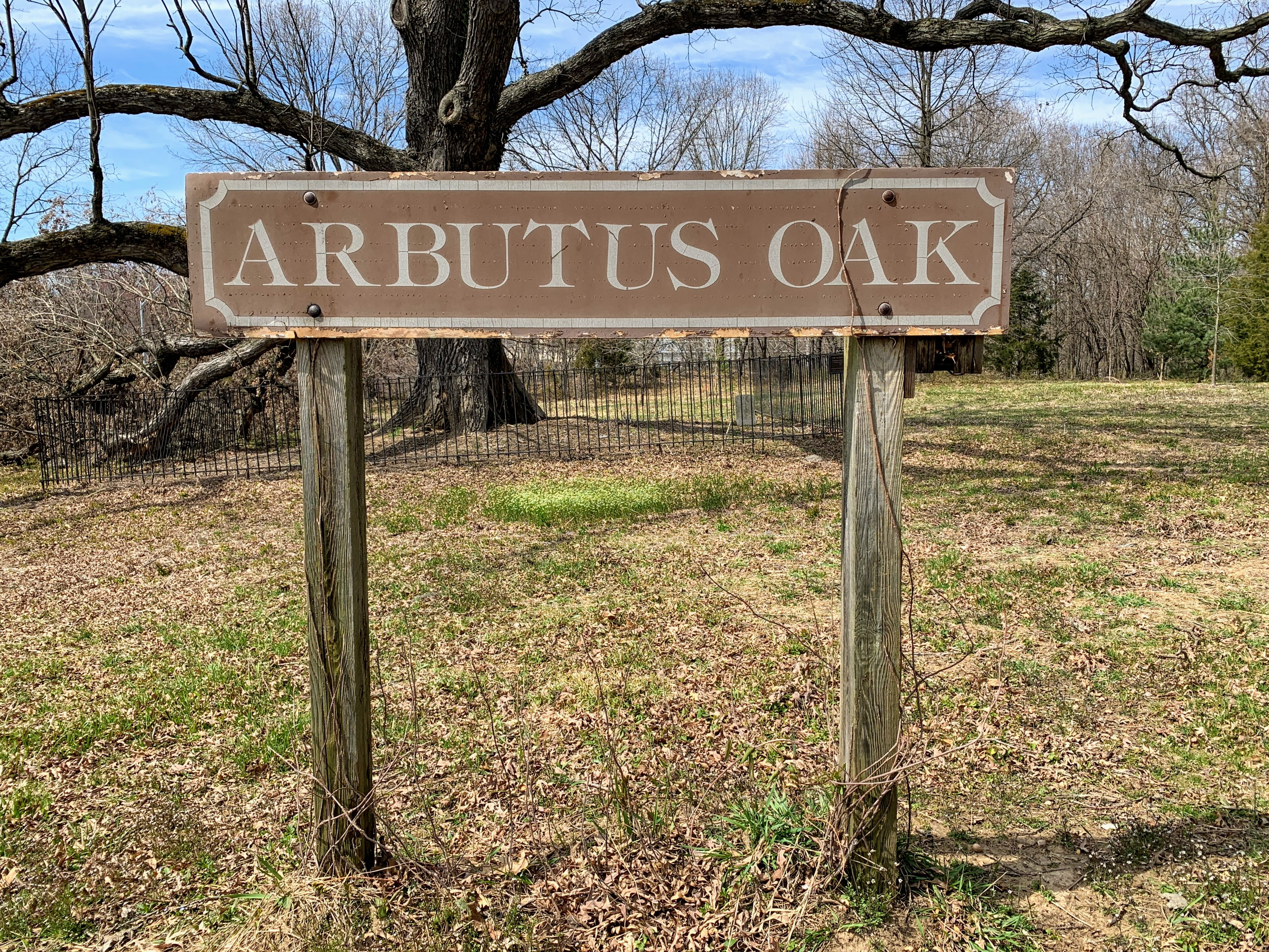
Closeup shot of the sign for the historic Arbutus Oak tree

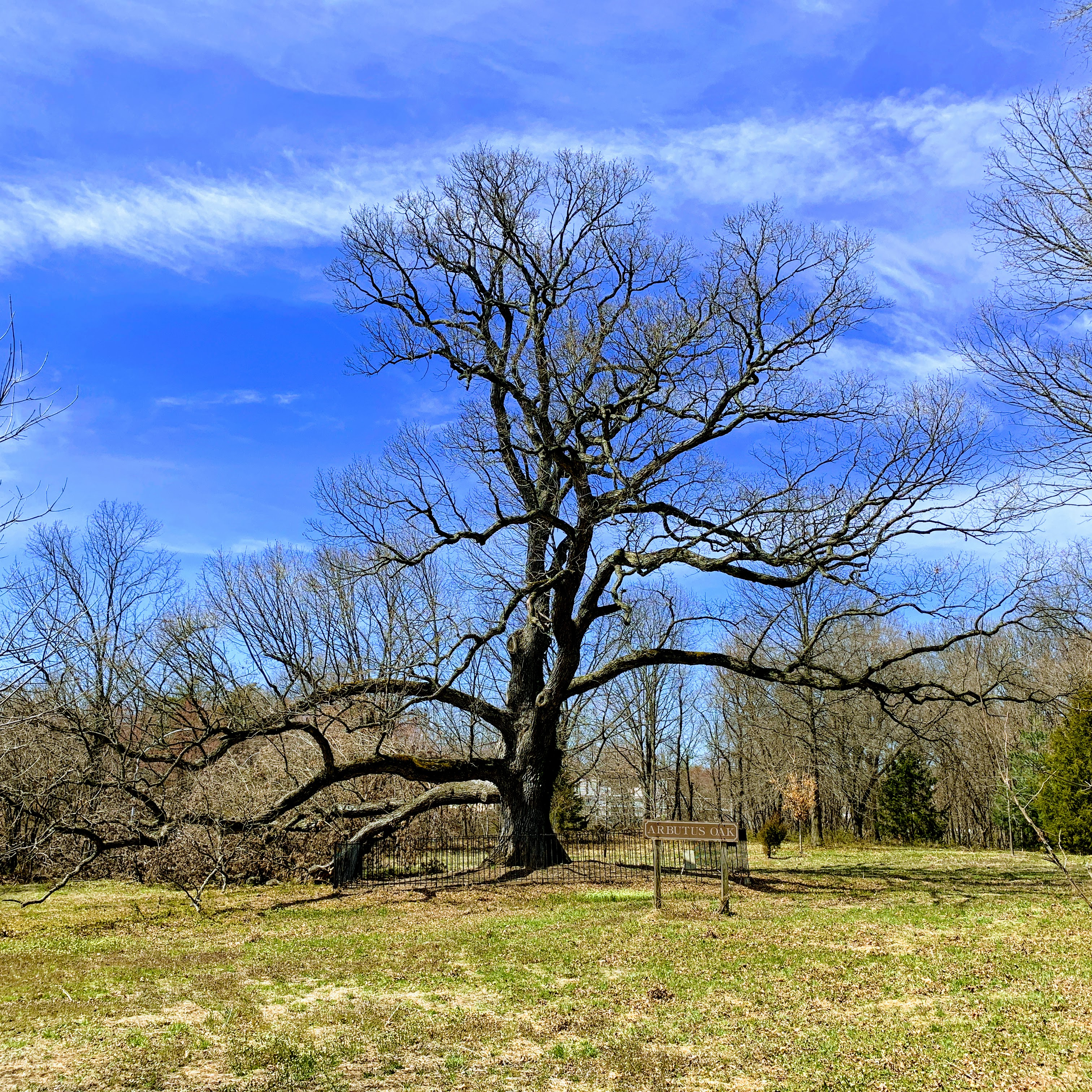
Square aspect ratio of the Arbutus Oak, a historic tree in Baltimore County, Maryland.

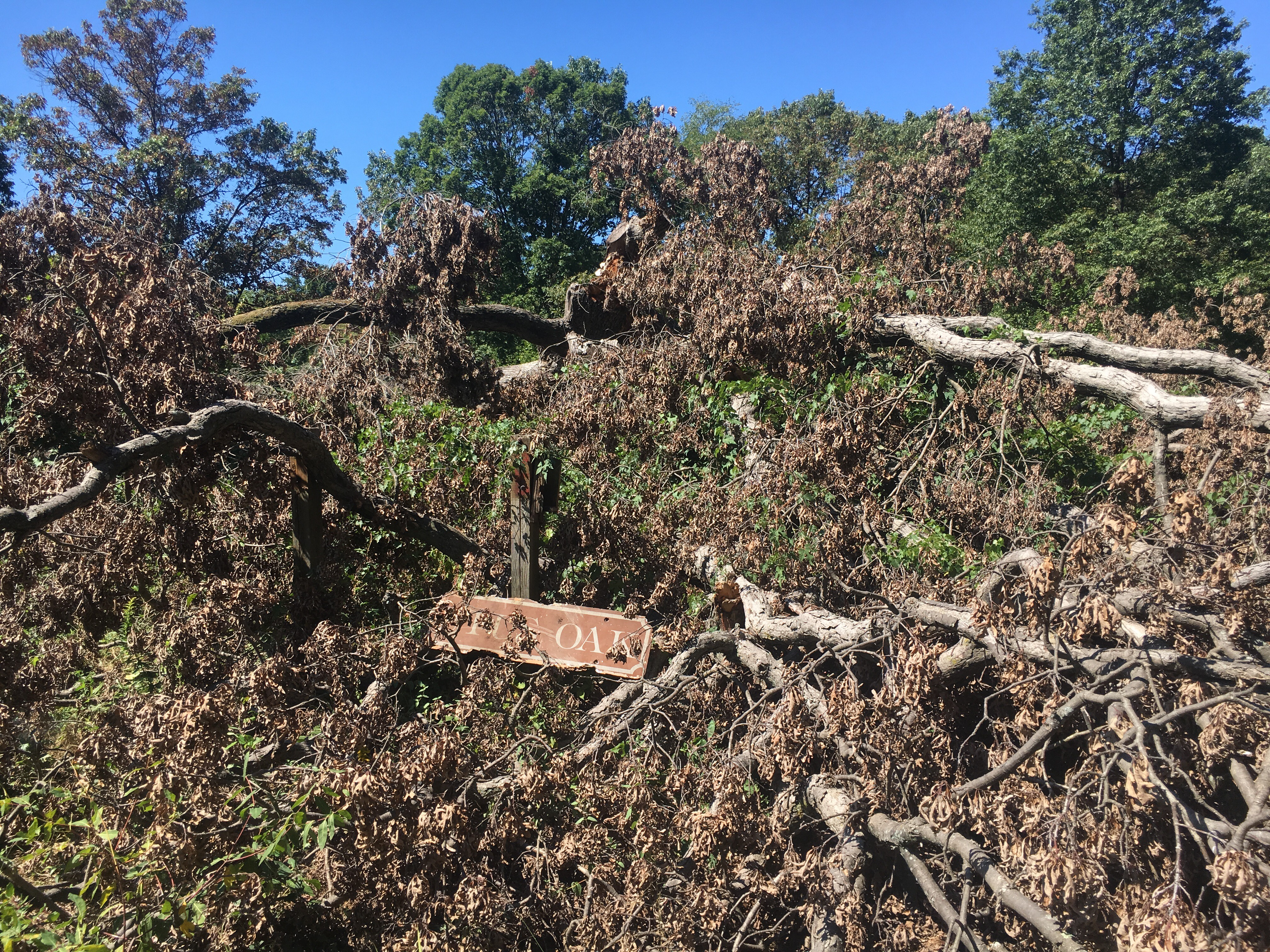
The fallen Arbutus Oak looking west

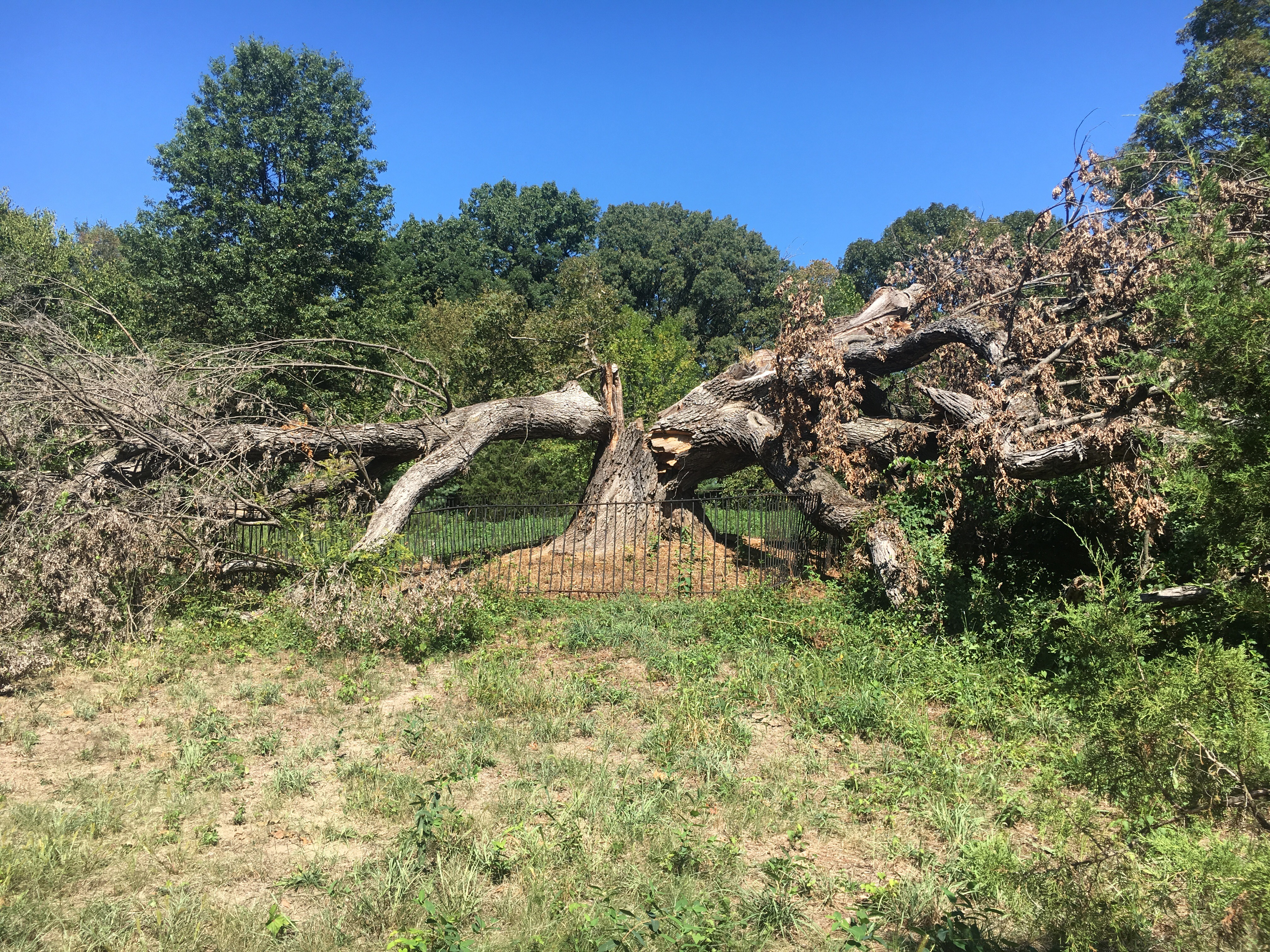
The fallen Arbutus Oak looking north

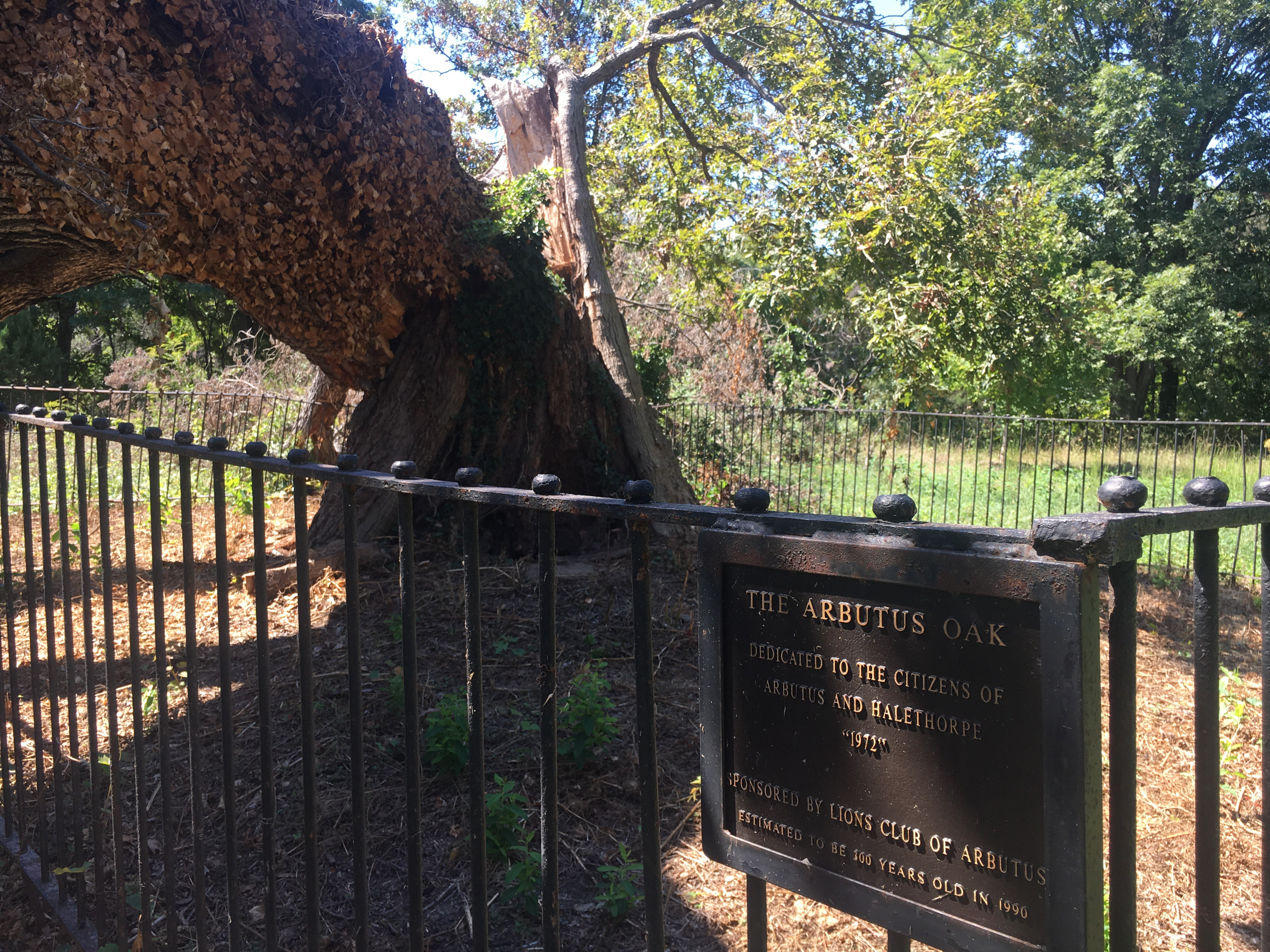
The fallen Arbutus Oak with descriptive plaque in the foreground
Photos of the historic Arbutus Oak and surrounds.

== See also ==
- Wye Oak, a larger white oak in Wye Mills, Maryland that was destroyed by a windstorm in 2002.
- Linden Oak, a white oak tree in Bethesda, Maryland that was saved during the construction of the Washington Metro Red Line.
- Three Mile Oak, was a white oak tree near Annapolis, Maryland that was the site of George Washington's resignation as a commissioned army officer.
- Presbyterian Church in Basking Ridge, which was home to another oak tree with connections to the American Revolution and George Washington.
- List of individual trees
