= Statue of George Washington (Smithsonian American Art Museum) =

1815 statue by William Rush in Philadelphia

Washington Resigning His Commission
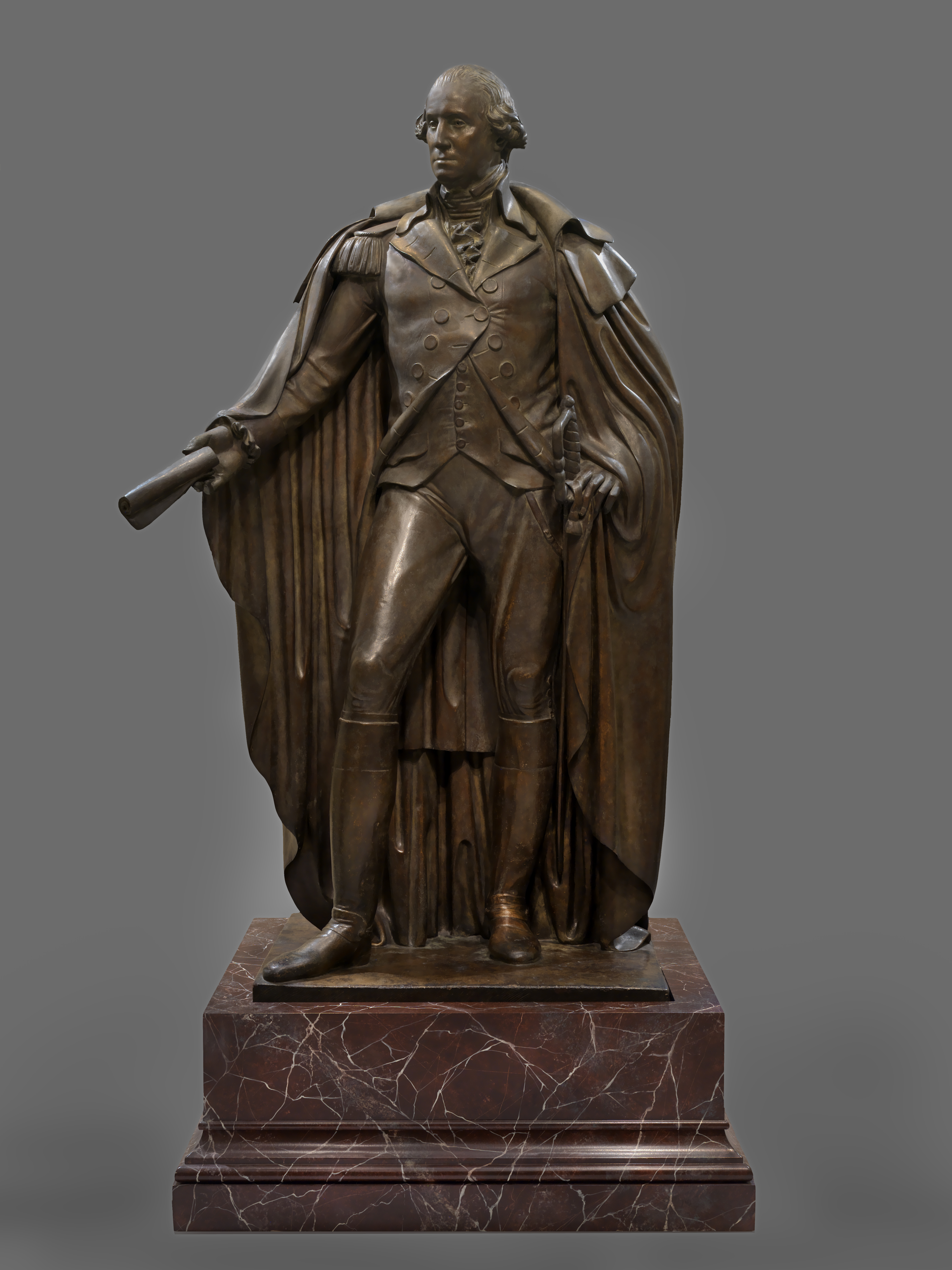
- Washington Resigning His Commission by Ferdinand Pettrich
- Artist: Ferdinand Pettrich
- Year: c. 1841
- Medium: Painted plaster
- Dimensions: 2.2 m (7.1 ft)
- Location: Smithsonian American Art Museum; Washington, D.C., United States; 38°53′53″N 77°1′23″W

Washington Resigning His Commission is a life-size plaster statue of General George Washington by the sculptor Ferdinand Pettrich created around 1841. It depicts George Washington's resignation as commander-in-chief of the Continental Army and is on display at the Smithsonian American Art Museum in Washington, D.C..

== See also ==
- 1841 in art
- Cultural depictions of George Washington
- List of memorials to George Washington
- List of statues of George Washington
