= Linden Oak =

Historic oak tree in North Bethesda, Maryland, US

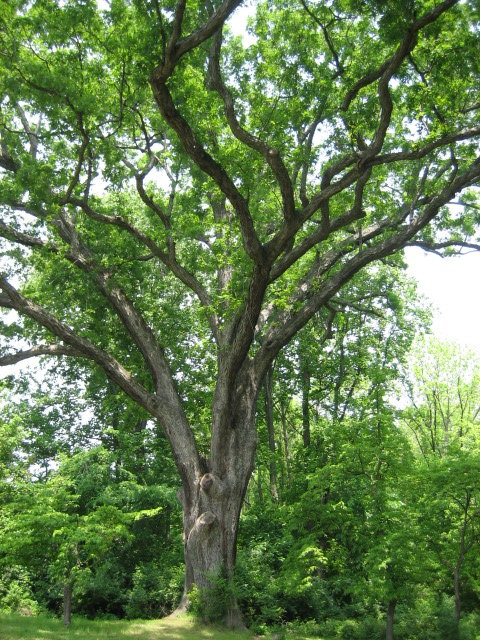
- Linden Oak, May 2007
- Interactive map of Linden Oak
- Species: White oak (Quercus alba)
- Location: North Bethesda, Maryland
- Coordinates: 39°01′22″N 77°06′08″W
- Date seeded: c. 1718; 308 years ago
- Date felled: July 18, 2023
- Custodian: Maryland-National Capital Park and Planning Commission

The Linden Oak was a large white oak tree in North Bethesda, Maryland, beside the junction of Rockville Pike and Rock Creek Park's Beach Drive.

Believed to have been seeded around 1718, the white oak was among the country's oldest. It was 97 feet (30 m) with a crown spread of 132 feet (40 m) when measured by the Maryland Big Tree Program in February 2008. The tree died in 2022 and was removed in July 2023.

== Significance ==
The tree was seeded around 1718, according to a 1978 assessment of the tree's historic value for the Maryland Historic Trust. The origin of the name "Linden Oak" is unknown.

In 1976, the state's Maryland Bicentennial Commission proclaimed the oak a Maryland Bicentennial Tree because it "stood its ground, survived the American Revolution, and continues to serve an appreciative nation."

In the early 1980s, planners of the Washington Metro transit line changed the planned course of the Red Line to spare the tree at an estimated cost of $2 to 4 million.

In 2020, the tree lost an enormous branch. By spring 2022, the tree had died, at an estimated age of more than 300 years.

On June 10, 2023, officials said that the tree would be removed during the week of June 12, 2023, citing safety concerns. Local government and civic groups discussed with the park service ways to honor the Linden Oak's place in the community history. They decided that the tree's lower trunk would remain onsite as a memorial after its removal, and a portion of the tree's wood would be made into a sculpture by a local chainsaw artist. Montgomery Parks postponed the removal until early to mid-July pending a Historic Area Work Permit.

The tree was removed on July 18, 2023. A part of the felled Linden Oak was carved into a bench by local "chainsaw artist" Colin Vale. It was installed at Ken-Gar Palisades Park in nearby Kensington in December 2023.

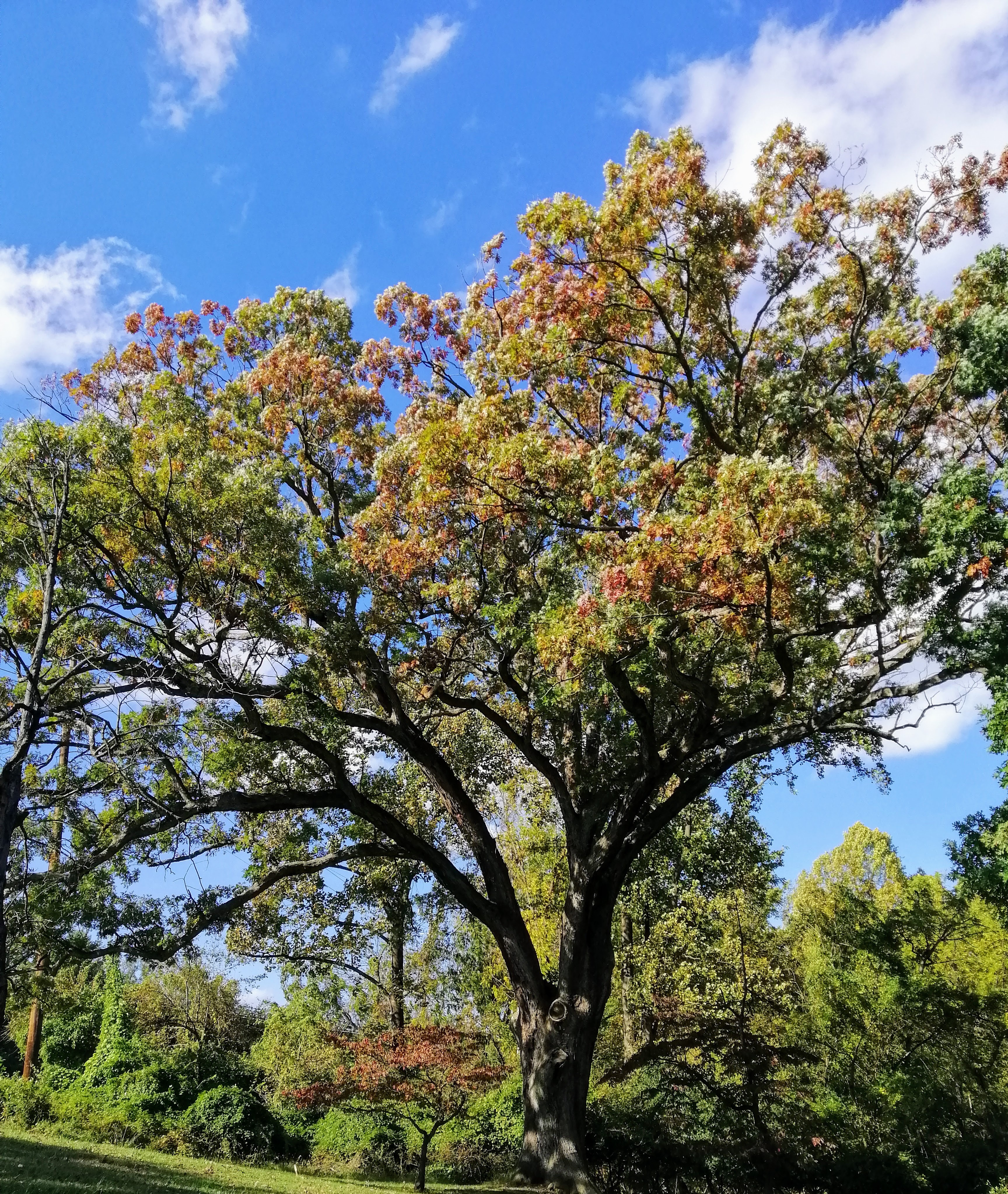
The Linden Oak Tree 2020

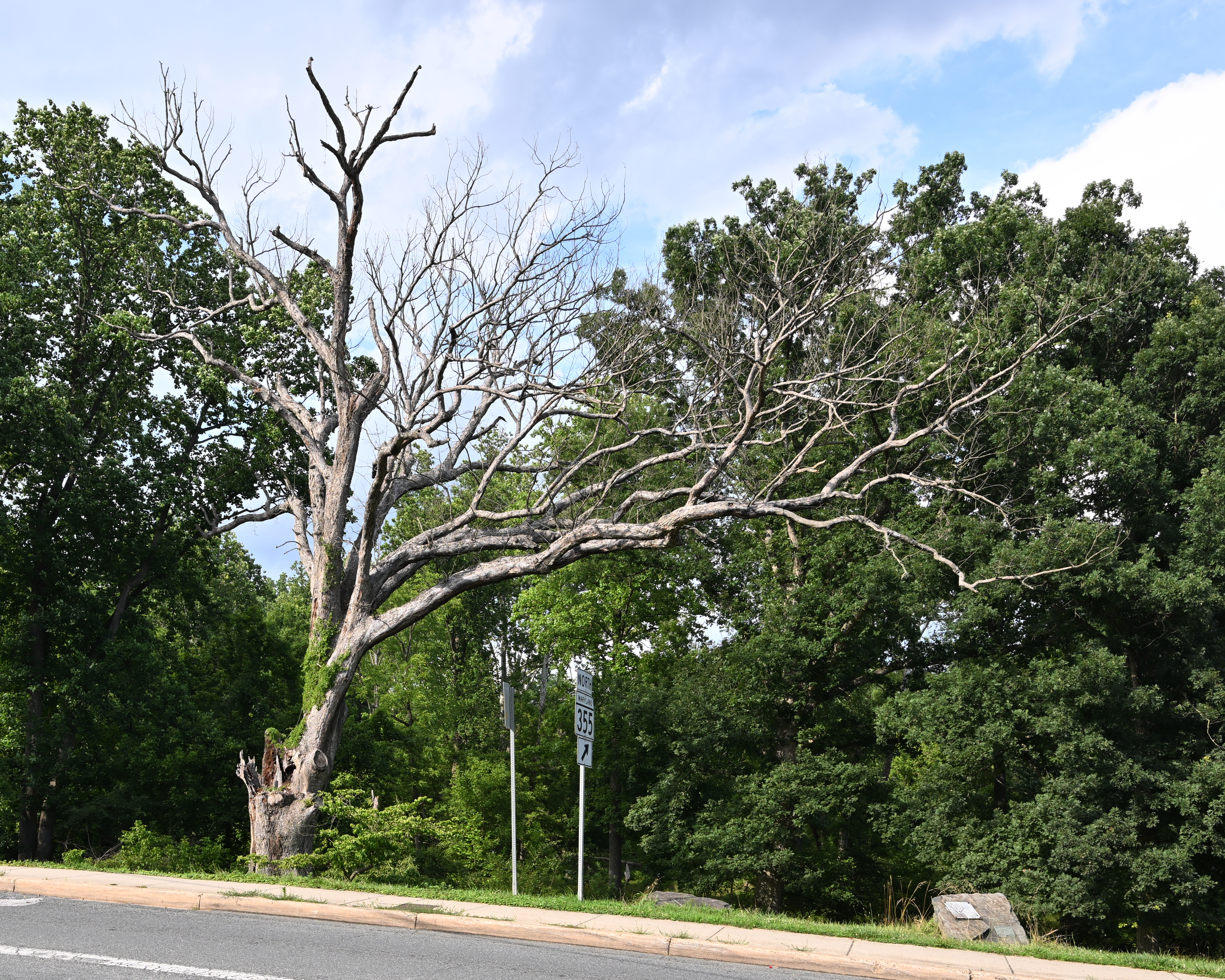
The dead Linden Oak on July 2, 2023, shortly before it was removed

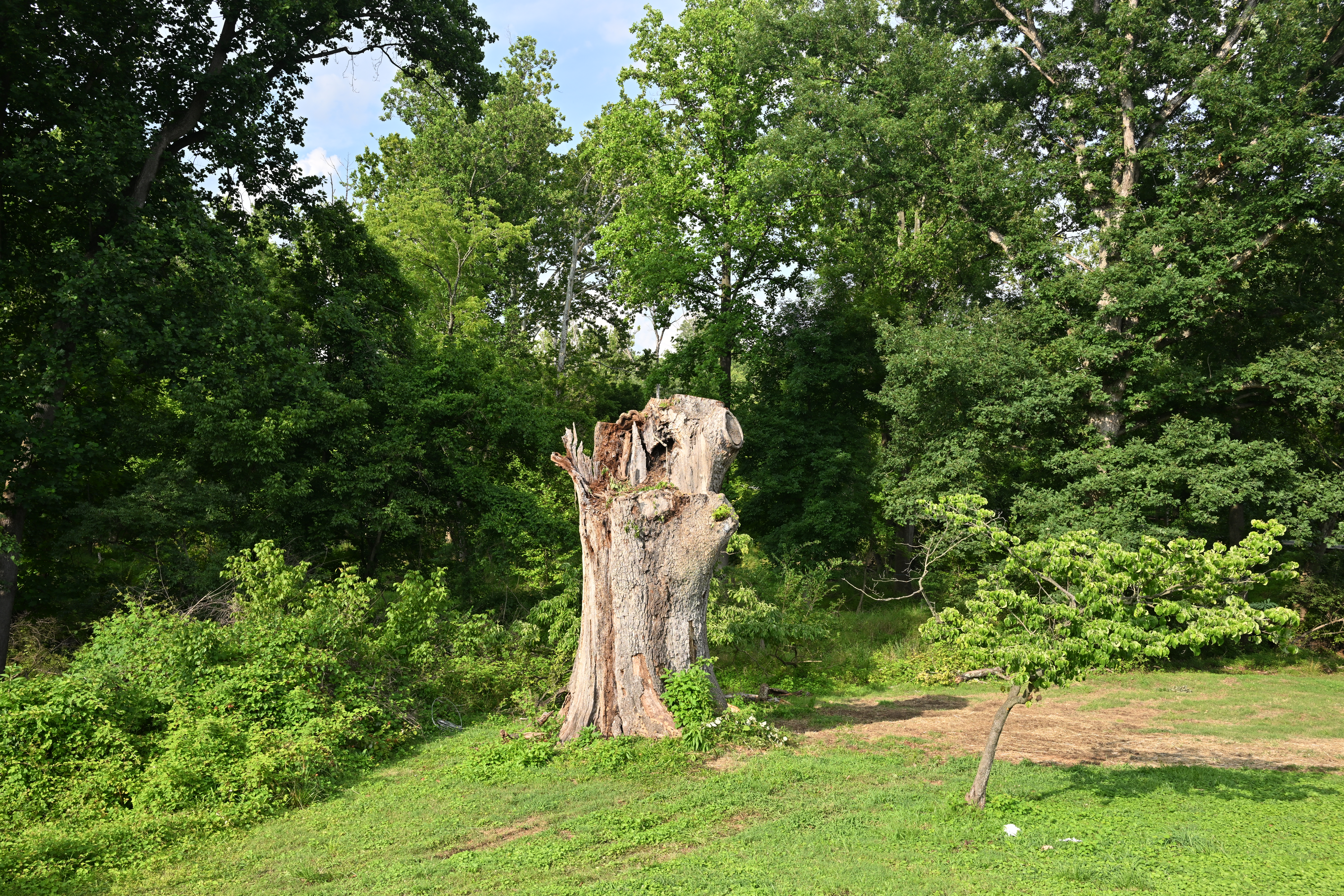
The stump of the Linden Oak on July 19, 2023, after the bulk of the tree was removed

== Plaques ==
The Linden Oak is acknowledged by three on-site plaques.

- The first plaque, placed in July 1976 by the Maryland Bicentennial Commission and the Maryland Forest Service, celebrates the "Maryland Bicentennial Tree" for its great age.
- The second plaque, placed by the Montgomery County Department of Parks (also 1976) celebrates the "Linden Oak" as "the fourth largest of its species in the state of Maryland and the largest in Montgomery County". An age of over 250 years, height of over 95 feet (29 m) and crown spread of over 132 feet (40 m) are cited.
- The third plaque, placed by the Montgomery County Department of Park and Planning (no date), honors Idamae Garrott, a local politician and champion of the environment. Owing to her efforts in 1973, the adjacent stretch of the Washington Metro (Red Line) was built in an arc diverting around the tree to avoid disturbing it.

== See also ==
- Wye Oak, a larger white oak in Wye Mills, Maryland, that was destroyed by high winds in 2002
- Arbutus Oak, another white oak tree in Arbutus, Maryland, that was saved during the construction of Interstate 95
- List of individual trees
