= Three Mile Oak =

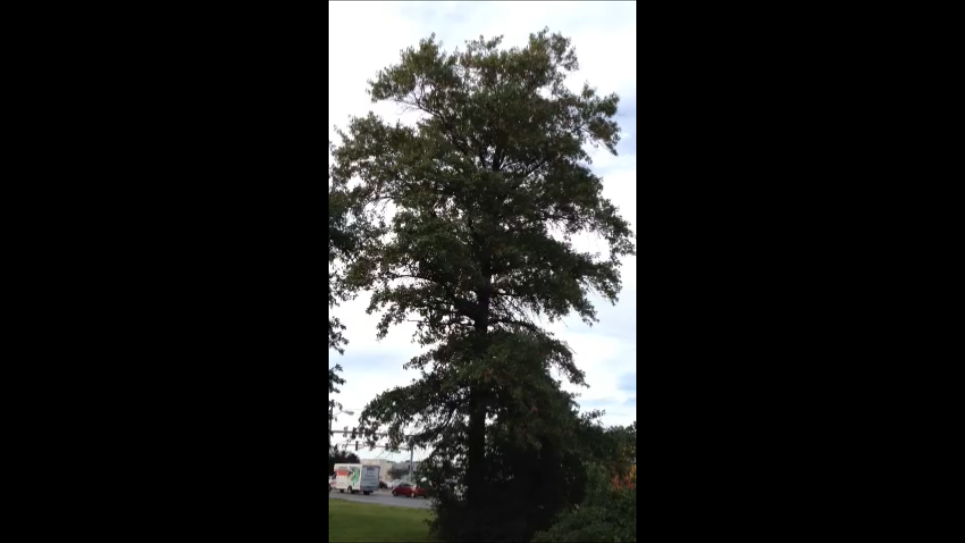
- 1967 Replacement Oak at Three Mile Oak Tree Marker

- Location within Maryland
- 38.986°N 76.547°W

Three Mile Oak got its name because it was three miles from the Maryland State House. Prominent visitors were met at the tree, on the outskirts of Annapolis, and escorted into the city.

== History ==
The Three Mile Oak was last a tree stump from the 18th century. Presumably a white oak, about six feet in diameter, and originally located three miles from Annapolis in Parole, Anne Arundel County. The tree was struck by lightning, became hollow, was killed by fire, and finally blew down on May 22, 1909. At the site where the tree stood, a delegation is reported to have met George Washington en route to Annapolis (then the U.S. capital) to resign his commission on December 19, 1783. Washington resigned as commander-in-chief on December 23.

== Plaque at the original tree site ==
While on display outdoors for many years, the Three Mile Oak was exhibited with a plaque erected in 1967 by the Four Rivers Garden Club, Rotary of Annapolis, explaining its significance. The plaque states:

Under this tree passed General George Washington December 19, 1783 on his way to Annapolis to resign his Commission as Commander-In-Chief of the Continental Armies, and it is thought that General Smallwood accompanied by General Gates and distinguished citizens of Annapolis met General Washington at this spot.

General Lafayette passed here December 17, 1824 to visit the friends of revolutionary days.

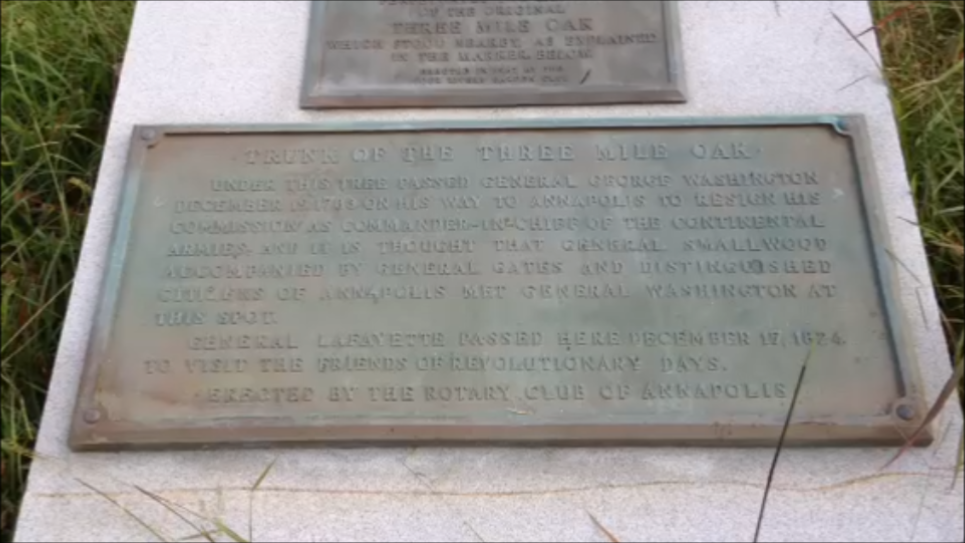
Original plaque

The plaque and tree trunk originally sat at the corner of West Street and Route 178 (Generals Highway).

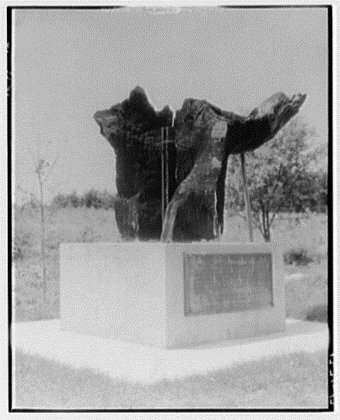
Three Mile Oak stump with rebar through concrete block

The concrete block that held the twisted stump of the tree is still located at that spot, just outside the parking lot of Toys R Us, diagonally from the Applebee's at the Annapolis Mall. The twisted rebars rising out of the concrete block protected the rotting trunk of the tree.

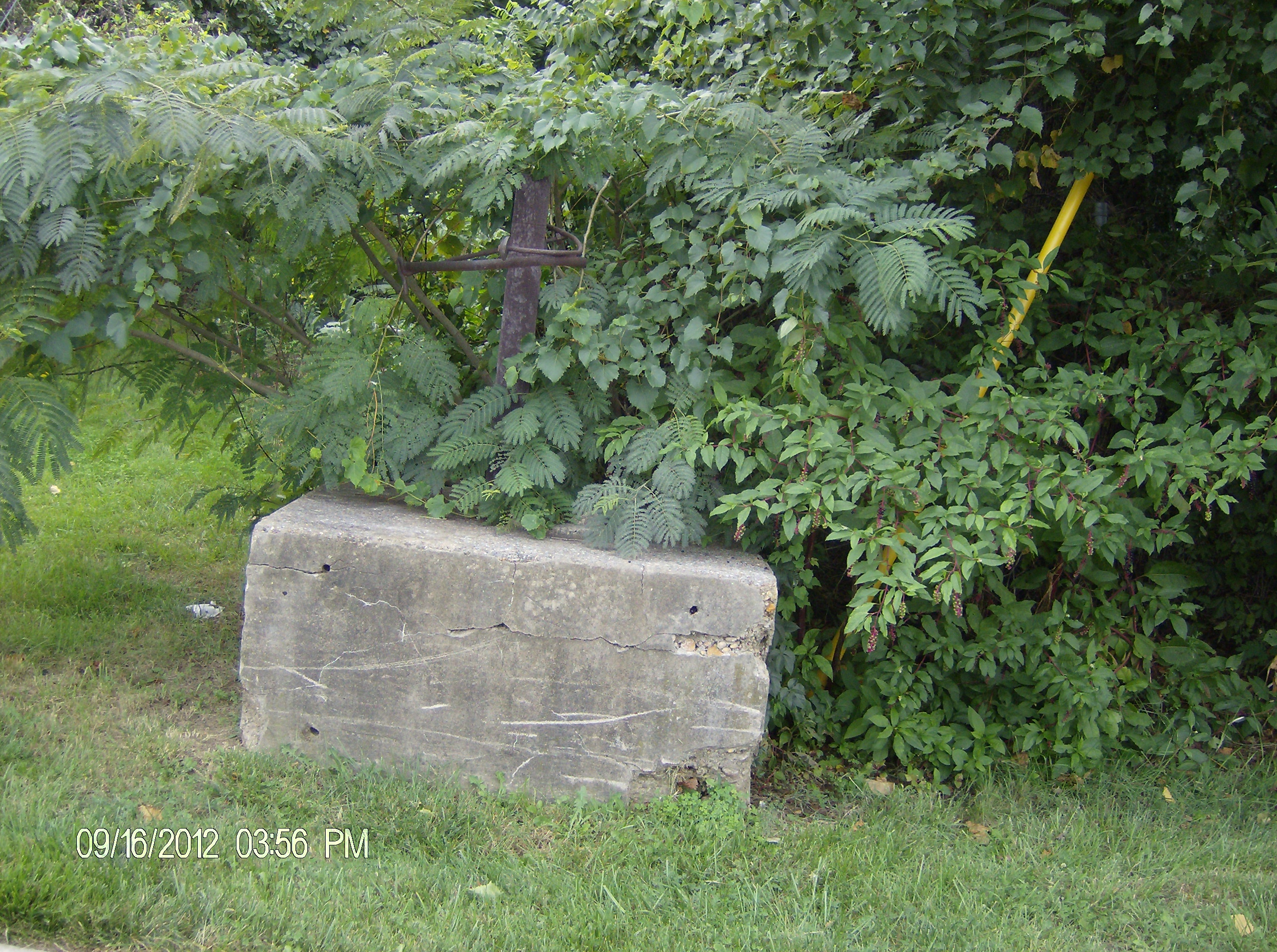
Concrete block that held stump of Three Mile Oak

== Moving the plaque ==
The plaque was moved in 1967 down the road, approximately 500 feet, across from the Red Lobster and the former Famous Dave's Restaurants (now Uncle Julio's). Local citizens feared that it would be destroyed by traffic if left unprotected at the corner of West Street and Defense Highway. A new oak tree was planted close to the relocated plaque. A new plaque was placed over the dismounted and moved original plaque. It reads:

This oak tree planted in 1967 perpetuates the memory of the original Three Mile Oak which stood nearby as explained in the marker below.

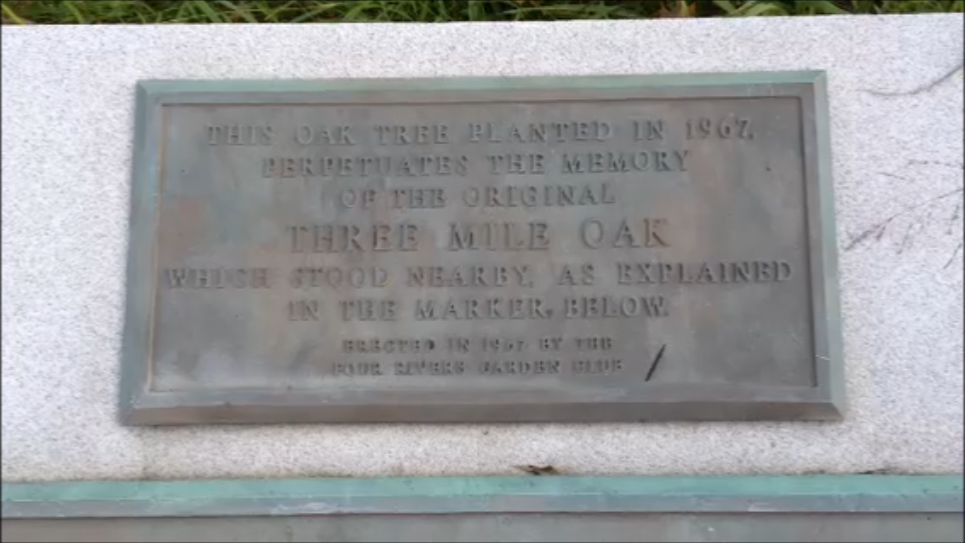
Additional plaque for Three Mile Oak

== See also ==
- List of individual trees
