= Ferdinand Pettrich =

German sculptor

Friedrich August Ferdinand Pettrich
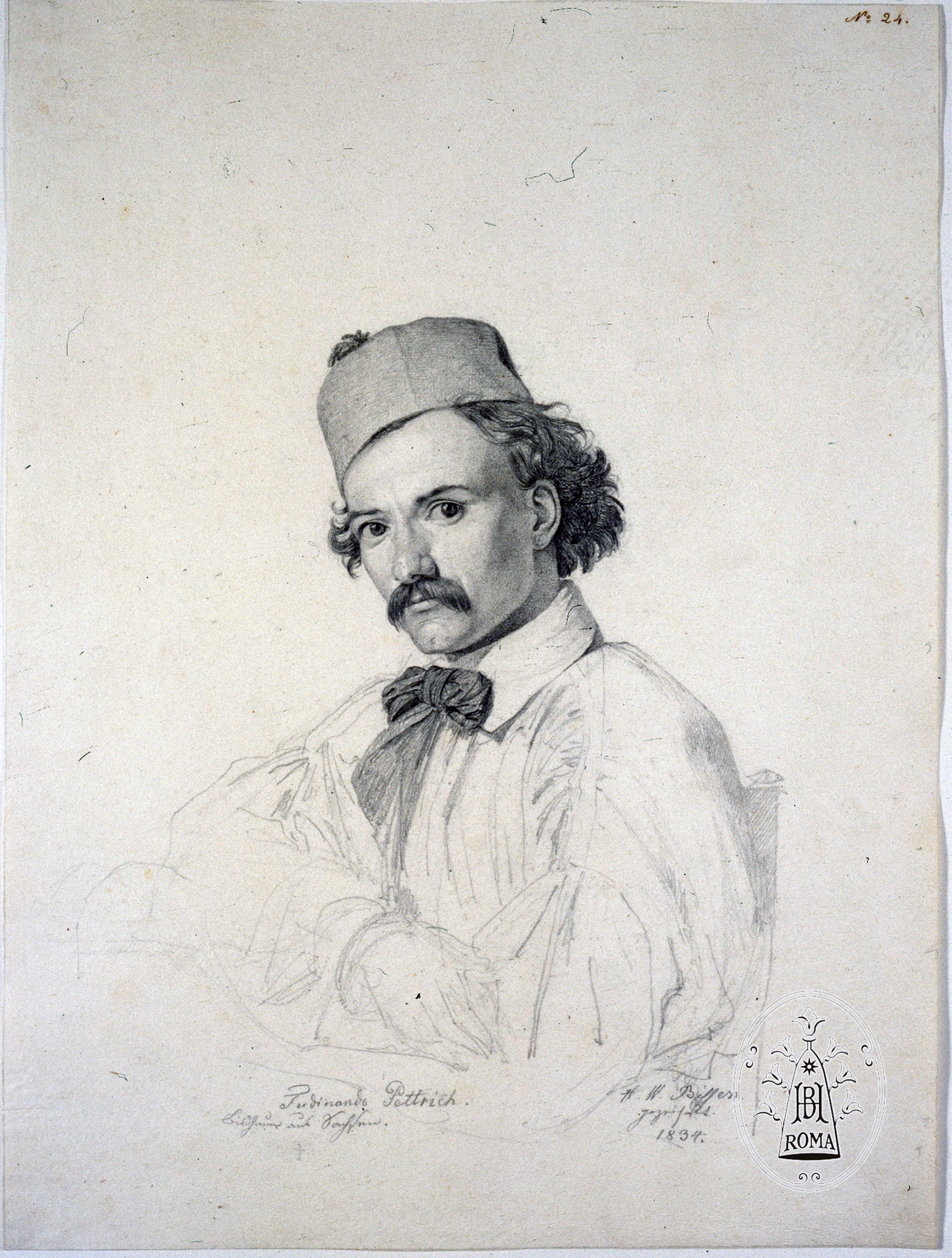
- Portrait of Pettrich by Herman Wilhelm Bissen
- Born: 1798; Dresden, Electorate of Saxony
- Died: February 14, 1872 (aged 73–74); Rome, Kingdom of Italy
- Known for: Sculpture

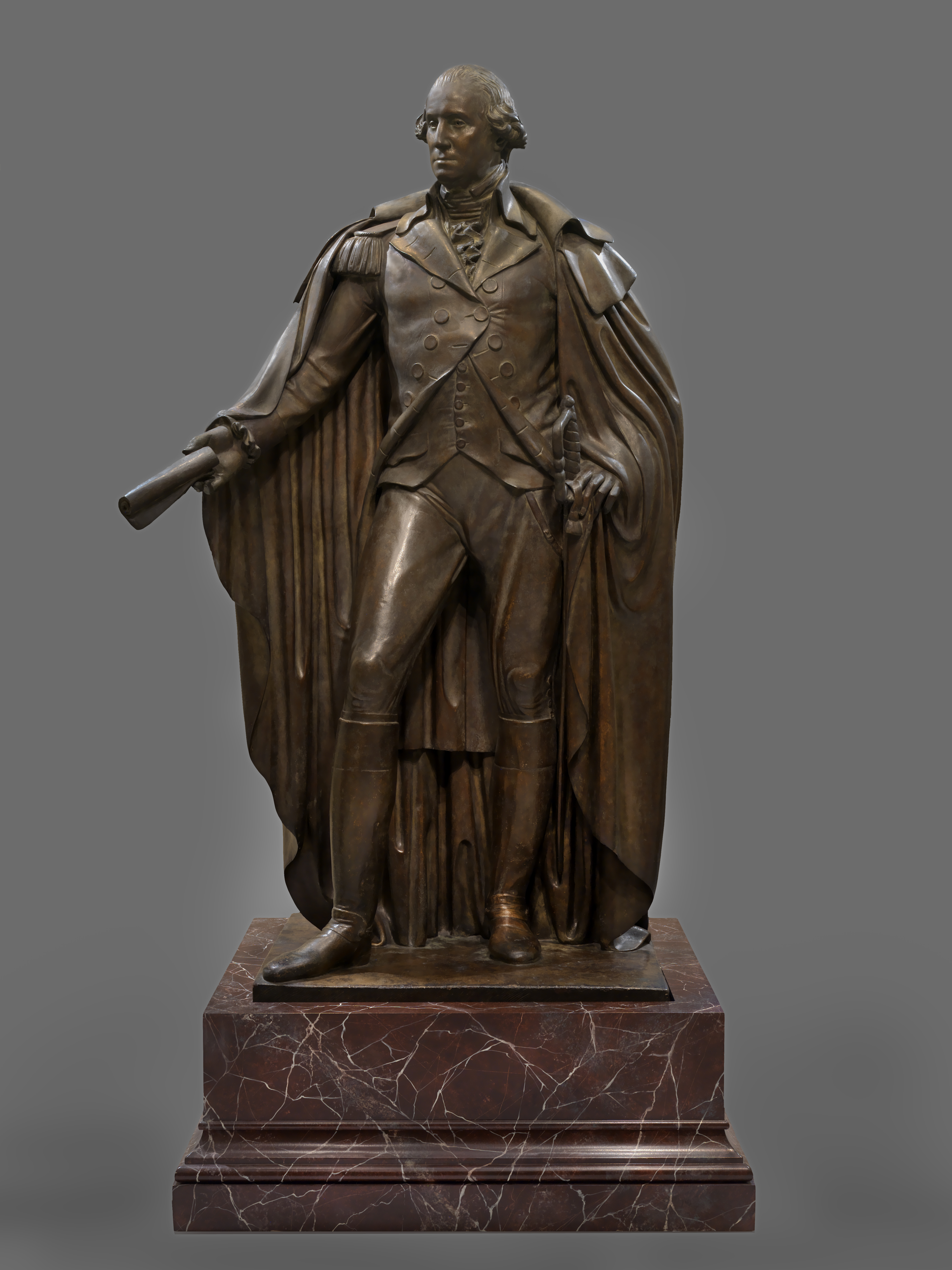
Washington Resigning His Commission, ca. 1841, now at the Smithsonian American Art Museum

Friedrich August Ferdinand Pettrich (1798 – 14 February 1872) was a German sculptor active in Germany, Brazil, the United States, and Italy. He was an internationally famous portrait sculptor who created busts of political figures in Washington D.C. as well as Native Americans such as Tecumseh. In the early 1840s he moved to Brazil to become the Court Sculptor to Emperor Dom Pedro II.

== Life ==
Born in Dresden to sculptor Franz Pettrich, court sculptor to Elector Frederick Augustus III of Saxony, Pettrich studied in Rome under Bertel Thorvaldsen. After achieving fame in Europe, in 1835 Pettrich and his wife moved to the United States, first in Philadelphia, then Washington, D.C. Pettrich died in Rome in 1872.

== Sculptures by Pettrich ==
- The Dying Tecumseh
- Martin Van Buren
- John Vaughan (wine merchant)
- Washington Resigning His Commission
- Mrs. Frederich Augustus Ferdinand Pettrich
- Self-Portrait
- William Norris
- Our Lady of the Confederacy in the Cathedral of Saint John the Baptist (Charleston)

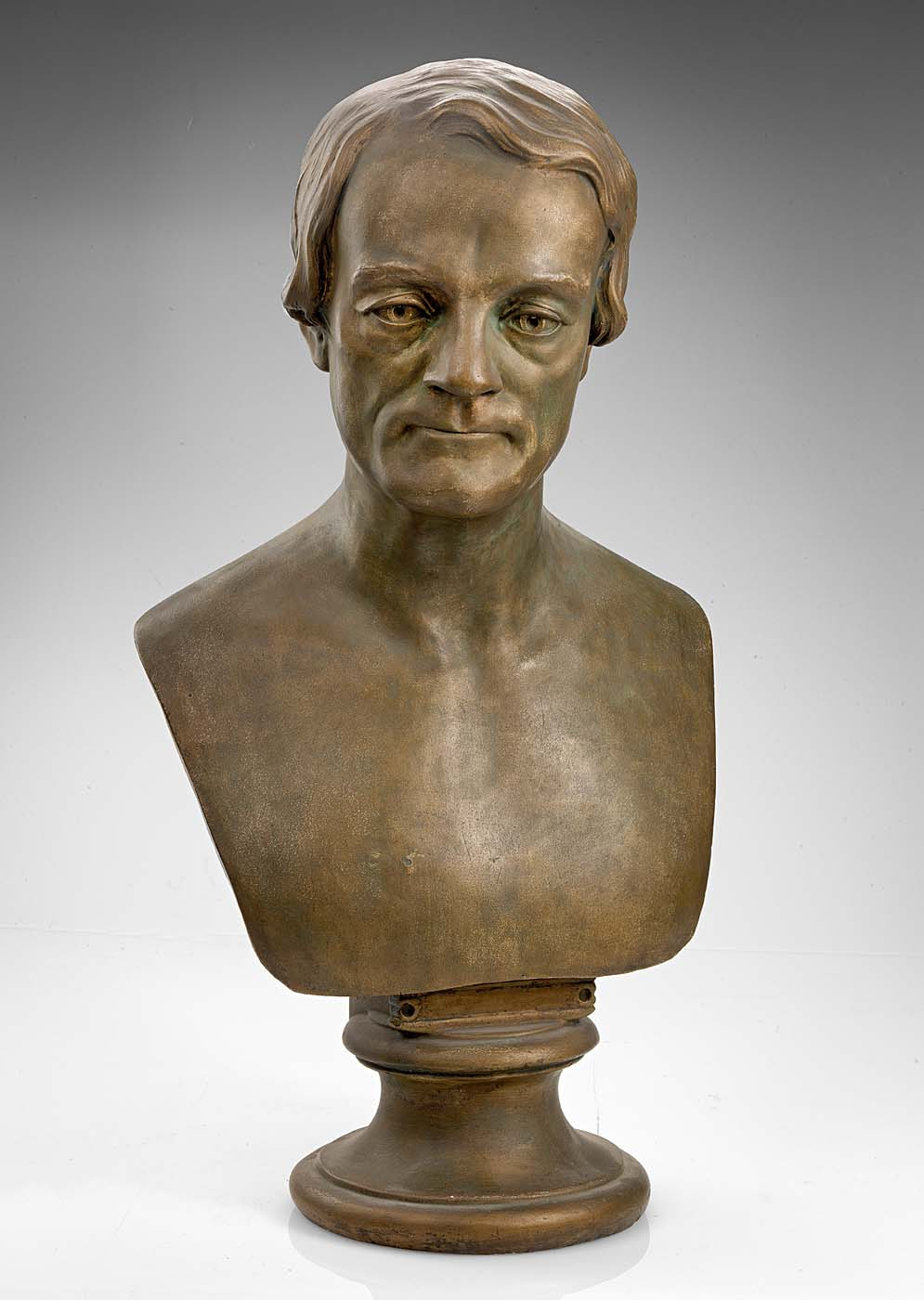

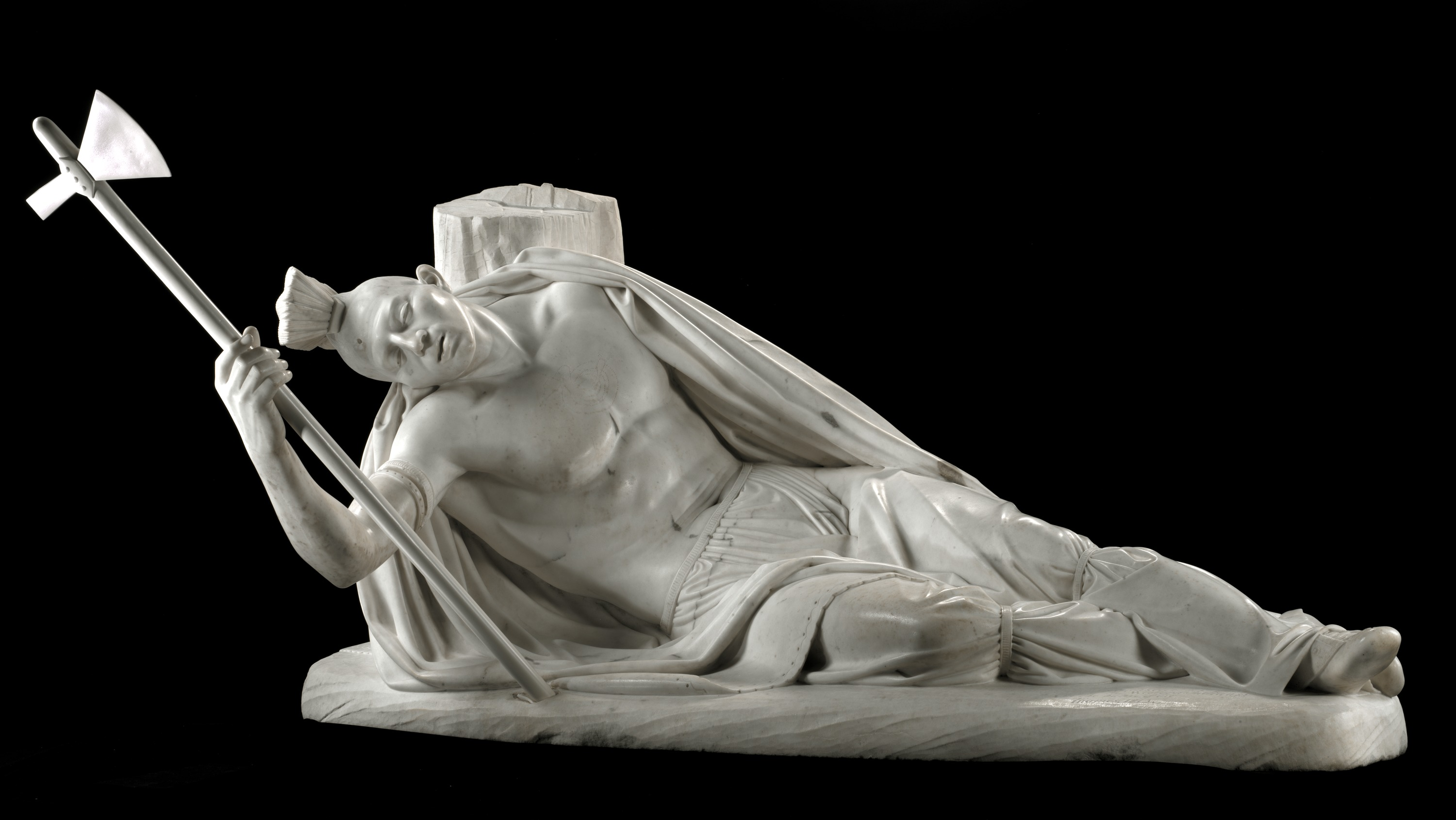
The Dying Tecumseh

== See also ==
- Vatican biography
- vatican-patrons.org page
- Biography page at fada.com
- Biography listing at Smithsonian American Art Museum
- Note in 1892 Corcoran Gallery of Art catalog
