= Arbutus, Maryland =

- Census-designated place (Note: Suburb distinctly different from "Historic Relay" or Halethorpe)
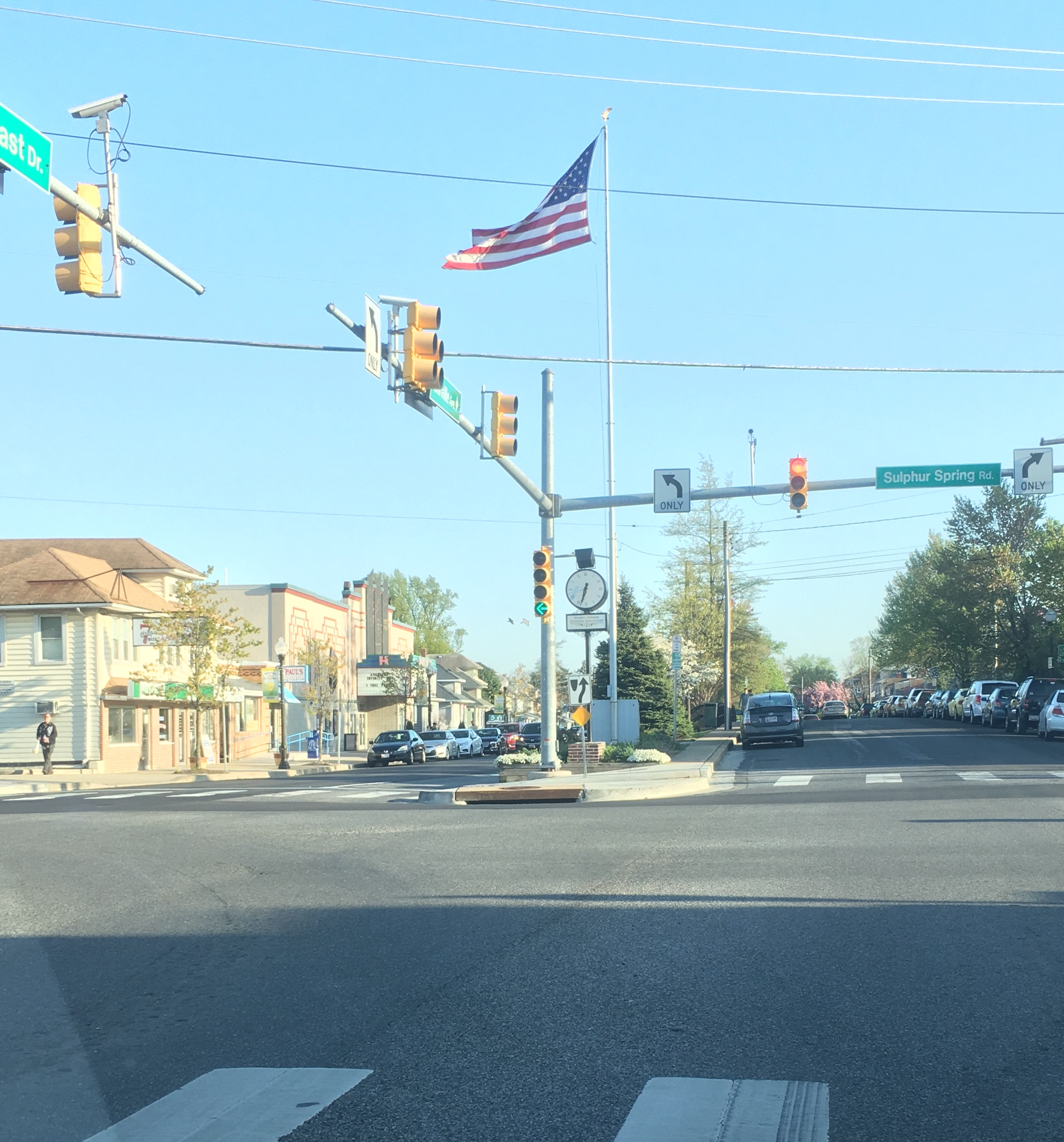
- Downtown Arbutus

- Location of Arbutus, Maryland
- Coordinates: 39°14′40″N 76°41′38″W
- Country: United States
- State: Maryland
- County: Baltimore
- Established: August 18, 1896

Area
  - Total: 6.53 sq mi (16.91 km^{2})
  - Land: 6.53 sq mi (16.90 km^{2})
  - Water: 0 sq mi (0.00 km^{2})
- Elevation: 151 ft (46 m)

Population (2020)
  - Total: 21,655
  - Density: 3,318.3/sq mi (1,281.21/km^{2})
- Time zone: UTC−5 (Eastern (EST))
  - Summer (DST): UTC−4 (EDT)
- ZIP code: 21227
- Area code: 410
- FIPS code: 24-01975
- GNIS feature ID: 0589649

Arbutus is an unincorporated community and a census-designated place in Baltimore County, Maryland, United States. The population was 20,483 at the 2010 census. The census area also contains the communities of Halethorpe and Relay, in which all three names were used during the 1960 census when the area had a population of 22,402.

== Geography ==
Arbutus is located at 39°14′40″N 76°41′38″W (39.244406, −76.693928).

According to the United States Census Bureau, the CDP has a total area of 6.5 square miles (17 km^{2}), all land.

Herbert Run, a stream, runs through Arbutus and surrounding areas which splits, and becomes Herbert Run East and West.

== History ==
The original Relay was an important station on the Baltimore and Ohio Railroad. It was where traffic from Baltimore merged with that from Washington, before continuing west along the railroad's main line towards Wheeling, West Virginia (prior to 1863, Virginia). It was also a key junction for the railroad's telegraph system (the first major system in the country). The Thomas Viaduct is also located in Relay. The bridge is now operated by CSX Transportation, which acquired the B&O in 1987.

== Demographics ==
Historical population
Census	Pop.	Note	%±
1960	22,402		—
1970	22,745		1.5%
1980	20,163		−11.4%
1990	19,750		−2.0%
2000	20,116		1.9%
2010	20,483		1.8%
2020	21,655		5.7%

=== Racial and ethnic composition ===
Arbutus CDP, Maryland – Racial and ethnic composition Note: the US Census treats Hispanic/Latino as an ethnic category. This table excludes Latinos from the racial categories and assigns them to a separate category. Hispanics/Latinos may be of any race.
Race / Ethnicity (NH = Non-Hispanic)	Pop 2000	Pop 2010	Pop 2020	% 2000	% 2010	% 2020
White alone (NH)	16,978	15,685	13,657	84.40%	76.58%	63.07%
Black or African American alone (NH)	1,243	1,946	2,569	6.18%	9.50%	11.86%
Native American or Alaska Native alone (NH)	54	36	40	0.27%	0.18%	0.18%
Asian alone (NH)	1,225	1,764	3,093	6.09%	8.61%	14.28%
Native Hawaiian or Pacific Islander alone (NH)	2	16	1	0.01%	0.08%	0.00%
Other race alone (NH)	14	44	85	0.07%	0.21%	0.39%
Mixed race or Multiracial (NH)	292	394	1,153	1.45%	1.92%	5.32%
Hispanic or Latino (any race)	308	598	1,057	1.53%	2.92%	4.88%
Total	20,116	20,483	21,655	100.00%	100.00%	100.00%

=== 2020 census ===
As of the 2020 census, Arbutus had a population of 21,655. The median age was 35.4 years. 21.6% of residents were under the age of 18 and 12.9% of residents were 65 years of age or older. For every 100 females there were 99.8 males, and for every 100 females age 18 and over there were 98.9 males age 18 and over.

99.4% of residents lived in urban areas, while 0.6% lived in rural areas.

There were 8,269 households in Arbutus, of which 30.2% had children under the age of 18 living in them. Of all households, 43.1% were married-couple households, 21.8% were households with a male householder and no spouse or partner present, and 27.0% were households with a female householder and no spouse or partner present. About 26.6% of all households were made up of individuals and 9.0% had someone living alone who was 65 years of age or older.

There were 8,793 housing units, of which 6.0% were vacant. The homeowner vacancy rate was 1.4% and the rental vacancy rate was 8.3%.

=== 2010 census ===
As of the 2010 census Arbutus had a population of 20,483. The racial and ethnic composition of the population was 76.6% non-Hispanic white, 9.5% non-Hispanic black, 0.2% Native American, 2.1% Asian Indian, 6.5% other Asian, 0.1% Pacific Islander, 0.2% non-Hispanic from some other race, 2.3% from two or more races and 2.9% Hispanic or Latino of any race.

=== 2000 census ===
As of the census of 2000, there were 20,116 people, 8,120 households, and 5,204 families residing in the CDP. The population density was 3,093.8 inhabitants per square mile (1,194.5/km^{2}). There were 8,380 housing units at an average density of 1,288.8 per square mile (497.6/km^{2}). The racial makeup of the CDP was 85.21% White, 6.27% African American, 0.28% Native American, 6.10% Asian, 0.02% Pacific Islander, 0.48% from other races, and 1.63% from two or more races. Hispanic or Latino of any race were 1.53% of the population.

There were 8,120 households, out of which 28.0% had children under the age of 18 living with them, 48.6% were married couples living together, 11.0% had a female householder with no husband present, and 35.9% were non-families. 27.6% of all households were made up of individuals, and 9.6% had someone living alone who was 65 years of age or older. The average household size was 2.44 and the average family size was 2.99.

In the CDP, the population was spread out, with 22.2% under the age of 18, 8.5% from 18 to 24, 33.5% from 25 to 44, 21.3% from 45 to 64, and 14.4% who were 65 years of age or older. The median age was 37 years. For every 100 females, there were 93.8 males. For every 100 females age 18 and over, there were 91.2 males.

The median income for a household in the CDP was $47,792, and the median income for a family was $54,003. Males had a median income of $37,766 versus $29,129 for females. The per capita income for the CDP was $22,456. About 4.5% of families and 6.8% of the population were below the poverty line, including 6.5% of those under age 18 and 6.1% of those age 65 or over.

== Emergency services ==
Fire and emergency medical services are provided by the Arbutus Volunteer Fire Department Baltimore County Station 35, as well as Halethorpe's Baltimore County Station 5. These stations provide fire protection, heavy rescue, swift water rescue, and paramedic-level emergency medical services to the citizens of Arbutus and the surrounding communities. Mutual aid is provided by the surrounding Baltimore County stations as well as the Baltimore City and Howard County fire departments.

Police protection is provided mainly by the Baltimore County Police Department, Wilkens Precinct. Additional police service is provided by the Baltimore County Sheriff's Office, UMBC Police, Maryland State Police, and the Maryland Transportation Authority Police.

== Education ==
Colleges and universities:

- University of Maryland, Baltimore County (UMBC) is located adjacent to Arbutus and the neighboring unincorporated municipality of Catonsville.

Primary and secondary schools are operated by Baltimore County Public Schools.

== Notable attractions ==
- Arbutus Oak, a large white oak tree east of Arbutus in the middle of the I-95/I-695 interchange
- Conservation and Environmental Research Areas of UMBC, a research forest park utilized by the University of Maryland, Baltimore County
- Guinness Open Gate Brewery, the first Guinness brewery opened in the United States in the historic Calvert Distillery
- Patapsco Valley State Park, a large state park along the Patapsco River
- Relay, a historic neighborhood south of Arbutus with examples of Victorian architecture
- Thomas Viaduct, a railroad bridge over the Patapsco River that was listed on the National Register of Historic Places in 1966.

== Notable people ==
- David Byrne, lead singer of Talking Heads
- Robert Ehrlich, 60th Governor of Maryland, U.S. Congressman
- Duane A. Gamble, retired United States Army general
- Wild Bill Hagy, well-known Baltimore Orioles fan
