= Alumnae Hall (Western College for Women) =

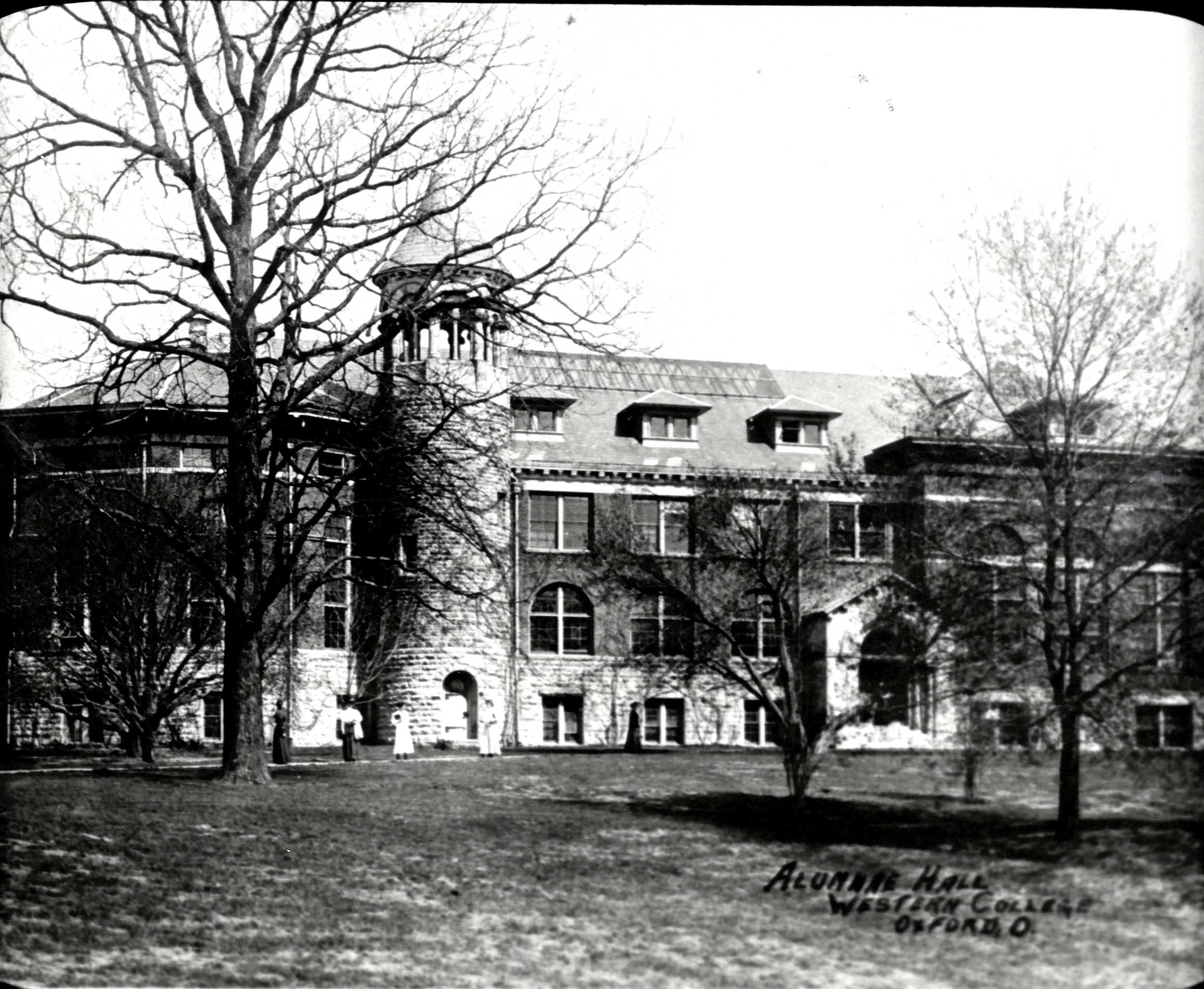
- Alumnae Hall

- Location within Ohio

General information
- Architectural style: Romanesque Revival
- Location: Oxford, Ohio, United States
- Coordinates: 39°30′7.80″N 84°43′32.38″W
- Elevation: 2 m (7 ft)
- Construction started: 1890
- Completed: 1892
- Inaugurated: 9 June 1892
- Demolished: 1977
- Cost: $50,000 USD

Alumnae Hall was the second building to be built on The Western Female Seminary's campus, and was completed in 1892. The building was constructed from funds donated by Olivia Meily Brice (Mrs. Calvin S. Brice), class of 1866, and other alumnae, trustees, and friends of the college. The architecture style of the building was Romanesque Revival. The building remained in use as a library until 1970 when Hoyt Hall opened. Between 1972-1974 it was used as a student center. It was torn down in 1977.

== History ==
The building originally housed a library, classrooms, laboratories, and offices for the departments of English, classics, history, political and social sciences, philosophy, religion, and art. On the second floor Alumnae Hall there was an art gallery that would contain either the college's collections, or a traveling art exhibition.

The library once held 49,000 volumes, and the public was invited to use and visit the library. They worked under an open-shelf system, which means that most of the library's collection is open and freely accessible. The books were housed in fire-resistant rooms.

Sometime after 1871 (the year Peabody Hall was built) there was a report submitted looking for financial assistance for various buildings on Western College's campus. The report stated that Alumnae Hall no longer has sufficient laboratory equipment, or the space for new equipment. There was also a call for an increase in the library volumes, and construction of new reading and book reserve rooms. Because at the time an addition was being considered for Peabody Hall, it was proposed to move both the laboratory and library facilities from Alumnae to Peabody with Peabody's next extension.

Alumnae Hall housed the Western library collection up until 1970 - the year Hoyt Hall was built. After that the library was relocated to Hoyt Hall. On April 7, 1972, Alumnae Hall reopened with the library quarters repurposed as a student community center. There were regular performances from students, and various games would be played within the hall.

The building's purpose was called into question in 1974 when Miami University turned it over to the Miami graduate students in art. There had been a controversy over what to do with the building because it had only housed the Rathskeller (also known as a Ratskeller), a snack bar in the basement of the building.

Within the next year that Alumnae Hall was scheduled to be razed in June 1975. However, Professor Richard McCommons gave a presentation to President Phillip Shriver, and was able to get a temporary reprieve on the building so he could conduct a study to investigate the architecture and determine if it was worth saving based on structural and economical liabilities. Ultimately after this last postponement, Miami's Board of Trustees instructed the administration to arrange for Alumnae Hall's demolition.

Alumnae Hall was torn down in 1977.

== Alumnae Hall Memorial ==
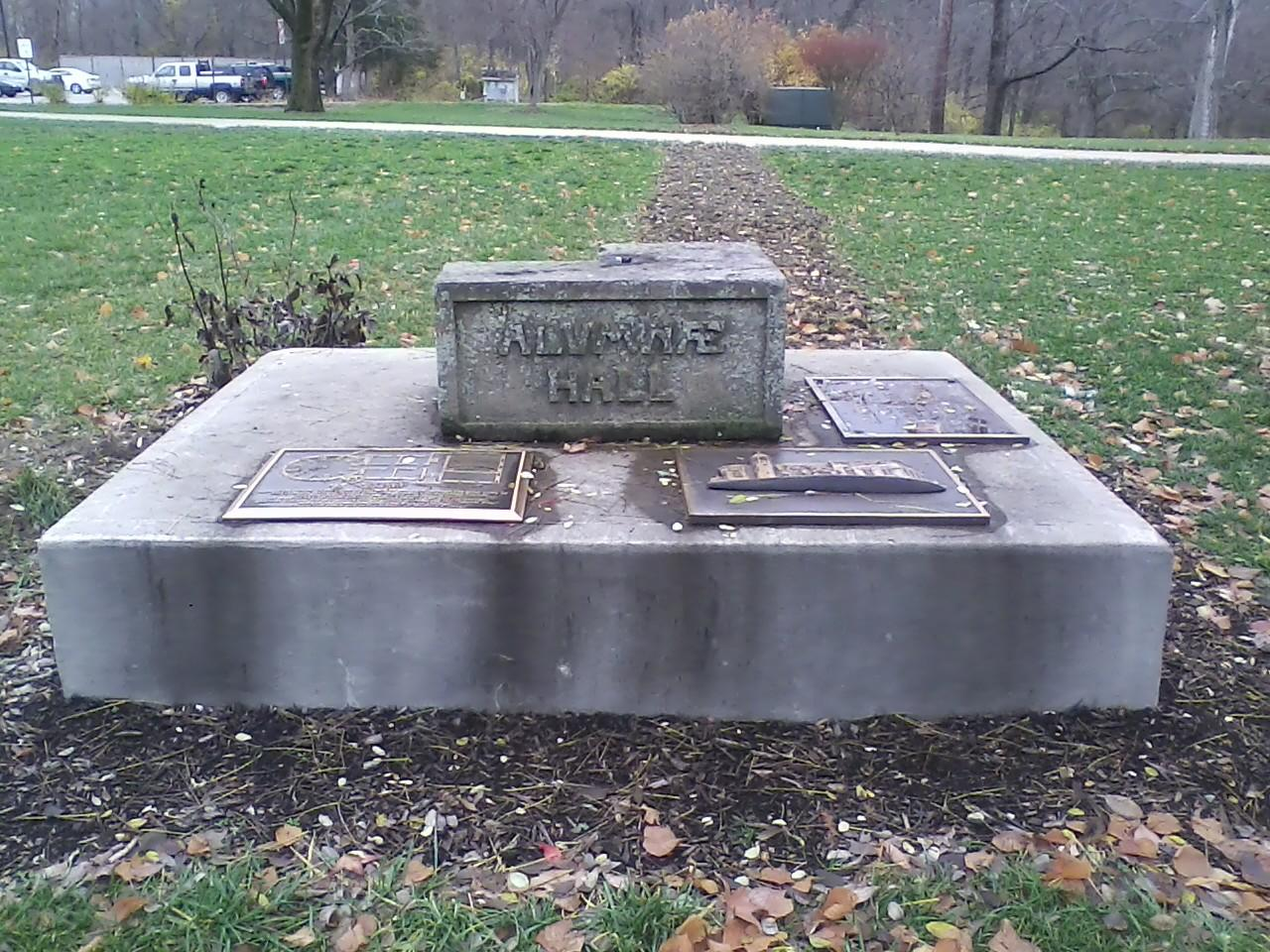
Alumnae Hall Memorial

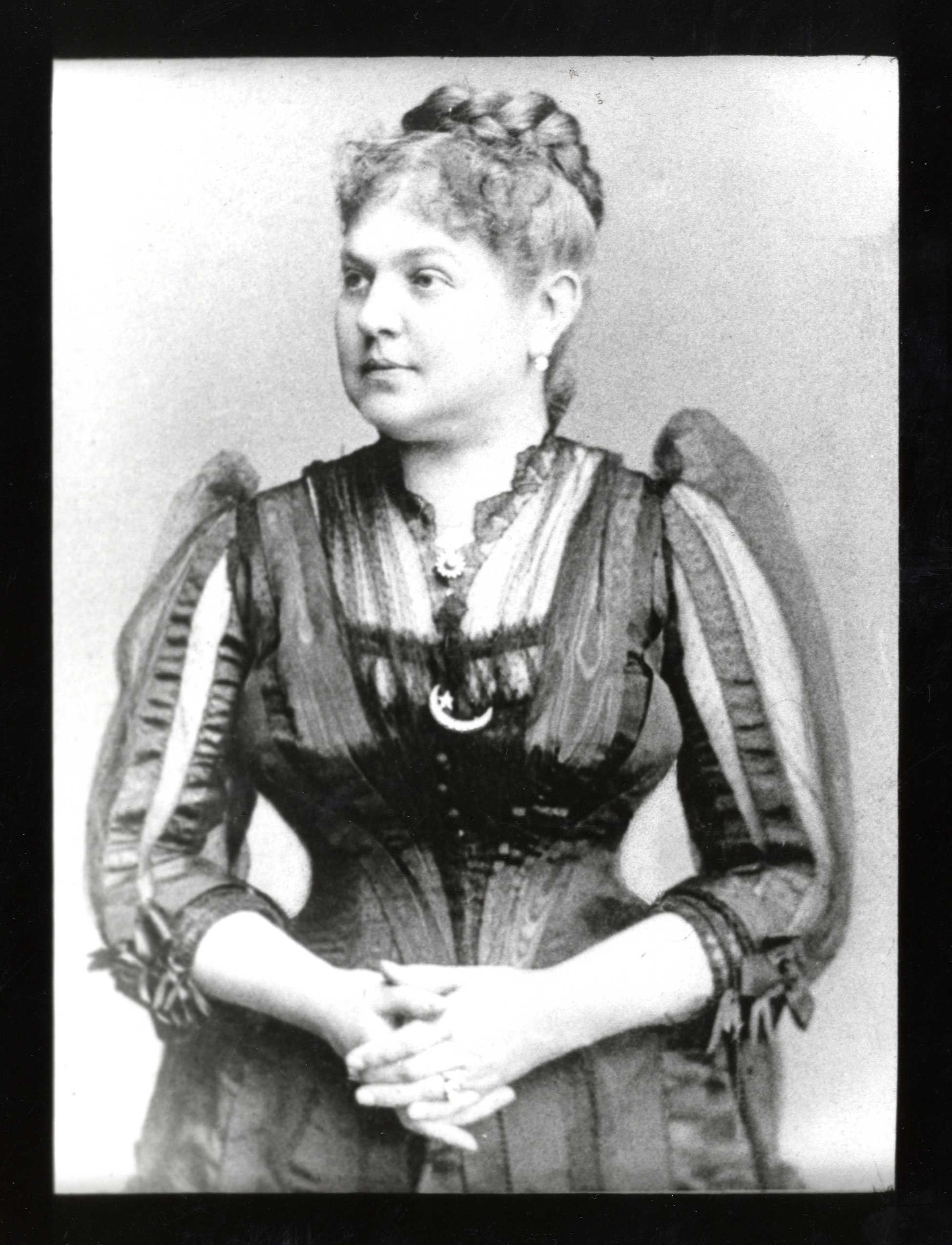
Olivia Meily Brice (Mrs. Calvin S. Brice) (Western Memorial Archive).

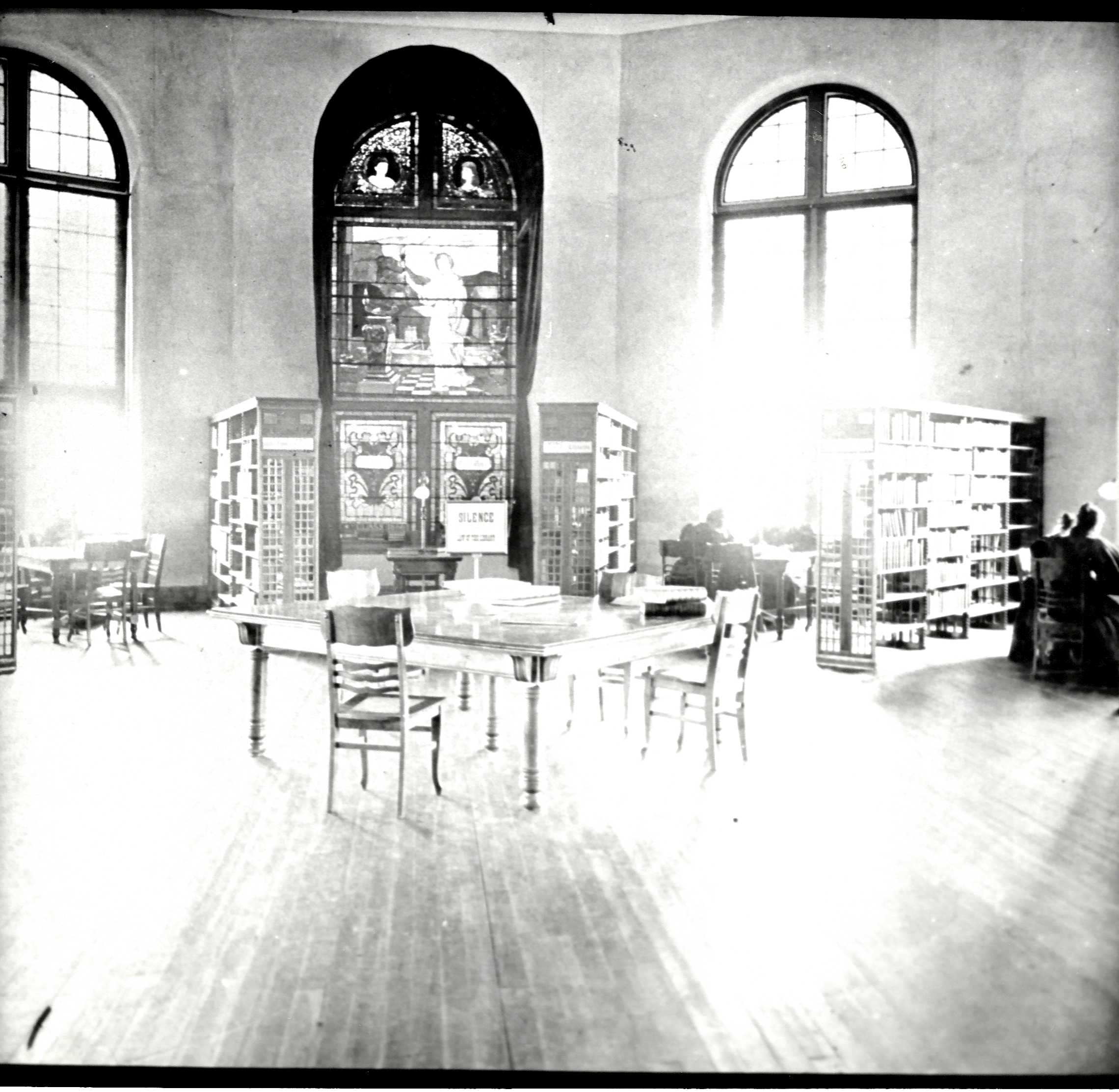
Brice Window (Tillinghast Window) in Alumnae Library (Western Memorial Archive).

Since the demolition of Alumnae Hall, there is now a memorial stone – the building's corner stone - in its place. The stone contains the building's erection date, its dedication plaque, an overhead building plan, and an image of the front of the building.

Every year the outline of the building is dug up by alumnae and current students, and they plant flowers so in the spring they will bloom in the shape of the former hall.

== Olivia Meily Brice (Mrs. Calvin S. Brice) ==
Olivia Meily Brice was an alumna of the Western College for Women, class of 1866. She became the first female trustee of the Western Female Seminary, and served as the President of the Alumnae Association. During her time as a trustee, she donated first $5,000 toward a fund of $50,000 being raised for a new library and laboratory building, which became Alumnae Hall. She also presented the gift of a memorial window (called either the Brice Window or the Tillinghast Window) from her class of 1866.

On Alumnae Hall's dedication plaque she is the only one mentioned by name, with “other assorted alumnae” written beneath.

== The Brice Window (Tillinghast Window) ==
Alumnae Hall housed a stained-glass art piece, The Tillinghas Window (or The Brice Window) that was a gift from the class of 1866. Artist Mary Elizabeth Tillinghast created the window. Its original design was for Alumnae Hall, and placed in the north end of the library.

The window's central figure is a young woman standing beside an altar with a lightened and uplifted torch in her hand. She was meant to symbolize the new type of inspired and independent womanhood as well as to illustrate the motto of the class of 1866 suggesting that success is achieved at the prices of hard work, “Per Aspera, Ad Astra.” The motto was inscribed at the bottom of the window along with “The Eleven…1866” – standing for the eleven members of the Seminary's eleventh class. The main figure's face is modeled after Oliva Meily Brice's daughter – Miss Helen Brice. Above the figure of the girl are two medallions, set in branches. In each medallion there is a young girl's head – portraits of Miss Carpenter, and Miss Porters. Both were daughters of the graduates of the 1866 class. Beneath one medallion “Clio” is written, and beneath the other there is “Urania.”

The Brice Window was Mary Tillinghast's most important commission. The window was displayed at the Chicago's Columbian Exposition in 1893. She sent workmen from New York to remove the window from its place in Alumnae Hall and to crate and ship it to Chicago, where it was displayed and awarded a gold medal for “beauty of its design, inspiration of theme, and exaltation of womanhood.”

After the Exposition, the window was returned to Alumnae Hall, where it stayed until 1933 when it was once again taken to Chicago, this time for the World's Fair. On its return, it was damaged in transit, and stored in the basement of Kumler Chapel until 1974, when the crates were moved to Patterson Place. The window was restored in 1980 and installed in the chapel alcove of Kumler Chapel.

== Heath Chime of Eleven Bells ==
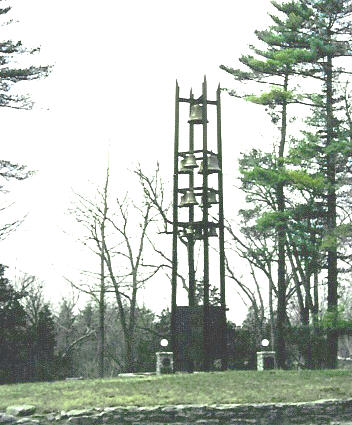
The Molyneaux-Western Bell Tower (Miami University).

On the west side of Alumnae Hall, a tower was built that contained the Heath Chime of eleven bells - the weight of the bells ranging from 130 to 2,000 pounds. The bells were a gift from Mrs. Fletcher S. Heath, of Oxford, in 1925. Mrs. Heath was a Western Trustee from 1925 to 1926. The bells would play daily before morning chapel, and at different times during the year before special events. The bells were housed in the Alumnae Tower until Alumnae Hall's razing in 1977.

When Alumnae Hall was scheduled to be torn down, there was a Chime Committee appointed, and they met with the board of trustees to investigate the possibility of building an open-faced tower to house the Heath Chime. On October 21, 1977, it was voted to proceed with the construction of a steel tower on Western Campus.

This new tower is now known as the Molyneaux-Western Bell Tower, and it is situated on Peabody Green, opposite Peabody Hall. The tower was built in 1978 with a $25,000 grant from the Molyneaux Corporation, along with gifts from Western alumnus. The tower was dedicated on June 18, 1978. The dedication was presided over by Dr. Walter E. Havighurst, along with the then Miami President Dr. Phillip R. Shriver.

The tower is named after Dr. John Molyneaux. He attended Miami from 1893–95. He was a member of the Western College Board of Trustees from 1914 until his death in 1953, and briefly served as Western's acting president in 1941.

The tower is 53 feet tall, and houses the 11-bell Heath Chime, as well as three additional bells that were added in 1978 and cast in the Netherlands by the I.T. Verdin Company of Cincinnati – the company that designed the Molyneaux-Western Bell Tower.

Each bell of the Molyneaux-Western Bell Tower has a different inscription:

- First Bell: "This chime of eleven bells is given to The Western College for Women by Elizabeth McCullough Heath, a member of the Class of 1884, and is dedicated to the glory of God through the development of Christian women."
- Second Bell: "Let knowledge grow from more to more, but more of reverence in us dwell; that mind and soul, according well, may make one music as before."
- Third Bell: "Ring out the false, ring in the true."
- Fourth Bell: "Ring out the feud of rich and poor, ring in redress to all mankind."
- Fifth Bell: "Ring in the nobler modes of life, with sweeter manners, purer laws."
- Sixth Bell: "Ring out the old, ring in the new."
- Seventh Bell: "Ring in the love of truth and right, ring in the common love of God."
- Eighth Bell: "Ring out the thousand wars of old, ring in the thousand years of peace."
- Ninth Bell: "Ring in the valiant man and free, the larger heart, the kindlier hand."
- Tenth Bell: "Ring out the darkness of the land, ring in the Christ that is to be."
- Eleventh Bell: "One God, one law, one element, and one far-off divine event, to which the whole Creation moves."
- Twelfth Bell: "Ring out the winds of remembering."
- Thirteenth Bell: "Bells of the past, whose long forgotten music still finds the wide expanse."
- Fourteenth Bell: "Bells that sing heaven's praise with such an earthly tongue."
