= Langstroth Cottage =

Historic house in Ohio, United States

- U.S. National Register of Historic Places
- U.S. National Historic Landmark
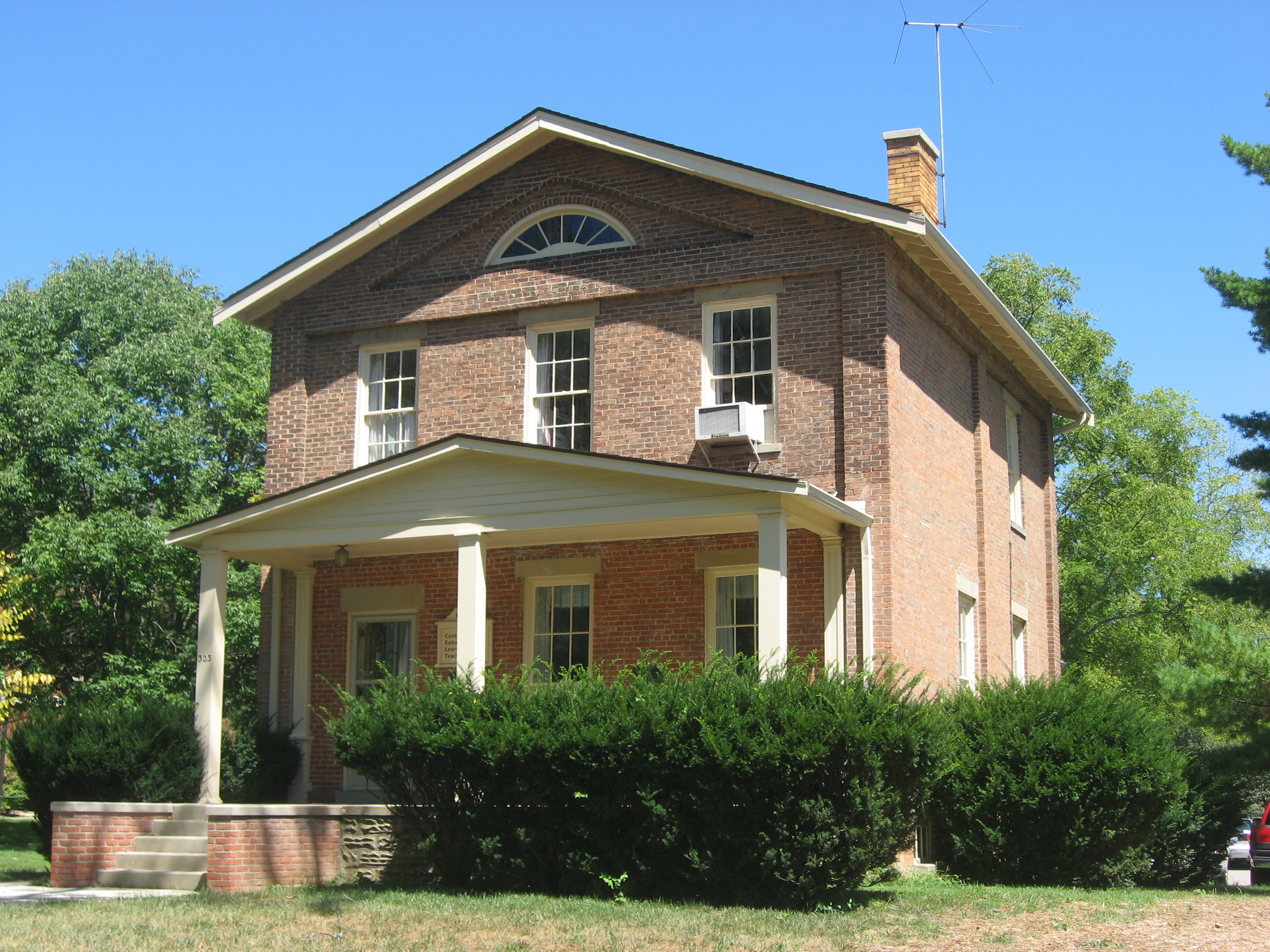
- Front and side of Langstroth Cottage

- Location within Ohio Location within the United States
- Location: 303 Patterson Avenue, Oxford, Ohio
- Coordinates: 39°30′23″N 84°43′49″W
- Area: 0 acres (0 ha)
- Built: 1858
- Architectural style: Greek Revival
- NRHP reference No.: 76001378

Significant dates
- Added to NRHP: June 22, 1976
- Designated NHL: December 21, 1981

Langstroth Cottage is a historic building on the Western College campus of Miami University in Oxford, Ohio. It was designated a National Historic Landmark on June 22, 1976. The cottage, built in 1856, is now the home for the Oxford office of the Butler County Regional Transit Authority. It was purchased for Beekeeper L. L. Langstroth in 1859, and he lived there for the next 28 years, conducting research and breeding honey bees.

== Construction and planning ==
Langstroth Cottage was built in the mid-1850s by Reverend Edward Root. It was purchased for Lorenzo Langstroth by a brother-in-law in 1859, where he then raised his family and continued his love for bees. The cottage is currently the oldest building of the Western College. After Langstroth left the house, the cottage was purchased by Susan Peabody, Helen's niece, who donated it to the Western College. Located on Western Campus, the cottage is adjacent to Patterson Avenue and State Route 27, the cottage is a prime marker to Miami University.

The architecture within presents Greek Revival influence dating back to 1856. The cottage has undergone newer changes in order to keep updated and established. New oak floors and modern plumbing and heating have been installed. The wooden floors of the basement have been replaced by concrete, and the fireplace is closed; fortunately, the outer walls of the house have gone unaffected. The façade is unique with brick pilasters that support the pediment, creating a dug in panel frame. Each corner of the house is emphasized by brick while the side walls have the same paneled effect as the front, and the side panels are divided through the center through a third pilaster. This unique architectural feature is both aesthetic and economical and is rare sight in the town of Oxford. Over the door is a semi-elliptical fanlight. Rooms inside the cottage are fairly plain, but still exude a comfortable atmosphere. Originally, there were four fireplaces in the house but all remain closed today. Around the house, Langstroth planted apple and American Linden trees to help acquire his bees. Langstroth also planted a formal garden, almost an acre long to help bring in bees.

== History ==
The cottage has been used for many functions, ranging from an academic building to a faculty residence. Langstroth Cottage was used for many programs of Miami University, including the Miami University International Office and the Miami University Luxembourg Program Office. Currently, the cottage is temporarily used for office and operations space for the Butler County Regional Transit Authority's Miami University public transit operation.

== Lorenzo Lorraine Langstroth ==
Lorenzo Langstroth grew up in Philadelphia, Pennsylvania, and was the second oldest of eight children. He also attended Yale College, where he found religion, and eventually entered the Yale Divinity School to study for the ministry, where he eventually became Oxford's Presbyterian minister. After finding his love of bees, he married Anne Tucker and they started a family. Unfortunately, Langstroth developed a nervous disorder, which eventually led him to sell his bees. Upon returning to Massachusetts to work on his health, Langstroth started writing his manual Langstroth on the Honeybee. Langstroth was said to have been seasonally depressed and would go months without speaking. His depression only worsened after his wife died which then he would only show love and emotion towards his honeybees. In the last years of his life, he lived with his daughter and her family in Dayton, Ohio. While attending church, Langstroth started preaching and as he said "I wish to talk to you this morning about the love of God," he collapsed and died; Langstroth is buried in the Woodlawn Cemetery in Dayton, Ohio with his gravestone marking "The Father of American Beekeeping".

Sonnet – To Langstroth (Inventor of the Moveable Frame which permitted Beekeepers to rob the hive without sulphuring the bees to death)

Since hives in Greece were set on slopes of thyme
To win sweet gold for Heroes' cups of mead
The gods themselves have shown no kinder deed
To Insect or to Man than that of thine!
Certain it is no honeyed words of mine
Can do thee justice, Langstroth, so I plead
For Jove's Hymettus Bees of sacred breed
To weave in Attic chorus round thy shrine.
Next, Saturn's son, dispatch their golden kin
Whom Virgil lauded in Georgic lay!
Wontan and Thor send Germans black as sin!
Sweet Aphrodite Bees from Paphos Bay!
And Ra from perfumed bean-fields by Nile's brim
Those scarab Bees that nest in pipes of clay

—From Poems of a Bee-Keeper, Everard Stokes.

=== Beekeeping ===
Lorenzo Langstroth, known as the "Father of Beekeeping," had a unique way of capturing the essence of his bees through writing letters; these letters revealed his devoted connection to bees. Through his interpretations of bees, he studied the behavior and the equipment used to house them. After discovering many unanswered questions with the current equipment, Langstroth knew he could provide a solution. Langstroth originally was trying to improve the Bevan bar hive because he found that the combs could not be removed and this gave him a huge advantage to create a better hive. Langstroth discovered that the bees kept filling holes necessary to take the hive out with propolis, bee glue, so he came up with a new solution. On his journey to create the perfect frame, Lorenzo found it helpful to write a manual of his findings. His book, Langstroth on the Hive and the Honeybee: A Beekeeper's Manual, became a fundamental teaching mechanism for students of beekeeping. His book is considered a basic text on the skill of beekeeping because it is more of a "how to" explanation of beekeeping. The book states information related to bees, honey, and beekeeping. Langstroth sees beekeeping "in the present state of public opinion, it requires no little courage to venture upon the introduction of a new hive and system of management; but I feel confident that a new era in bee-keeping has arrived." Langstroth viewed bees as holy creatures: "Tongues in trees, books in the running brooks, Sermons in 'bees,' and 'God' in every thing". With Langstroth's love of bees inevitably came his invention of the moveable bee-frame. The moveable beehives solved the problem by providing a space between the frames and the hive walls, bottom, and top cover. The moveable-frame beehive was patented in 1852, No 9300. This invention of the beehive marks the new era of the beehive. Three advantages Langstroth states of the moveable frame are: 1. "The scientific beekeeper could examine every comb quickly and easily. The Langstroth hive would be cheap, and the combs could be removed with safety to the bees." 2. "The practical beekeeper, who wished an income from his bees, could propagate queens, make artificial swarms, supply destitute hives with honey or brood, and produce honey ready for the market in boxes or in glass tumblers, and he could protect his hives against the bee moth. In short, he could do almost anything he wanted to do with his bees." 3. "The farmer could easily procure honey for his own use".

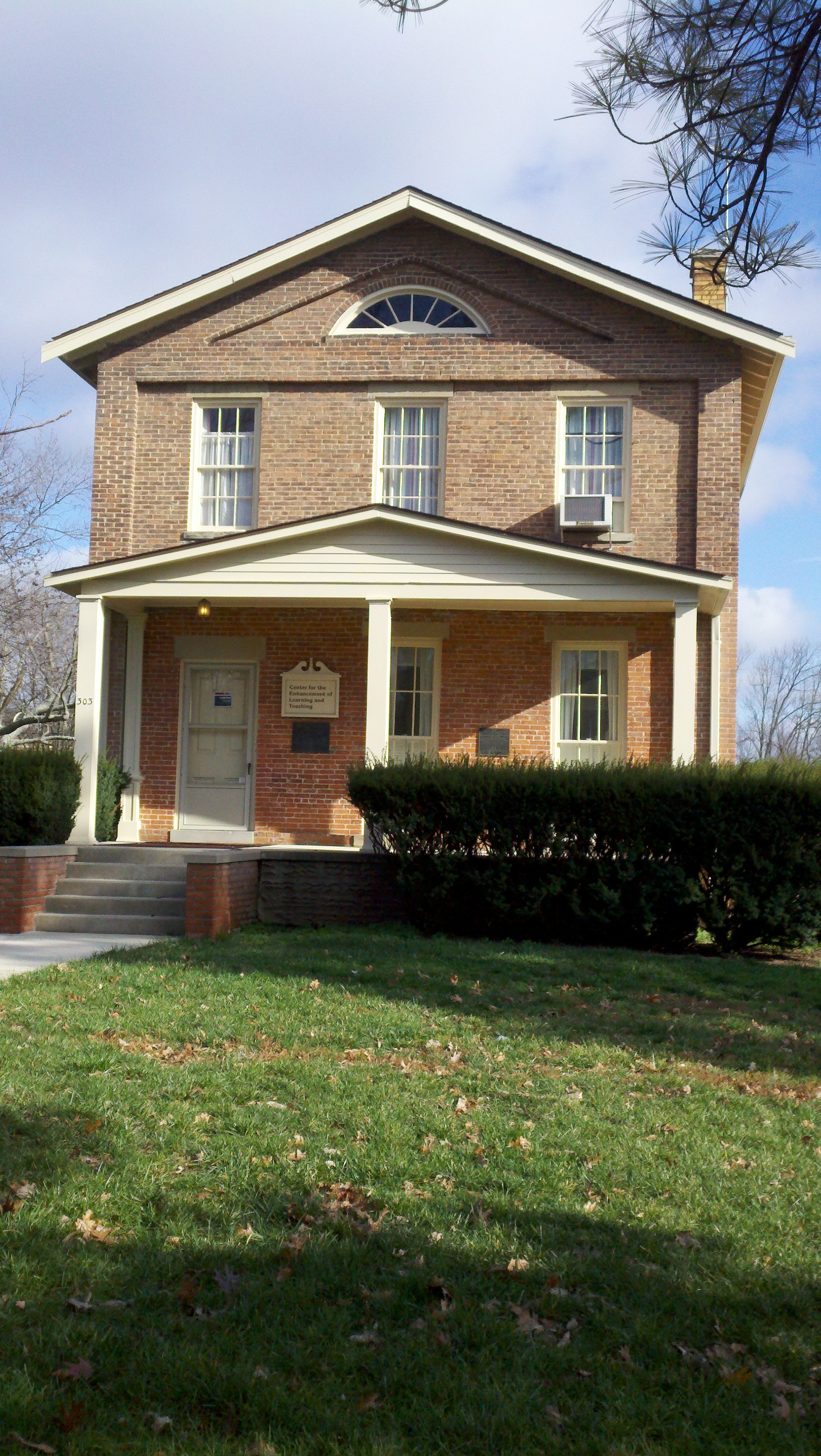
Front of the cottage in 2011

=== Italian beekeeping ===
In 1859, Langstroth arranged to start importing Italian Bees from Jan Dzeirzon of Silesia. Langstroth and his son became successful at breeding Italian queen Bees, ultimately selling them at twenty dollars. The term twenty-dollar queens soon became known in America. Using the Italian queens to his advantage, Langstroth bred the foreign bees with the local bees, causing changes in bee color, characteristic, and honey production. All of Langstroth's bees became more obedient and hard-working, producing more honey.

=== Beekeeping today ===
Since Langstroth's invention of the moveable beehive, the Oxford Community celebrates beekeeping through programs and events. One of the most famous local Ohio gatherings took place in 1969 for the summer meeting of the Ohio State Beekeepers' Association Inc. The two-day program featured outstanding lectures, apiary demonstrations, and films for those interested in beekeeping. In addition to these activities, participant contests, a benefit auction for the Ohio Honey Bee Queen Program, Karl Maslowski nature films and tours of the Miami University campus were held. In the Spring of 2017, a group of students founded the Miami Apiculture Society. It's the first student organization on campus to continue Langstroth's tradition of beekeeping in Oxford.

== Landmark designation ==
The Cottage was the second Miami University building to be designated a National Historic Landmark. In order to receive this designation, the building had to go through a three-step process: first includes a preliminary study with an on-site visit and preparation of a recommendation by a staff member of the program; next, an evaluation by the Consulting Committee on National Historic Landmarks; and finally, a submission of nominations approved by the Committee for Designation by the Secretary of the Interior. Since the cottage is a National Landmark, it is eligible for consideration of federal grants-in-aid for historic preservation.

The Historical Marker about Langstroth Cottage reads: 'Reverend Lorenzo Langstroth, renowned as "The Father of American Beekeeping" lived in this simple two-story, eight-room house with his wife, Anne, and their three children from 1858 to 1887. Unchanged externally, the Greek Revival cottage features classic brick pilasters and pediments and a fan-shaped front window. In his garden workshop, Langstroth made experimental hives, established an apiary, and on the ten acres which surrounded his home grew buckwheat, clover, an apple orchard, and a "honey garden" of flowers. From his hives, he shipped Italian queen bees across the United States and around the world.

The Langstroth Cottage was placed on the National Register of Historic Places in 1976 and was designated a National Historic Landmark in 1982.'
