= Mary Elizabeth Tillinghast =

American artist (1845–1912)

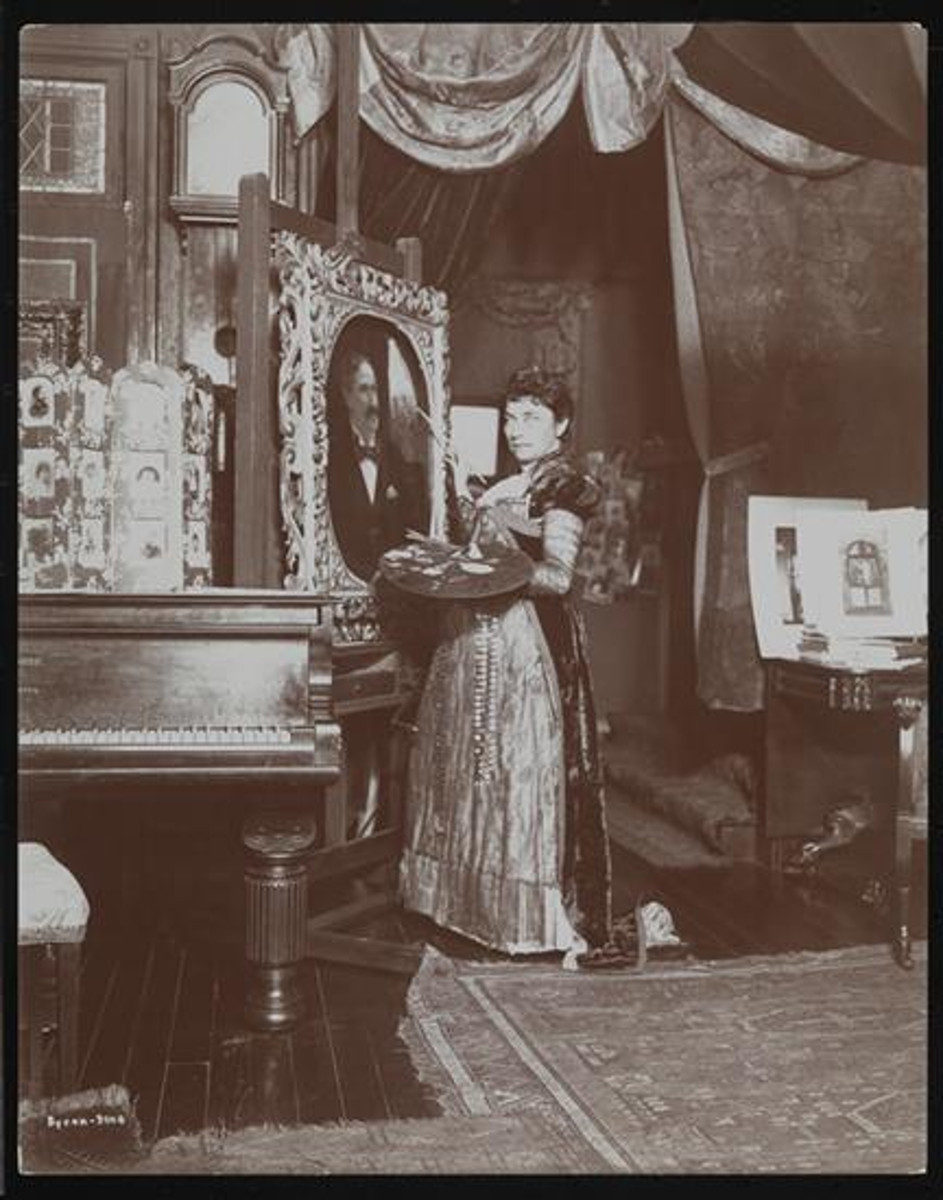
Tillinghast at her easel, circa 1897

Mary Elizabeth Tillinghast (1845 - December 15, 1912) was an American artist. Best known for stained glass, her professional career encompassed roles as architect, muralist, mosaic artist, textile artist, inventor, writer, and studio boss.

Tillinghast trained in Paris, then embarked on a commercial career in the decorative arts studios of 1880s New York City. Her early career was marked with successes despite a chaotic business relationship with John La Farge that ended in years of public litigation. Once independent, from the mid-1880s until her death in 1912, Tillinghast continued to produce major stained glass commissions while also running a stable, successful decorative arts business, working from a well-known studio in Greenwich Village.

== Biography ==
=== Early life ===
Tillinghast was born in New York in 1845, the daughter of the wealthy merchant and land speculator Philip Tillinghast (1808–1879) and his wife Julia Anne Cozzens Titus. The family moved from Manhattan to Clinton Hill, Newark, in the 1850s, where a street bears the family name. She was taught privately and traveled with her father to Europe. From 1872 to 1878, she studied painting in Paris, under Carolus-Duran and others.

Her father, Philip, was ruined in the financial panic of 1873 and died in 1879. While the family retained some means and its social connections, Mary made a vocation for herself out of her art training. Within a few years, from 1878 to 1884, she got direct experience in the flourishing decorative arts studios of the time, in both the Tiffany camp and the La Farge camp.

=== Tiffany and La Farge ===
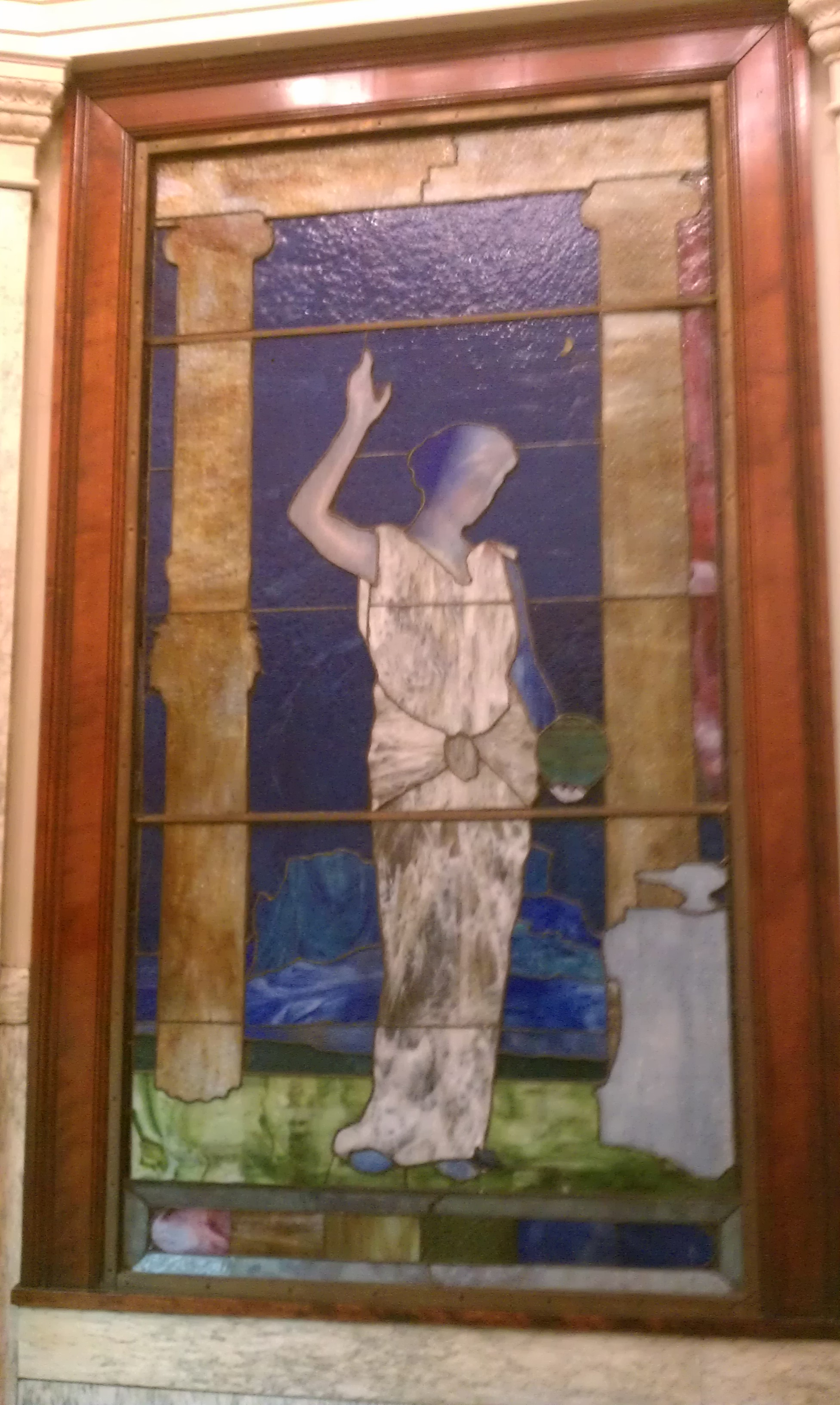
Urania, Allegheny Observatory, 1903

In February 1881 Tillinghast became an employee of pioneering interior designer Candace Wheeler, at that time of Tiffany & Wheeler. For all of Wheeler's professional support of other women, the job lasted only until mid-July, then within months she and Tillinghast had a legal dispute in 1881–82 over a patented tapestry stitch. Wheeler considered Tillinghast's patent application for a "Needle-Woven Tapestry" stolen from her studios, and filed suit. Ultimately the two patent applications were found to be non-conflicting, and the suit dismissed. Tillinghast's patent was granted November 8, 1882. (Her address was given as West Orange, New Jersey.)

By that time, Tillinghast had already left Wheeler's employment, gone to work for John La Farge, become head of his embroidery department, and went to work within his legendary decorative arts and stained glass design studios. From La Farge she learned the art of designing and making windows, along with the benefit of access to his craftsmen. During her tenure the firm landed part of the plum commission for The Union League Club in 1881. In October 1882 she embarked with him as equal partners in a business entity called "John La Farge and Tillinghast", an attempt to deliver years of backlog, re-order the firm's finances, and preserve its client list. This lasted a year, with little success. Its successor was the La Farge Decorative Art Company, recapitalized and headed by George A. Chamberlain, the man who became La Farge's virtual nemesis in the ensuing years of litigation over the company's artistic assets. La Farge was charged with larceny for refusing to hand over his own work, an unfortunate turn in his career. Tillinghast remained involved and became a third party in these suits, both La Farge and Chamberlain unhappy with her.

In 1883, she produced a professional coup, a commission for heavy French-blue tapestries hung as curtains in the library of the Cornelius Vanderbilt II House on Fifth Avenue and 57th Street—fabricated with a new process, attributed to her alone. Vanderbilt's well-publicized, often-mentioned fee to Tillinghast for those tapestries was $30,000. In contrast, La Farge had been fired by the Vanderbilts and blacklisted among their social circle.

=== Independence ===
In the following years, Tillinghast relocated to Washington for a year or so, executing a number of house renovations for clients, including Alexander Graham Bell. She returned to Europe for further training, again with Carolus-Duran and with Jean-Jacques Henner. Once resettled back in New York City's Greenwich Village, near her family's original home, she would work from her well-known, famously unheated studios at No. 3 Washington Square North for the rest of her life. One regular patroness for stained glass artwork and other projects was the moneyed philanthropist Mrs. Russell Sage.

Tillinghast's artwork took a large variety of forms, spanning textiles, oil portraits, interior design, and at least one complete mausoleum. Her business model continued to evolve as well, into a number of directions: home decoration, with a series of advice articles for Art Interchange magazine; the creation of "Tillinghast Studios" with an evident sideline in church furnishings; and an expanded architectural practice. Even in the narrow field of stained glass, according to her obituary in the American Art Directory, "Miss Tillinghast was the first to realize the difference that the electric lighting of churches was destined to make in the spectacular effect of window designs."

Mary Tillinghast was an architect and a member of the National Sculpture Society. Never married, she died at home in New York in late 1912. She is buried in Green-Wood Cemetery in Brooklyn. In 1913, painter Edward Hopper and his wife, Josephine, moved into the studio on the unheated top floor of No. 3 Washington Square North and lived there until May 1967.

== Work ==
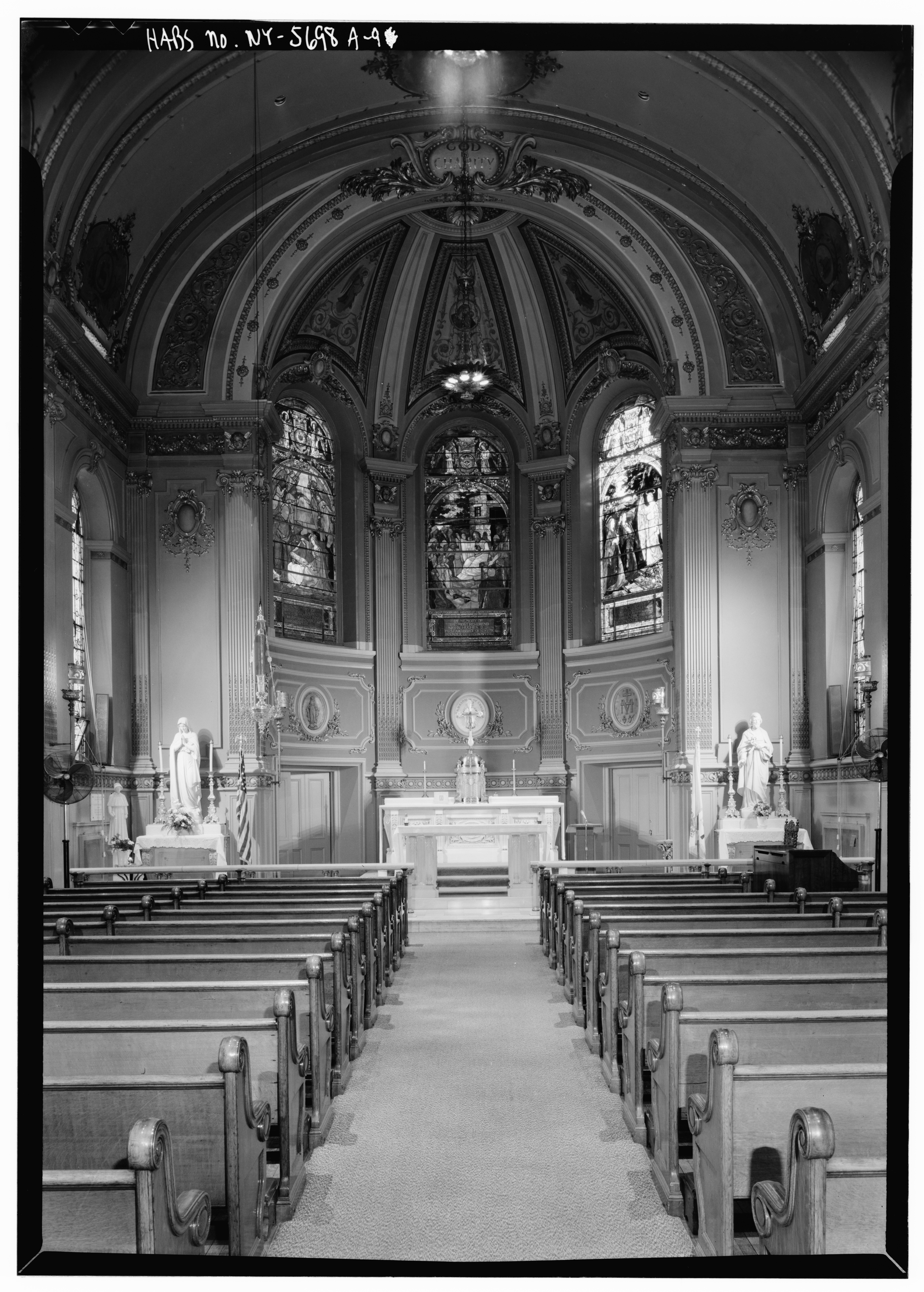
stained glass windows of the chapel, St. Vincent's Hospital, 1889

The work of Tillinghast includes:

- Jacob's Dream, Grace Episcopal Church, New York City, 1887
- stained glass windows at the Elizabeth Seton Building, St. Vincent's Hospital chapel, Greenwich Village, NYC, for architects Schickel & Ditmars, 1889; re-located to St. Peters hospital in New Brunswick, N.J. circa 2012
- three stained glass windows on resurrection theme, First Presbyterian Church (at Symphony Circle), Buffalo, New York, circa 1890
- multiple great windows and furnishings, St. Stephen's Episcopal Church, Pittsfield, Massachusetts, circa 1890
- Calvin S. Brice Window, Oxford Female Seminary (now Miami University), Oxford, Ohio, 1892 (re-installed after 1980 in the Kumler Chapel)
- an entire tomb with integrated stained glass and mosaic work, the Gordon McKay Mausoleum, Pittsfield Cemetery, Pittsfield, Massachusetts, 1894
- mural decorations in the cafe, "unconventional and novel to a remarkable degree", in the original Hotel Savoy, NYC, 1895 (razed)
- stained-glass image of Urania for the Allegheny Observatory, Pittsburgh, Pennsylvania, installed July 1903
- St. Paul Preaching stained glass, First Presbyterian Church, Yonkers, New York, circa 1906
- multiple stained glass windows, along with crafted furnishings (baptismal font and reredos) credited to "Tillinghast Studio", for First Presbyterian Church, 620 West Genesee Street, Syracuse, New York, circa 1906-07
- The Revocation of the Edict of Nantes, for the New-York Historical Society, 1908
- stained glass windows, South Reformed Church (present-day Park Avenue Christian Church), NYC, for architects Cram, Goodhue, & Ferguson, circa 1909
- Trinity Episcopal Church, Asheville, North Carolina, for architect Bertram Goodhue, 1912 (her final commission)
- a portrait in stained glass of Mrs. James Brown Potter (as Charlotte Corday)
- the Gould Window, for Mrs. Russell Sage, for the Home for Friendless Children, NYC
- "memorial windows at churches in Terre Haute (M.E.) and Washington D.C. (Luth.) and large windows 'Faith, Hope and Charity' at Attleboro, Massachusetts."

== External sources ==
- bibliography assembled by researcher Kent Watkins
