= Hoyt Hall (Miami University) =

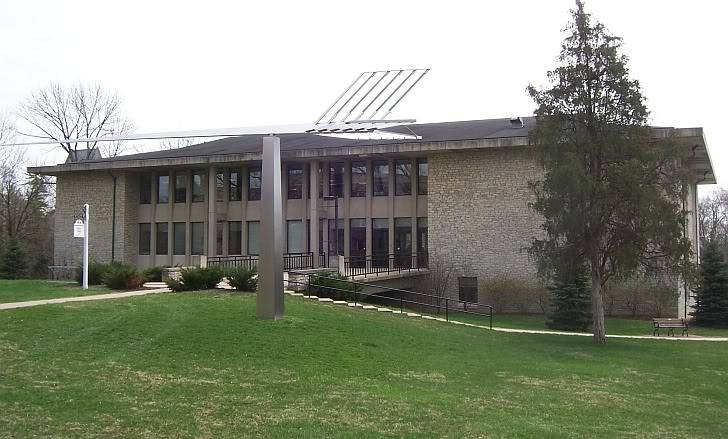
- Hoyt Hall on Western Campus at Miami University

- Location within Ohio
- Former names: Library Building, Hoyt Library

General information
- Location: Oxford, Ohio, United States
- Coordinates: 39°30′11.02″N 84°43′40.02″W
- Elevation: 2 m (7 ft)
- Current tenants: Career Planning and Placement Office, IT Services.
- Construction started: 1967
- Completed: 1971
- Inaugurated: 1968
- Cost: 5 million US dollar
- Client: Miami University

Website
- www.units.muohio.edu/careers/students/

Hoyt Hall is located on the western campus of Miami University in Oxford, OH. Currently Hoyt houses the Career Planning and Placement Office and IT Services.

Originally built and used as a library for the Western College for Women, replacing Alumnae Hall. It was converted into a hall in 1981, when Miami Trustees deemed it Hoyt Hall and the office for Career Services.

== History ==
In the fall of 1966 students of the Western College for Women launched a campaign to raise a million dollars to build a library for the college. There had been no library at the college, which was founded in 1853, up until this time. The nearest library to the campus was Miami University’s library that sat adjacent to the college.

In 1967 plans were drawn up to complete the construction of the library and the Western Board of Trustees established an Executive Committee to solicit funds. In the winter of 1972 students moved 70,000 books into the building. Originally known as the Library Building, the Western Trustees voted to designate it Hoyt Library in honor of Dean Phyllis Hoyt in March 1974. Before the 1973-74 school years, both presidents signed an agreement for an affiliation between the two schools. In 1974, Western became part of Miami University. In the winter of 1972 students moved 70,000 books into the building.

In 1976 the library was allocated no books and funds for the library were cut. This was due largely in part to the merging of Western College and Miami University. University officials did not see the need in providing funds and books to the library when the King Library collection could support both campuses. After the college and Miami merged the Trustees found it suitable to move the library resources over to King Library. They had stated that Hoyt Library was created for a college that was no longer in existence and Western had developed ideas for better uses and funds than supporting the library. In 1981, the Career Planning and Placement Office displaced the library and the Miami Trustees voted to change the building’s name to Hoyt Hall.

== Dr. Phyllis Hoyt ==
Phyllis Hoyt was born in West Somerville, Mass. on February 8, 1918. In 1939 she earned an A.B. degree from Russell Sage College and Tufts University conferred an M.A. degree on her in 1940. In summers she also attended Boston University, Harvard, and Syracuse. From 1940 to 1946 she was on the faculty of Lasell Junior College as an Instructor of History and as Dean 1944-46. In fall 1946 she came to Western College at Miami University, as an Assistant to the Dean and Head of McKee Hall. From 1947 to 1952 she served as Assistant Dean of Students and subsequently as Director of Student Activities. In 1964 her title was changed to Dean of Student Activities and subsequently to Vice President. Hoyt was instrumental in hosting the Mississippi Freedom Summer Training in 1962 during the administration of President Herrick Young. In 1974 she resigned her position at Western College to become Vice President for Student Affairs at Russell Sage College. In 1974 the Russell Sage College Alumnae Association presented her with the Doris L. Crockett Distinguished Service Award.
