= Thomas Hastings (architect) =

American architect (1860–1929)

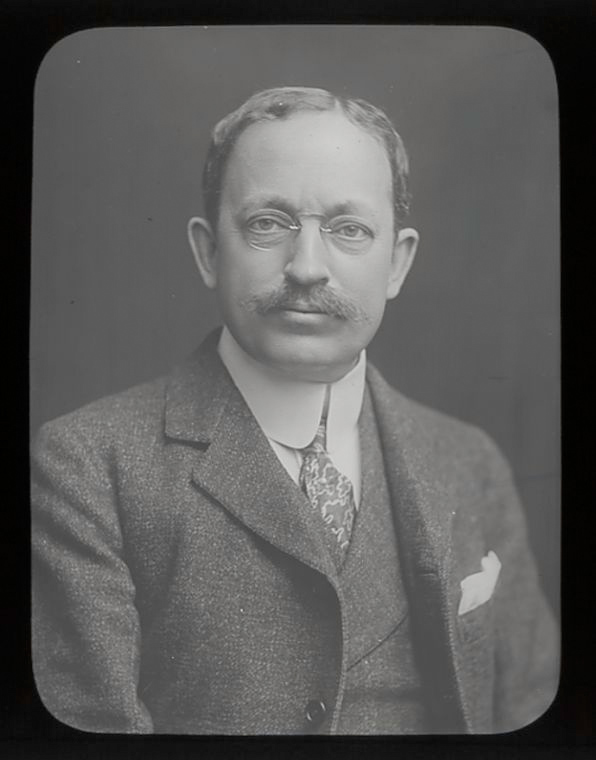
- Born: March 11, 1860; New York City, US
- Died: October 22, 1929 (aged 69); Mineola, New York, US
- Education: Columbia University
- Occupation: Architect
- Employer: Carrère and Hastings

Thomas Hastings (March 11, 1860 – October 22, 1929) was an American architect, and a partner in the firm of Carrère and Hastings (active 1885–1929).

== Biography ==
He was born in New York City to Thomas Samuel Hastings, a Presbyterian minister, and Fanny de Groot. Hastings came from a colonial Yankee background, his ancestor Thomas Hastings having come from the East Anglia region of England to the Massachusetts Bay Colony in 1634. Hastings's father was president of the Union Theological Seminary. His grandfather, also named Thomas Hastings, was the composer of the hymn Rock of Ages. He married Helen Benedict of Greenwich, Connecticut.

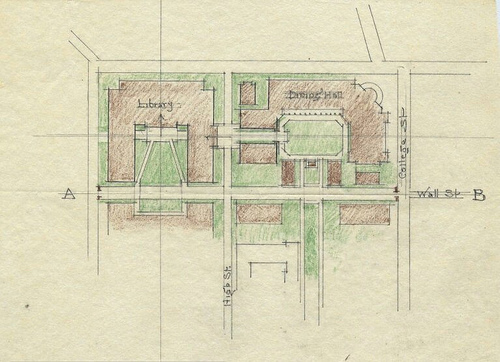
Drawing by Thomas Hastings of the Yale University Quadrangle, New Haven, Connecticut. Carrère and Hastings designed Woolsey Hall and University Commons at Yale, erected 1901–1902

Hastings abandoned his college preparation courses to work with the chief designer at Herter Brothers, the premier New York furnishers and decorators. He later traveled to Paris to study in the atelier of Louis-Jules André, and later returned to the U.S. to found the firm of Carrère and Hastings with John Merven Carrère. Their first major commissions came from a parishioner of Hastings' father, Florida developer Henry Flagler. The partners undertook two hotels for Flagler, the Ponce de Leon Hotel (1885–1888) in St. Augustine, Florida (now part of Flagler College) and the Hotel Alcazar (now the Lightner Museum), followed by a succession of St. Augustine hotels and churches.

The firm's most famous project was the New York Public Library at Fifth Avenue and 42nd Street. They were also instrumental in creating the profession of urban planning, with Carrére's influential designs for Cleveland, Hartford and Atlantic City. Their varied work included the Manhattan Bridge (1899), the House and Senate Office Buildings in Washington, and Blairsden, and the C. Ledyard Blair estate in Peapack, New Jersey (1896).

After Carrère's death in 1911, Hastings went on to design the Arlington National Cemetery Tomb of the Unknowns and the Henry Clay Frick House on Fifth Avenue, as well as residences for such distinguished names as Guggenheim, duPont, Harriman, even a 'poultry cottage' for William K. Vanderbilt. He also designed the Fort Washington Presbyterian Church (1913). He designed the 435-foot (132.59 m) tall Tower of Jewels, the centerpiece of San Francisco's 1915 Panama–Pacific International Exposition. After World War I, Hastings designed Kumler Chapel at Miami University in Oxford, Ohio in 1917–18, and designed the American Monument in Meaux, France, that memorialized the defeat of Germany at the Second Battle of the Marne, finally completed in 1932 after Hastings' death.

Hastings was a founding member of the U.S. Commission of Fine Arts, serving from 1910 to 1917. In 1906, he was elected into the National Academy of Design as an Associate member, and became a full Academician in 1909.

== Gallery ==
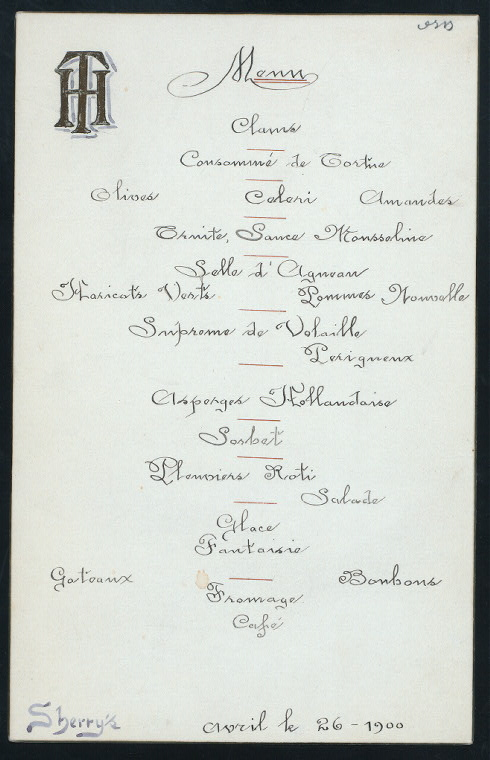
Menu for dinner for Hastings on eve of his wedding to Helen Benedict. Sherry's, Manhattan, April 26, 1900.

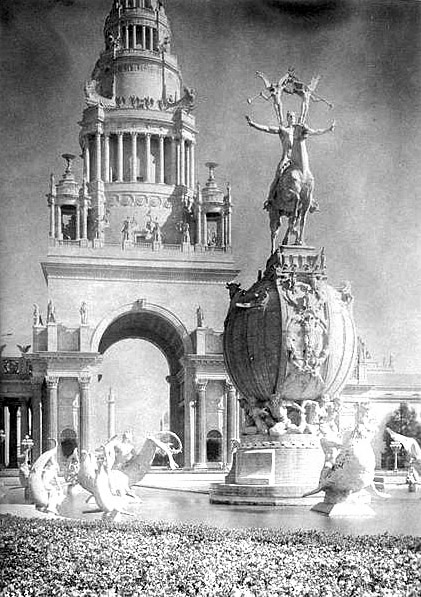
Tower of Jewels and Fountain of Energy, Panama–Pacific International Exposition, San Francisco (1915).

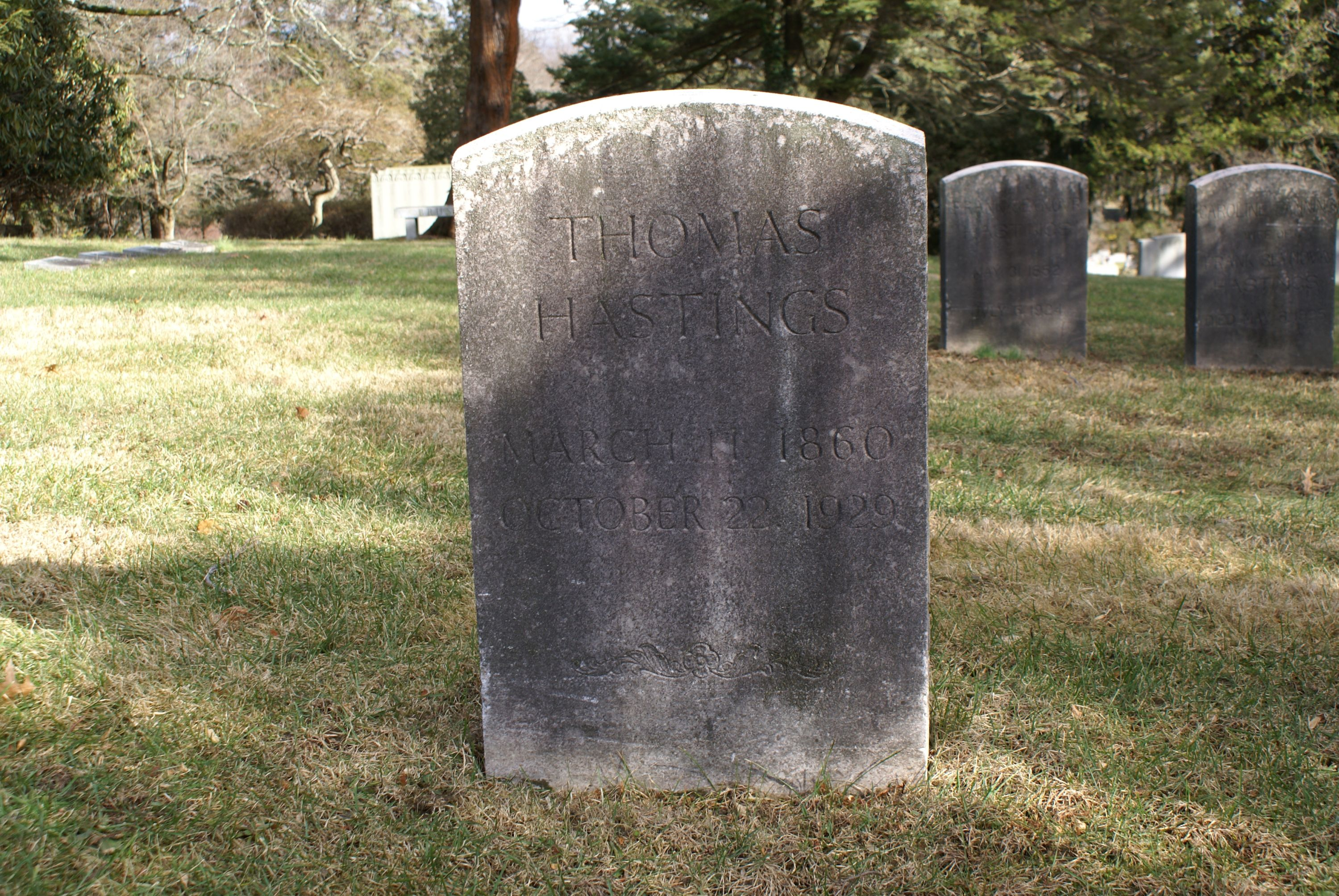
The grave of Thomas Hastings at Putnam Cemetery.

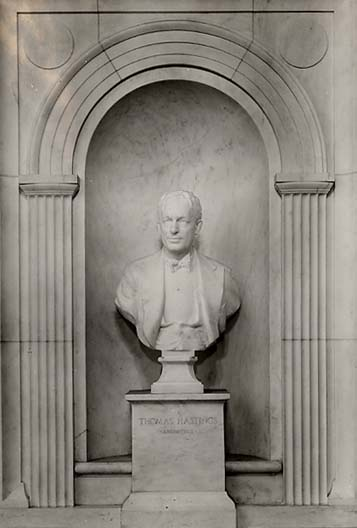
Bust of Thomas Hastings (1933) by Frederick William MacMonnies, New York Public Library.
