= Mavity =

Mavity is a surname. Notable people with the surname include:

- Abigail Mavity (born 1993), American actress
- Hubert Mavity, pseudonym of Nelson S. Bond (1908–2006) for a story published in Dynamic Science Stories
- Jim Mavity (born c. 1939), tennis coach of the Houston Wranglers
- Leon Mavity, American football player on the 1961 Colorado Buffaloes football team and on the Toronto Rifles
- Nancy Barr Mavity (1890–1959), American crime mystery author
- Rick Mavity (fl. 1990s–2000s), Nashville police detective who arrested country singer Jeff Bates, and later retrieved a guitar stolen from Bates

Mavity is an alternative name for "gravity", introduced in the Doctor Who episode Wild Blue Yonder.
