= Mary Lyon Residence Hall =

Former student dormitory in Oxford, Ohio

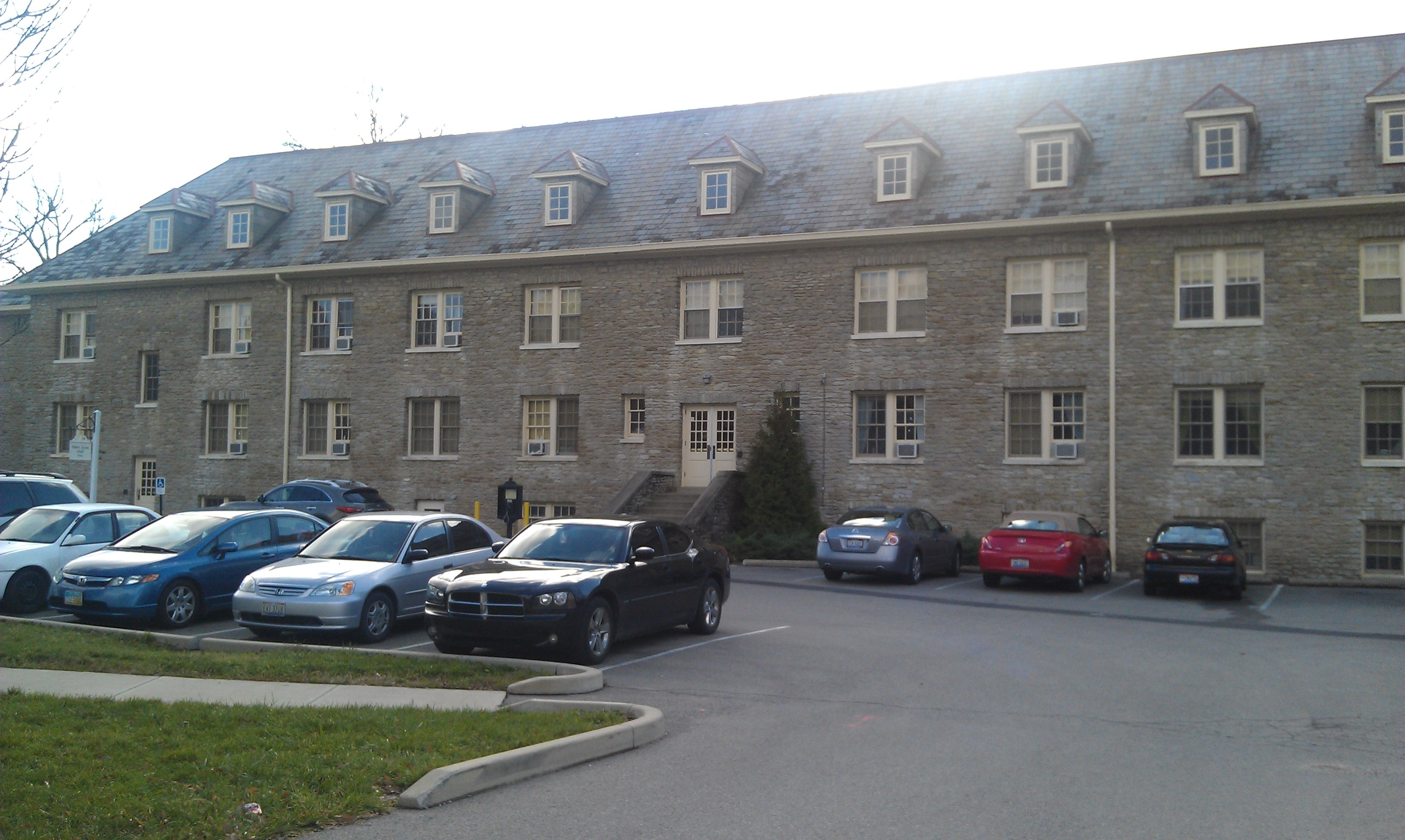
- Mary Lyon Residence Hall

- Location within Ohio

General information
- Type: Residential Living/ Student Housing
- Location: Oxford, Ohio, United States
- Coordinates: 39°30′13.18″N 84°43′38.56″W
- Construction started: 1923
- Completed: 1925
- Inaugurated: 13 June 1925
- Demolished: 2016
- Cost: $106,000
- Owner: Miami University

Technical details
- Structural system: Limestone
- Floor count: 3 plus basement

Design and construction
- Architect: WW Boyd
- Main contractor: Joe Wespiser

Mary Lyon Residence Hall was a three-story student dormitory on Western Campus at Miami University, demolished in 2016. It was a co-ed dormitory and only the first and second floors were used for living space. The third floor was vacant and only the employees of the Physical Facility Department had keys to enter that story. The building was made of limestone. It housed 81 students; three of the 81 were residence hall agents and there was only one hall adviser.

== Residence Hall information ==
Mary Lyon Residence Hall was well kept by the Miami University Physical Facilities Department. The Office of Residence Life at the university keeps tracked of who lived in the building and who worked there. In spring and summer of 2011 some work was done to re-wire the electricity so that the building was safer and able to support new technology. The building was part of Miami University's purchase of Western College Women's Seminary. The seminary was designed after Mount Holyoke Female Seminary, established by Mary Lyon. Therefore, in order to understand why Mary Lyon is a significant name for this residence hall, one must understand the values of Western College to imagine what activities used to occur at the Mary Lyon Building.

Although the residence hall was built in 1925, it was not named until 1934. It was built on ground received from the Patterson Estate. Mary Lyon Residence Hall was demolished in 2016.

== History of Western College ==
Mary Lyon was a strong Christian woman who founded a women's seminary for middle class women called Mount Holyoke in South Hadley, Massachusetts. Mount Holyoke was unique for its strong values, operation and administration, and its purpose. Mount Holyoke was highly regarded and was modeled by numerous schools. One of the earliest to adapt the women's seminary style school for higher education was Western College for Women, in Ohio. Western College was often referred to as the "Mount Holyoke of the West." It opened in 1855 by a woman named Helen Peabody. Peabody could not have opened the Seminary without the help of a young man named Daniel Tenny, who became the first president of the campus. He was married to a Mount Holyoke graduate, and he came to Miami University in 1851. He was excited about the level of education at Miami, and wanted to help establish a similar seminary for women that would also focus heavily on solid academics. He believed in higher education for women. So, he found land and gave a lot of energy toward creating it. By 1853 he incorporated a governing board of "The Western Female Seminary."The Virgin Daughter of Holyoke," they called it—forever consecrated to the material ideals and practices. Tenny became president of trustees, and said he could do so because he was a pastor. In 1855 when it opened, there were 150 pupils. The teachers were graduates and former staff from Holyoke itself.

== Mary Lyon’s Foundation ==
By 1923 over 300 attended the university and more space was needed. Plans for a new residence hall were drawn in 1923. In 1925 the hall was finished and named for Mary Lyon. There was an honorary ceremony on the buildings opening. A Dedication Hymn that was sung in 1925 by Marison F. Villson and Edgar Stillman Kelley was:

From out the tower, oh bells, send forth,
The triumph of your song,
Till far beyond the hills of home
Your echoes float along.

In your deep voice, the ocean’s roar,
The forest’s ancient moan,
And softly there the river sings
Her rippled undertone.
Your bronze was cast in Hope’s hot fire.
Love taught your tongue to pray,
Ring out, oh bells, and challenge,
Life unto a nobler day!

So may we who have heard your voice
Strive on to right the wrong,
That in your lives the world may hear
The echo of your song.

== Life at Mary Lyon ==
The daily life of a Western Seminary Woman was focused intently around the Christian values instated by Mary Lyon. Therefore, the habits of the residents at Mary Lyon Residence Hall were suited for longevity and vitality in life. Rigorous courses required, including seven math and science classes. The women were made to walk one mile after breakfast each day, and winters to just walk 45 minutes. They also did calisthenics in empty hallways until there was a gymnasium. Teachers were not paid well, and the students did domestic duties to keep costs low. This was an early sign of the idea of work/study, at school. Mary Lyon also wanted the Mount Holyoke Seminary to have visible means of grace—one example of this was the "recess meetings" or short "seasons" of prayer at 8 pm each night. To have mentors and close personal attention and guidance, the Western students were to be divided into 8-10 sections; each section with its own teacher, this way the teacher can instill their personal values and have a personal mentor relationship with the student. Tenny said, physical exercise, was the strongest test of loyalty to the university.

Mary Lyon's strength and affinity for physical exertion is noted in many biographies—all of which note her allusions to the importance of exercise in her many letters often referenced.

Principles of the Seminary, (derived from Mount Holyoke): 1. Accommodations for boarders 2. Teachers to be modest and receive modest salaries 3. Neat, plain, simple lifestyle promoted 4. Domestic work done by students 5. Board and tuition placed at cost...keep prices low 6. Whole plan to be conducted under the principles of the missionary; no surplus income to teachers

It was common to find the women cleaning Mary Lyon, and having social time to play games in the basement rooms where they had tables and chairs and pianos available.
