= Western College for Women =

1855–1974 college in Oxford, Ohio, US

Coordinates: 39°30′14″N 84°43′40″W

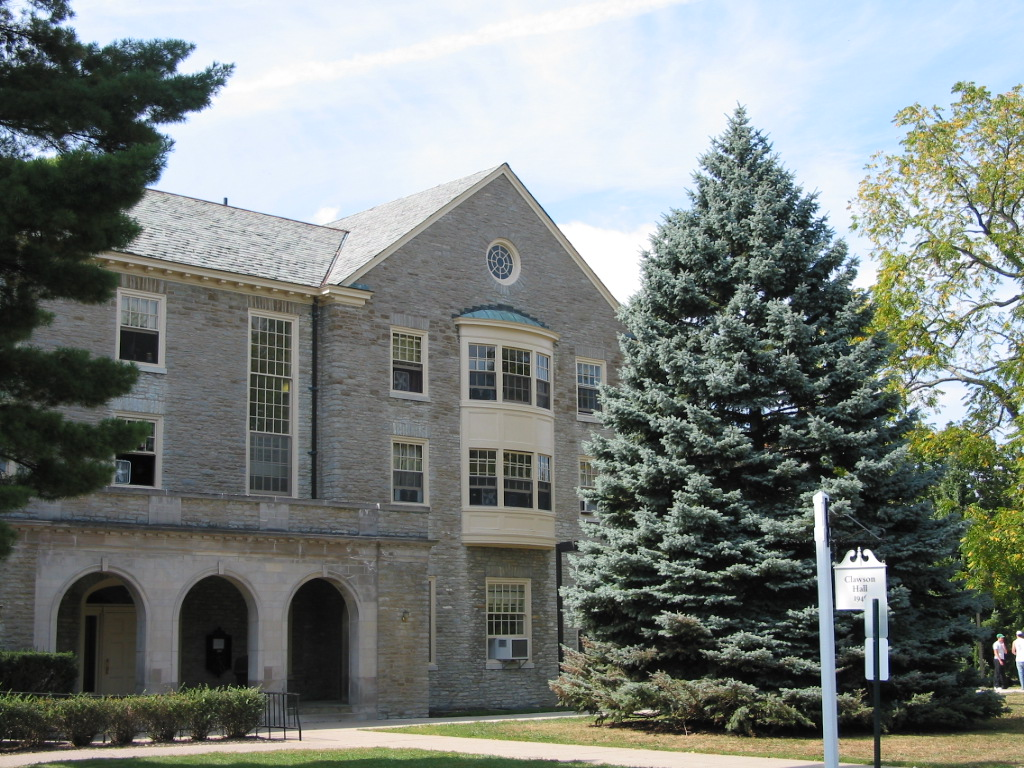
- Clawson Hall on the Western Campus of Miami University
- Type: Women's College
- Active: 1853–1974
- Location: Oxford, Ohio, United States
- Western Female Seminary
- U.S. National Register of Historic Places
- U.S. Historic district
- Location within Ohio
- Location: US 27 and OH 73, Western College, Miami University, Oxford, Ohio
- Area: 107 acres (43 ha)
- Built: 1861 to 1972
- Architectural style: Romanesque, Colonial Revival
- NRHP reference No.: 09000083
- Added to NRHP: September 17, 1979

Western College for Women, known at other times as Western Female Seminary and simply Western College, was a women's and later coed liberal arts college in Oxford, Ohio, between 1853 and 1974. Initially a seminary, it was the host of orientation sessions for the Freedom Summer in 1964. It was absorbed by Miami University in 1974 after dwindling finances. Now known as the Western Campus of Miami University, it was designated a U.S. Historic district as the Western Female Seminary Historic District in 1979.

== History ==
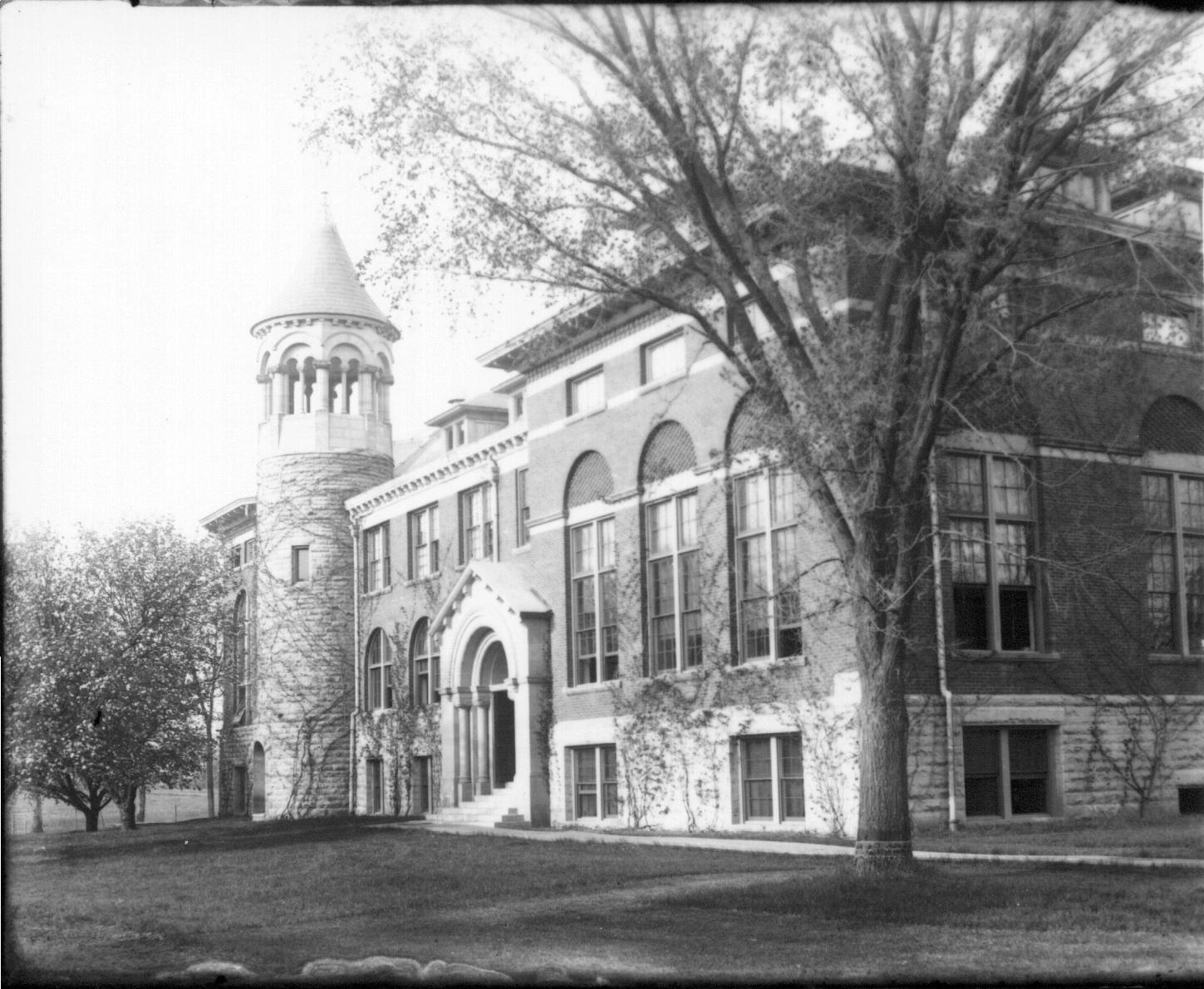
Alumnae Hall was the central building on Western College's campus from 1892 until it was torn down in 1977.

Western College was founded in 1853 as Western Female Seminary. It was a daughter school of Mount Holyoke College in South Hadley, Massachusetts, and its first principal, Helen Peabody, was a Holyoke graduate. The college changed its name three times, in 1894 to The Western: A College and Seminary for Women, in 1904 to Western College for Women, and in 1971 to The Western College when the institution became coeducational.

Western remained an independent women's college until 1970 when it formed a "committee of cooperation" with the adjacent Miami University, which opened enrollment between the colleges on a limited basis. This allowed Western students to take classes at Miami and use Miami's computer and hospital facilities, for example, while allowing Miami students access to intramural fields, library space, and cross-country runways on Western grounds. Before the 1973–74 school years, both presidents signed an agreement for an affiliation between the two schools. In 1974, Western became part of Miami due to financial difficulties.

On September 17, 1979, 15 buildings and 11 structures from the former Western College were designated the Western Female Seminary Historic District.

=== Civil Rights Movement ===
In June 1964, an orientation and training in nonviolence techniques was held on the campus of Western College for Women for volunteers heading south to Mississippi for Freedom Summer. While training at Western was still on-going, Mickey Schwerner, a veteran civil rights worker who had come to Oxford to help train the new recruits, received word that one of the churches that had agreed to host Freedom Summer activities had been attacked and burned. Schwerner and Andrew Goodman, a new volunteer, left Oxford immediately to head back to Mississippi. Schwerner's wife, Rita, remained behind at Western College to finish the training. Within days, Schwerner and Goodman, along with James Chaney, a native Mississippian and voting rights activist, were reported missing in Philadelphia, Mississippi. Their bodies were found months later, buried in an earthen dam. Public uproar over these murders helped pass the Civil Rights Act of 1964 and the Voting Rights Act a few months later. A memorial to the Freedom Summer activists was dedicated in 2000 on the Western College campus.

== Legacy ==
In 1974, the Western College for Women merged with Miami University and became the Western College Program, an interdisciplinary studies program. In 2007, the Western College Program was integrated into the College of Arts and Sciences and is now known as the Western Program for Individualized Studies.

Of the original Western College buildings, Boyd Hall, Clawson Hall, Hoyt Library, Kumler Chapel, McKee Hall, Thomson Hall, and Peabody Hall were retained as either academic building or dormitories. Since the merger, four new dormitories and a dining hall were also added to the Western Campus.

== Notable alumnae ==
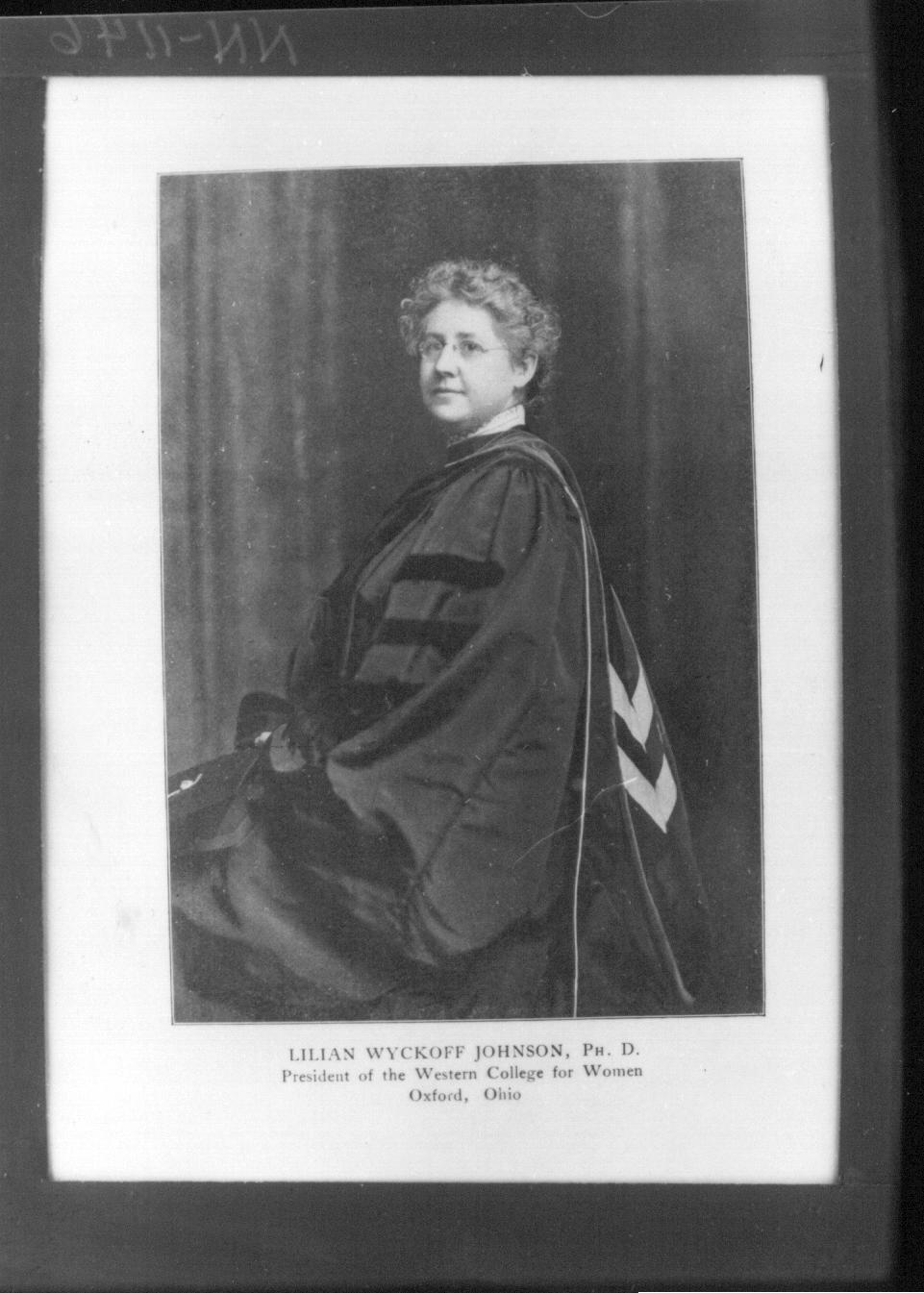
Lilian Wyckoff Johnson, the first woman to receive a doctorate from Cornell University, served as president of Western College from 1904 to 1906.

- Margaret Caroline Anderson, founder-editor The Little Review
- Edith Evans Asbury, journalist
- Esin Atıl, curator
- Robin L. Bartlett, economist
- Wilhelmina von Bremen, Olympic runner
- Mary Letitia Caldwell, winner of the Garvan Medal for chemistry
- Penny Colman, author
- Eliza Calvert Hall, author and suffragist
- Sarah Jane Dawes Shedd, missionary in Persia
- Natalie de Blois, architect
- Ameerah Haq, Under-Secretary-General of the United Nations
- Mary Garrett Hay, suffragist and community organizer
- Dorothy Misener Jurney, the "godmother of women's pages"
- Helene Mambu, Congolese physician and International Public Health Expert
- Nancy Barr Mavity, crime mystery writer
- Ann Marcus, television writer
- Pamela Mboya, Kenyan representative, UN-Habitat
- Gladys Milligan, painter
- Hank Phillippi Ryan, reporter and novelist
- Donna Shalala, former member of the U.S. House of Representatives, 18th United States Secretary of Health and Human Services and university administrator
- Sylvia Stanfield, diplomat
- Maliha Zulfacar, professor and Afghan ambassador to Germany
- Ester Neira de Calvo, educator, feminist and women's right advocate
- Carolyn Jefferson-Jenkins, educator and voting rights advocate.
- Greta Pope, vocalist and vocal coach

== See also ==
- List of current and historical women's universities and colleges
- Alumnae Hall (Western College for Women)
- Hoyt Hall (Miami University)
- Kumler Chapel
- Langstroth Cottage
- Mary Lyon Residence Hall
- Peabody Hall (Miami University)
