= Jerome Conley =

American politician (born 1965)

Former Mayor of Oxford

Personal details
- Born: 1965 (age 60–61) Muncie, Indiana, U.S.
- Party: Democratic
- Education: Indiana University (BS)

Jerome Conley (born 1965, Muncie, Indiana) is a former Mayor of Oxford, Ohio. He is the Dean of University Libraries at Miami University. Appointed in 2013, Dean Conley has been working for Miami University in several capacities starting in 1992. He was given an honorary alumnus award on May 3, 2018.

== Personal life ==
Conley graduated from Indiana University Bloomington with a B.S. in political science. He has 3 siblings, two brothers and a sister. He is a Methodist and an Indiana Pacers fan.
