= Western College Program =

The Western College Program was created in 1974 when the Western College for Women closed and Miami University acquired the campus. The program consisted of an interdisciplinary living/learning community with small class sizes and student-designed focuses. Majors included Interdisciplinary Studies, Environmental Science, and Environmental Studies. Academics were divided into three core areas: Creativity and Culture, Social Systems, and Natural Systems.

Western, also known as the School of Interdisciplinary Studies, was cited as a primary reason for Miami University making the list of "Public Ivies" in Richard Moll's book, The Public Ivies: A Guide to America's Best Public Undergraduate Colleges and Universities. In the mid-1960s, when it was the Western College for Women, the campus served as the staging ground for Freedom Summer, a voter registration drive in Mississippi.

== The Western campus ==
Located directly east of the main campus of Miami University, Western College is characterized by winding pathways through forest and stone bridges over creeks. Peabody Hall, currently a coed dormitory, is said to be haunted by its namesake Helen Peabody. Other buildings on Western Campus include McKee Hall, Mary Lyon Hall, Kumler Chapel, Western Lodge, Ernst Theater, Western Tower, Ice House, Summer House, Sawyer Hall (former gymnasium, heating plant, pool and dining hall), Boyd Hall, Hoyt Hall, the Art Museum, and non-WCP buildings, Clawson Hall, Alexander Dining Hall, Presser Hall, Langstroth Cottage, Havighurst Hall, and Thomson Hall.

== Merger with College of Arts and Sciences ==
In March 2006, Miami University Provost Jeffrey Herbst recommended to Miami University President Dr. James C. Garland that the Western College Program be phased out in favor of expanding Miami's Honors Program. The proposal called for the creation of the Western Honors College. This proposal met with resistance from Western faculty, students and alumnae.

On June 23, 2006, The board of trustees voted to eliminate the School of Interdisciplinary Studies in favor of a "Western Honors College" in an attempt to expand the honors program at Miami.

On October 24, 2006, the University Senate began deliberations on the persistence of the program (without the school classification).

In January 2007, it was announced that the Western College Program would be merged into the College of Arts and Sciences. The Western College Program became the Western Program, Department of Individualized Studies. Rather than having a department of permanent faculty, the program would have one central faculty member with students taking classes led by faculty in several different departments. Students now receive a Bachelor of Arts or Bachelor of Science degree rather than the Bachelor of Philosophy its graduates were awarded in the Western College Program. Critics say the program may provide diverse courses with faculty from different backgrounds but the student-faculty bond which was a strongly beneficial attribute of Western's previous incarnation may suffer. However, such concerns have turned out to be largely unfounded. The alleged plan to rid Western of permanent faculty never came to pass. After the transition, a number of Western College Program faculty remained as full-time faculty members for the Western Program.

== Notable alumni ==
- Leslie Greene Bowman, President of the Thomas Jefferson Foundation
- Shelia Curran, author
- Ryan Donmoyer, congressional and White House correspondent for Bloomberg News
- Nicole Fleetwood, art historian, curator, author, and MacArthur Fellow
- Jeffrey Horst, Atlanta Lawyer
- Chris Jennings, senior health care adviser for President Bill Clinton
- Austin Kleon, author of Newspaper Blackout and How to Steal Like an Artist
- Barbara A. Knuth, Professor and Dean of the Graduate School, Cornell University
- Bill McMahon, managing director of Goldman Sachs
- Jan Montgomery, Assistant General Counsel for Homeland Security & Justice, US GAO
- Thomas Porter, PhD., Senior Advisor to the USPS CISO's Office
- Tim Race, Business Editor, The New York Times
- David Rankin, CEO Great Lakes Protection Fund
- Steve Ricchetti, White House Deputy Chief of Staff for President Bill Clinton
- Ken Weil, Deputy Chief of Staff for Colorado Governor Bill Ritter
