= Bachelor of Philosophy =

Academic degree

- Acronym: BPhil; PhB
- Type: Bachelor's degree
- Duration: 2 to 4 years

Bachelor of Philosophy (BPhil or PhB; Latin: Baccalaureus Philosophiae or Philosophiae Baccalaureus or Baccalaureus in Philosophia) is the title of an academic degree that usually involves considerable research, either through a thesis or supervised research projects. Unlike many other bachelor's degrees, the BPhil is typically awarded to individuals who have already completed a traditional undergraduate degree.

== Australia ==
=== Australian National University ===
The Bachelor of Philosophy (PhB) is an individually tailored, research-based undergraduate degree in arts/social sciences or the natural sciences. Students undertake supervised research courses, entitled Advanced Studies Courses, each semester with researching academics, often on a one-to-one basis. Admission is open to the top one per cent of school-leavers (ATAR 99.00 or greater). The duration of the program is four years, including an honours year, where a research thesis is undertaken. In order to graduate with the degree, students are required to maintain a high distinction average (80 per cent and above) across all courses in each semester of the degree and must complete the honours year with first-class honours.

=== Macquarie University ===
The first year of Macquarie University's Master of Research program is referred to as a Bachelor of Philosophy.

=== University of Western Australia ===
The University of Western Australia also offers the Bachelor of Philosophy (BPhil) course for high-achieving new students. This is a research intensive degree which takes four years including an honours year and a research placement unit in second or third year. Students studying the course choose disciplines from any of the bachelor's degrees. Thus, admission is highly competitive and the cut-off entry rank for high school students is very high.

=== University of Tasmania ===
The Bachelor of Philosophy (BPhil) is an award that provides academic extension, personal development, and recognition for experiences outside the traditional degree structure, and it is available to students who are undertaking, or have undertaken, another undergraduate degree. Enrolment in the degree is limited to high achieving students who are deemed to be capable of successfully completing additional study alongside their principal degree. The BPhil is not offered as a standalone degree at UTAS and can only be completed concurrent with, or after completion of a principal undergraduate degree and entrants must have an ATAR above 90 or a current GPA above 5.5.

== Canada ==
The University of New Brunswick offers the BPhil as a seminar-based degree in interdisciplinary leadership.

== South Africa ==
Stellenbosch University offered a BPhil in journalism. Prospective students must have obtained a recognised undergraduate degree in any discipline and sat for the department's entrance examination, which is written across South Africa. Top-performing applicants are then invited to interview for final selection. The BPhil is regarded as one of the most sought after and demanding postgraduate offerings at the university.

== United Kingdom ==
=== University of Oxford ===
The BPhil's earliest form was as a University of Oxford graduate degree, first awarded in 1682. Originally, Oxford named its pre-doctoral graduate degrees the Bachelor of Philosophy (BPhil) and the Bachelor of Letters (BLitt). The BPhil was a two-year degree plan partly taught and completed through research requirements. The BLitt was a two-year research degree. After complaints, especially from overseas students, that this naming convention often meant that graduate degrees were not being recognised as such, the university renamed them Master of Philosophy (MPhil) and Master of Letters (MLitt). However, the Philosophy Faculty (then a sub-faculty) argued that its BPhil degree had become so well-known and respected in the philosophical world that it would be confusing to change the name. In philosophy, therefore, the degree continues to be called the BPhil. (Note that Oxford also offers a number of other graduate degrees labeled as baccalaureate degrees: the law faculty's BCL, and the music faculty's BMus.)

Today's Oxford BPhil course is a two-year programme of seminars, four essays (of up to 5,000 words each) and a research thesis (max. 30,000 words). The BPhil is regarded as a very demanding degree, and an academic background in philosophy is a prerequisite for admission.

The Oxford BPhil was designed to be a preparation for teaching philosophy at university level. Today it often also provides a foundation for doctoral (DPhil or PhD) work in philosophy. Notable graduates of the BPhil include: Amanda Askell, Cora Diamond, Daniel Dennett, George Boolos, Galen Strawson, G. A. Cohen, J. J. C. Smart, Kris Kristofferson, Patricia Churchland, Peter Singer, Paul Snowdon, Richard Swinburne, Rosalind Hursthouse, Thomas Friedman, Thomas Nagel, and William MacAskill. Filmmaker Terrence Malick started a BPhil course but left without a degree after a disagreement with his adviser, Gilbert Ryle.

=== Other universities ===
Several universities have adopted the Oxford model of the BPhil as a graduate degree, either as originally intended (in a variety of academic subjects) or as it subsequently developed (in philosophy only); for example, Dharmaram Vidya Kshetram and Newcastle University.

The University of Birmingham offers the BPhil as a taught, research-based undergraduate degree in the fields of education and counselling.

== United States ==
In the United States, the term Bachelor of Philosophy refers to an undergraduate bachelor's degree. Frequently, the degree is either research-based or involves additional academic components, (e.g. independent study, interdisciplinary study, foreign language requirements, etc.), as is the case at Baylor University. At Pennsylvania State University, the BPhil program enables students to plan their own academic programs in conjunction with a faculty preceptor. At University of Pittsburgh Honors College, BPhil candidates must pass oral examinations of a senior thesis. Northwestern University's School of Professional Studies offers a number of part-time BPhil degree programs in variety of humanities and social science fields.

=== Former ===
The Sheffield Scientific School of Yale University offered the PhB degree from 1852 to 1931. Over 8,000 such degrees were awarded during this time period, with the course of study lasting three years.

In 1948 the University of Chicago offered a PhB which differed from the BA in that it required two fewer non-required courses. The degree was offered by the college as part of the Hutchins program that allowed students to matriculate after two years of high school.

At Miami University's Western College Program, BPhil candidates participated in a residential program, worked with faculty to design individualized majors, and produced a thesis. The program was ended in 2007.

=== Catholic Seminaries ===
The Bachelor of Philosophy degree is often awarded by Catholic seminaries in the United States to matriculating students who have already achieved an undergraduate degree. These students are usually in the discipleship stage of formation for two years, taking the 30 philosophy credits required for the degree. At the end of this stage, the seminarian usually then pursues a Master of Divinity, Baccalaureate in Sacred Theology, and/or a Master of Arts. Examples of seminaries that award this degree are:

- St. John's Seminary, Massachusetts
- Catholic University of America
- Pontifical College Josephinum
