= Maliha Zulfacar =

Afghan diplomat and academic (born 1961)

Afghanistan Ambassador to Germany
- In office 2006–2010

Personal details
- Born: 1961 (age 64–65) Kabul, Kabul, Afghanistan
- Education: Western College for Women; University of Cincinnati; Paderborn University

Maliha Zulfacar (born 1961) is an Afghan university professor and was the ambassador of Afghanistan to Germany from 2006 to 2010.

== Early life ==
Zulfacar was born in 1961 in Kabul, the capital of Afghanistan. Her father was a diplomat. After completing her school education, she moved to Germany and attended the Braunschweig University of Technology. She did her B.A., M.A. and PhD in sociology from Western College for Women, University of Cincinnati and Paderborn University respectively.

== Career ==
Zulfacar taught sociology at the Kabul University till 1979. She left the country following the Soviet invasion and settled in Germany for a brief period before moving to the United States. In the US, she joined the faculty of California Polytechnic State University. She has also served as the director of the American Institute of Afghanistan Studies and her book Afghan Immigrants in the USA and Germany was published in 1998. After returning to Afghanistan in 2001, Zulfacar participated in the 2002 loya jirga to elect the transitional administration. In November 2006, she was appointed the ambassador of Afghanistan to Germany, a post she held until 2010. She has also produced and directed two documentaries on life in Afghanistan.
