= Peabody Hall (Miami University) =

Historic building in Oxford, Ohio, U.S.

Coordinates: 39°30′05″N 84°43′33″W

- U.S. National Register of Historic Places
- U.S. Historic district – Contributing property
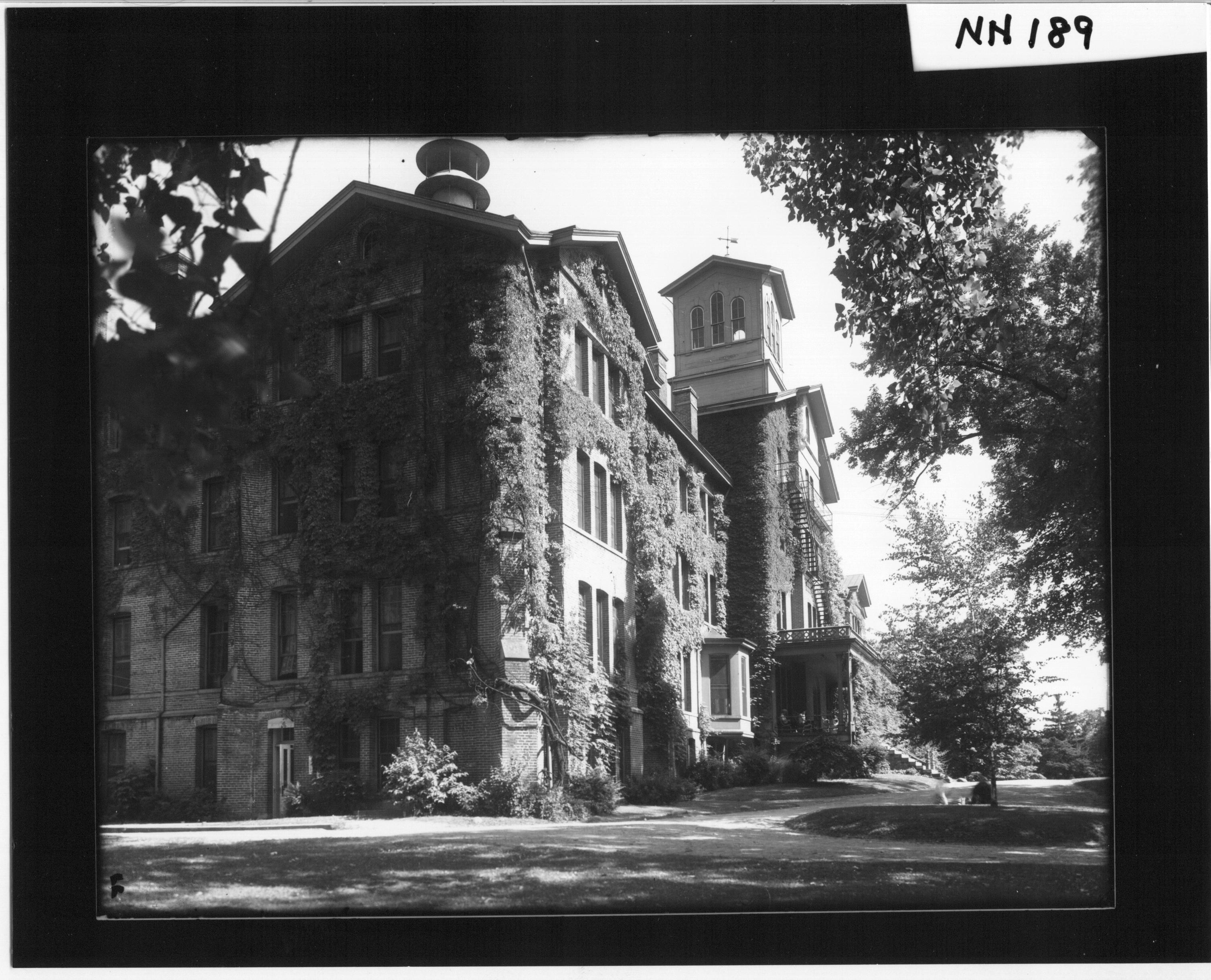
- A view of Peabody Hall from the northwest, date unknown.

- Location within Ohio
- Location: US 27 and OH 73, Miami University (Western Campus), Oxford, Ohio
- Built: 1871
- Architectural style: Georgian
- NRHP reference No.: 09000083
- Added to NRHP: September 17, 1979

Peabody Hall is a mixed-use academic and residential building located on the campus of Miami University in Oxford, Ohio. The original building, known as Seminary Hall, was built in 1855, and was the central building of Western College for Women. That building burned down in 1860 and was rebuilt the following year, only to become damaged by an 1871 fire. The building was rebuilt again that same year, and was renamed Peabody Hall (after Helen Peabody, the first head of Western College) in 1905. Peabody Hall is one of two residential buildings on Miami's Western Campus still used for their original purposes. It is one of 15 contributing buildings to the Western Female Seminary National Historic District.

== History ==
Peabody Hall is located on Western College of Miami's campus. Western College was founded in 1853 and it modeled the Mt. Holyoke of Massachusetts “system” with its low cost yet high-quality education for women. Helen Peabody, for whom Peabody Hall is named, was principal of the Western Female Seminary when it opened for classes on September 20 of 1855. In 1904 Western went from being named A College and Seminary for Women to “The Western College for Women.” From the Western College Memorial Archives website, it states that “For the next fifty years, Western remained a general liberal arts college, primarily under the presidency of William W. Boyd. With the arrival of President Herrick B. Young in 1954, an international focus began. Many international students and faculty were recruited, international travel seminars were instituted, and a global emphasis was added to the curriculum.” Another major decision for the college came in 1971 was men were admitted to Western college as well. Due to financial difficulties, Western College closed in 1974 and the physical facilities merged with Miami University, thus where it stands today. In this year of the Miami University-Western College merger, Peabody was remodeled. Peabody Hall burnt down in 1861, was rebuilt, then burnt down once again in 1871, and was once again rebuilt. A declaration for “Present Properties Needing Change or Improvement was obtained from an unknown source and author from the Western College Memorial Archives. One of the buildings that addressed a plea to improve the buildings safety was Peabody. The short document quotes, “It is a large, dignified structure of high ceilings and wide halls, with an atmosphere which it is desirable to preserve. However, it is not a fireproof building; students are forced to climb its high flights of stairs several times a day—a situation not often conducive to the physical well-being of all young women. And so even though parts of the building can continue, with alteration, to serve admirably for administrative and academic purposes, it is no longer suitable for dormitory use. The elimination of the housing use of Peabody Hall will necessitate the erection of new dormitory facilities.”

== Helen Peabody ==
From the Western College Memorial Archives, “Helen Peabody was born in New Hampshire in 1826. She was the youngest of fourteen children. Helen Peabody graduated from Mount Holyoke in 1848 and remained as a teacher for five years. She moved to St. Louis to be with her brother; however, in 1855 she was encouraged to become the first principal of the Western Female Seminary. Having been a student of Mary Lyon, the founder of Mount Holyoke, Miss Peabody was qualified to establish a "Mount Holyoke in the West." She was principal from 1855 to 1887 when she took a leave of absence for a year. She presided over the 1888 commencement and announced her retirement after thirty-seven years at Western. Miss Peabody moved to California where she died in 1905.” She is buried in the Oxford Cemetery.

== Peabody today ==
Today, Peabody Hall is only one of the three buildings once used to house students of Western still housing classrooms and offices. Along with administrative offices in the building lies a theatre where children and adult plays were once presented. Student rooms and utilities are all modern and the parlors and guest rooms are furnished with 19th-century antiques. In 1996 an article was released in The Cincinnati Enquirer discussing that the renovation of the 125 –year-old hall was nearly complete. The renovation was a $7 million project. The article goes on to describe how although the building looks as if something from a Dickens novel on the outside, the inside now models everything of the 21st century with its new rooms carved out, a computer room and video production studio added, and most room being hard-wired to a computer network. But to still keep some of the building's character from the 1800s when it was only a part of Western College, designers pick particular paint colors and wallpapers to achieve the historical accuracy. In this year the “new Peabody” also developed a renovated Leonard Theatre, the Windate Writing Center and the Western College Alumni Association Memorial Archives. To this day, witnesses of Peabody Hall claim the building is haunted. Workers on site during the renovation claim that they saw the “ghost” of Helen Peabody. Today, Peabody Hall still makes in the list of the most haunted buildings on Miami University's campus.
