= Nancy Barr Mavity =

American crime mystery writer

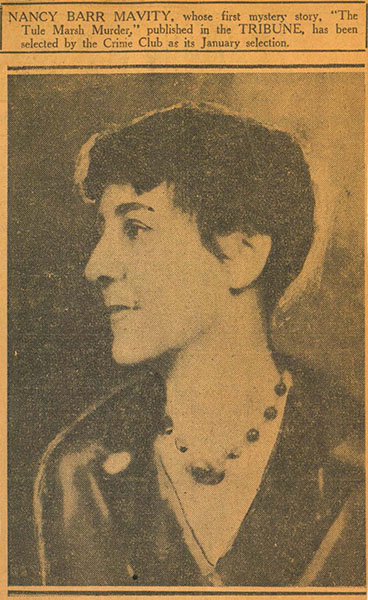
Nancy Barr Mavity

Nann "Nancy" Barr Mavity (October 22, 1890 – April 23, 1959) was an American crime mystery author.

== Early life ==
Nann "Nancy" Clark Barr was born on October 22, 1890, in Lawrenceville, Illinois, the daughter of Dr. Granville Walter Barr and Annabelle Applegate.

The family moved to Keokuk, Iowa, where his father was the City Editor of The Gate City.

She obtained an A. B. at Western College for Women, attended graduate school at Wellesley College, and obtained an A. M. and a Ph.D. in Philosophy from Cornell University. At Cornell she was awarded the Susan Linn Sage Graduate Scholarships in Philosophy.

== Career ==
After college, Nancy Barr Mavity taught philosophy at Connecticut College, New London, Connecticut.

She was a newspaper woman. She was a feature writer of the Oakland Tribune since 1924. In this capacity, she was the first woman to spend a night in Folsom State Prison, where she had gone to cover the pardon hearing of Warren K Billings. She lectured extensively and contributed to magazines.

She did considerable work in New York City and was a Literary Editor of the San Francisco Chronicle. She wrote two articles for Harper's Magazine about working women: The two-income family (December 1951 issue) and The wife, the home, and the job (July 1926 issue)

She is the author of Hazard (an autobiographical novel), A Dinner of Herbs (a volume of poetry dedicated to her daughter), Responsible Citizenship (1923) (a textbook on American politics), Shirley, The Dangerous Road, The Modern Newspaper (1930) (a history of newspaper journalism), Sister Aimee (1931) (a biography of Aimee Semple MacPherson), The State Versus Elna Jepson (1937) (a courtroom drama).

She is the author of a series of mystery novels about crime reporter James Aloysius "Peter" Piper: The Tule Marsh Murder (1929), The Body on the Floor (1929), The Other Bullet (1930), The Case of the Missing Sandals (1930), The Man Who Didn't Mind Hanging (1932), The Fate of Jane McKenzie (1933).

She was a member of P. E. N. Club, National Woman's Party, Phi Beta Kappa Society.

== Personal life ==
On December 25, 1917, Nancy Barr married Arthur Benton Mavity (died in 1931) and they had two children: Nancy and John Barr.

The family moved to California in 1919 and lived at Oakland, California.

After the death of Arthur Benton Mavity in 1931, Nancy Barr married photographer Edward Almon "Doc" Rogers.

Nancy Barr Mavity died on April 23, 1959, of a heart attack at her home in Piedmont, California.
