= Kumler Chapel =

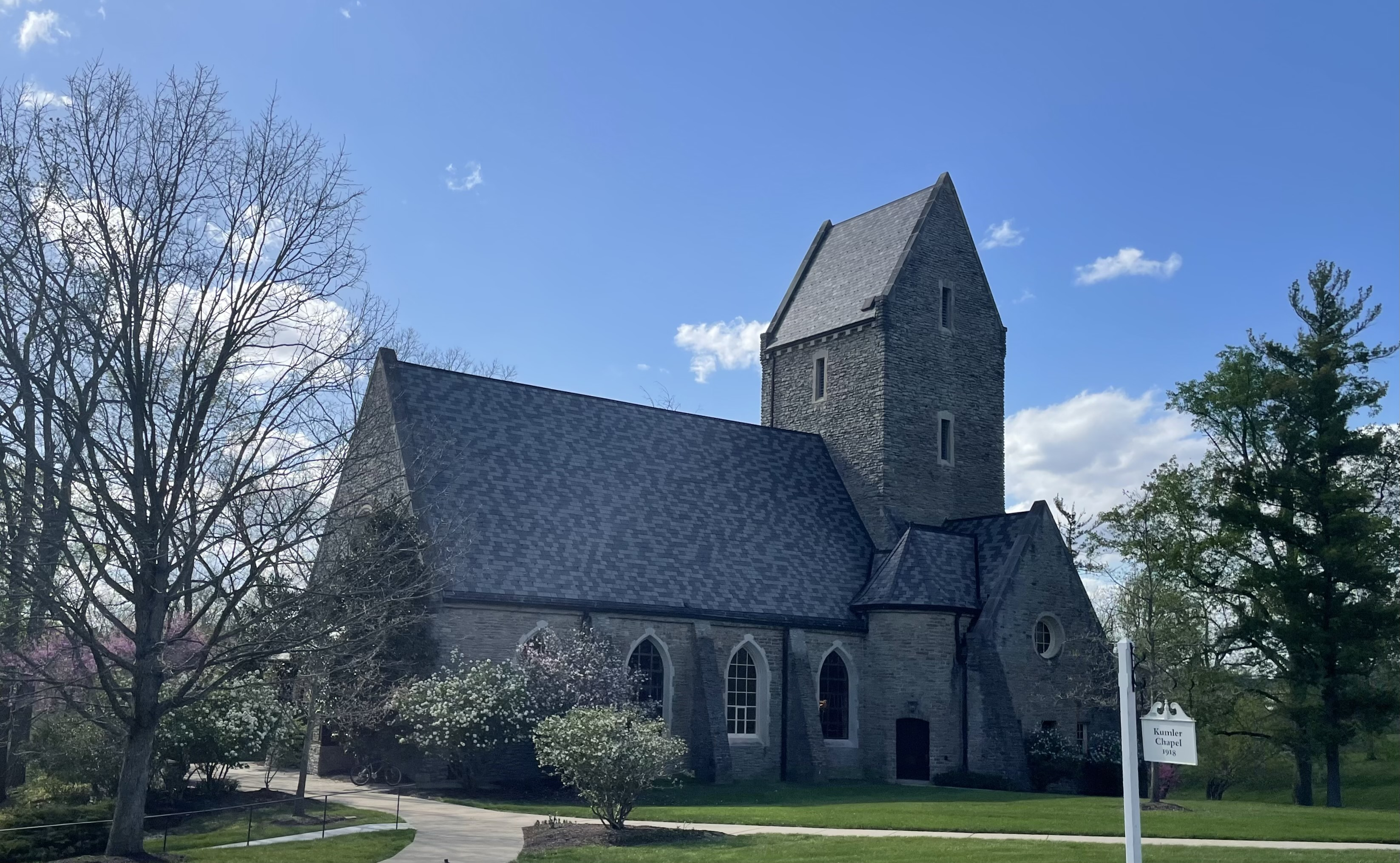
- Kumler Chapel in 2022

- Location within Ohio

General information
- Type: chapel
- Architectural style: Transitional Gothic
- Location: Oxford, OH, Oxford, United States
- Coordinates: 39°30′08.10″N 84°43′34.98″W
- Current tenants: Miami University
- Construction started: 1917
- Completed: September 1918
- Opened: November 28, 1918
- Cost: Unknown
- Owner: Miami University

Technical details
- Lifts/elevators: none

Design and construction
- Architect: Thomas Hastings

Other information
- Seating type: pews

Kumler Chapel is a building of architectural interest located on the Western Campus for Miami University in Oxford, Ohio. It was built in 1917-18 for what was then the Western College for Women by the architect Thomas Hastings, in a "Transitional Gothic" style with both Gothic and Romanesque influences. It is now a venue for church services and weddings.

== History ==
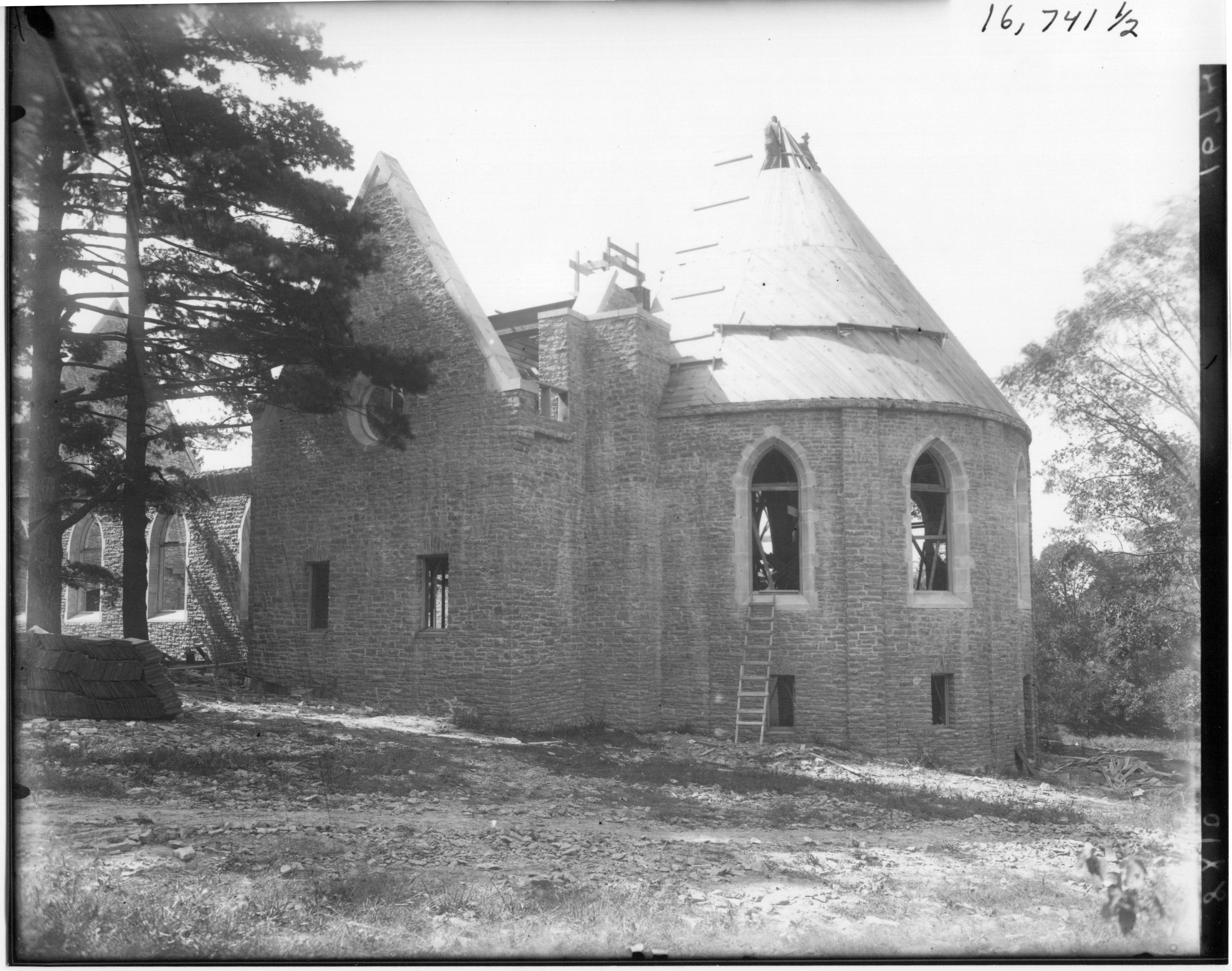
Kumler Chapel under construction in 1917.

Kumler Chapel was constructed beginning in 1917, suffered from a structural collapse, and was then rebuilt beginning in June and completed in September 1918. Kumler Chapel was built on the Western College for Women campus, which is now a part of the Western Campus for Miami University in Oxford, Ohio. Kumler Chapel replaced an older chapel. The building was built due to the beneficence of Mrs. Anna Kumler Wright, an alumna of Western College for Women, and her sister Ella Kumler McKelvy, also an alumna of Western College for Women. The sisters decided to have Kumler Chapel built in honor of their parents: their father, Reverend J.P.E. Kumler and their mother, Mrs. Abbie Goulding Kumler.

Kumler Chapel was originally dedicated on November 10, 1916 yet it was not finished being built until September 1918. November 28, 1918 became the official Dedication Day for Kumler Chapel; this site was completed and a piece of ivy was removed from a neighboring building, Peabody, and was attached to the east side of Kumler Chapel. The building’s arch and mortar collapsed on February 26, 1918 at 4:20pm. This collapse was a major setback for the construction of Kumler Chapel. The cost of Kumler Chapel was never revealed, and the total cost was divided between the Kumler sisters as well as the architect, Thomas Hastings of New York.

The chapel was originally used for church services, baccalaureates, and convocation for the Western College for Women. During the 1970s, two Chapel Interns were appointed from among the seminary students to assist in developing the religious life of Western College for Women. The two interns were to be one man and one woman who were not married. These interns helped develop the use of the chapel for weddings and other activities.

== Architecture ==
Noted architect Thomas Hastings, formerly of Carrère and Hastings, designed Kumler Chapel inspired by both the Gothic and Romanesque, called “Transitional Gothic.” His inspiration for Kumler Chapel came from Église Saint-Pierre, a church in Bazouches-au-Houlme, Normandy. The outside of Kumler Chapel is built with Fieldstone laid in a fishbone pattern which comes from the original church in Normandy, which dates back to the 9th Century.

The windows of Kumler Chapel are extremely important and possess great meaning. They are Gothic pointed arches with the absence of tracery; this style dates back to the Romanesque period. The windows were originally designed for a chapel by Montague Castle-London Company of New York, and then brought to Oxford. There are three main windows: the one in the center is a display of Christ; below him are Mary, Martha, and Mary Magdelene with an inscription underneath that reads: “But His teaching Christ brought the meaning of true womanhood to every woman of every nation and every home.” This window was dedicated to Jeremiah P.E. Kumler, D.D. The west window represented the Old Testament incidents of Prophetess Deborah with listeners. This window was dedicated to Elias Kumler. The east window represented the New Testament and displayed love expressed through Christ. This window was dedicated to Abagail Goulding Kumler. All windows in Kumler Chapel are plain glass except for two, which are rose glass.

The interior is dark, heavy wood, which is to create a solemn and peaceful atmosphere. There are heavy beams in the ceiling on the interior. The exterior was built with grey fieldstone, from nine native fieldstone, which was laid in a fishbone pattern.

An architectural specialty of Kumler Chapel is the alignment of the ridgepole of the tower roof. It is at the right angles to that of the nave roof whereas ridgepoles are usually parallel.

== Weddings and events ==
Kumler Chapel is now used for various events such as weddings and church services, as well as ceremonies for Miami's student organizations and Greek life.
