= Oxford, Ohio =

City in Ohio, US

- City
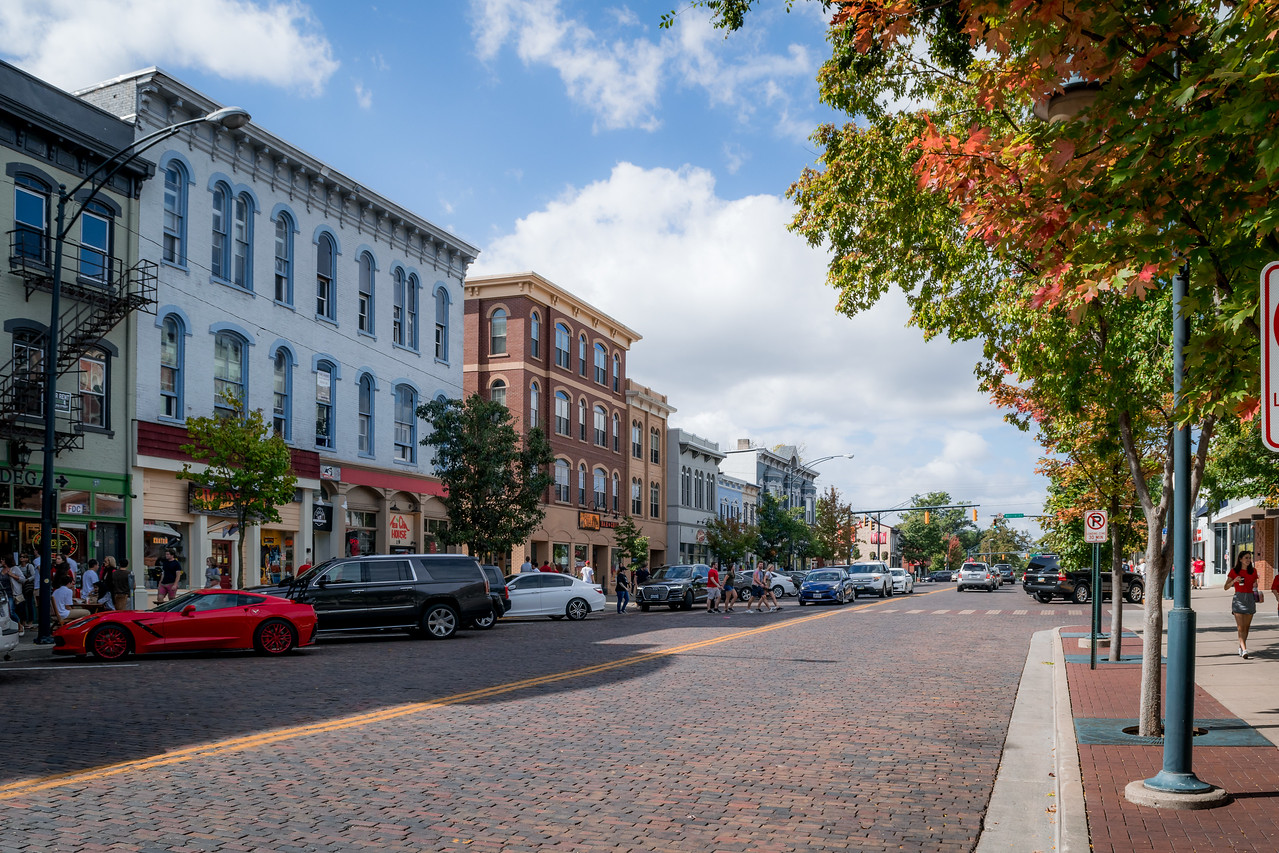
- High Street in uptown Oxford

- Flag
- Motto: "Home of Miami University"
- Interactive map of Oxford, Ohio
- Location within Ohio Location within the United States
- Coordinates: 39°30′27″N 84°44′48″W
- Country: United States
- State: Ohio
- County: Butler
- Townships: Oxford
- Platted: March 29, 1810
- Named for: Oxford, England

Government
  - Type: Council–manager
  - Mayor: William B. Snavely
  - City Manager: Douglas R. Elliott, Jr.

Area
  - Total: 7.78 sq mi (20.15 km^{2})
  - Land: 7.78 sq mi (20.14 km^{2})
  - Water: 0.0039 sq mi (0.01 km^{2})
- Elevation: 912 ft (278 m)

Population (2020)
  - Total: 23,035
  - Density: 2,963/sq mi (1,143.9/km^{2})
- Time zone: UTC-05:00 (EST)
  - Summer (DST): UTC-04:00 (EDT)
- ZIP code: 45056
- Area code: 513
- FIPS code: 39-59234
- GNIS feature ID: 2396116
- Website: www.cityofoxford.org

Oxford is a city in Butler County, Ohio, United States. The population was 23,035 at the 2020 census. A college town, Oxford was founded in 1810 to serve as the home of Miami University. The city lies in southwestern Ohio roughly 4 miles (6.4 km) from the Indiana–Ohio border, approximately 30 miles (48 km) northwest of Cincinnati and 35 miles (56 km) southwest of Dayton.

== History ==
Oxford lies within the Congress Lands West of Miami River. In 1803, the United States Congress granted one township to the Ohio General Assembly in the region to build a college. The Ohio Legislature selected a township off Four Mile Creek, the College Township, and chartered Miami University in 1809.

Oxford was laid out by James Heaton on March 29, 1810, by an order of the Ohio General Assembly on February 6, 1810. It was established in Range 1 East, Town 5 North of the Congress Lands in the southeast quarter of Section 22, the southwest corner of Section 23, the northwest corner of Section 26, and the northeast corner of Section 27. It was named for Oxford, England, home to the University of Oxford. The original village, consisting of 128 lots, was incorporated on February 23, 1830.

Freedom Summer, a civil rights campaign, started with orientations at Western College for Women in June 1964. This event is commemorated near the Kumler Chapel on the Western campus, now a part of Miami University. Oxford was elevated to city status in 1971 and became a qualified Tree City USA as recognized by the National Arbor Day Foundation in 1996.

== Geography ==
According to the United States Census Bureau, the city has a total area of 6.68 square miles (17.30 km^{2}), all land. The city lies along Four Mile Creek, which passes through the Miami University campus. Oxford is a part of Oxford Township, originally called the College Township.

== Demographics ==
Historical population
Census	Pop.	Note	%±
1820	258		—
1830	737		185.7%
1850	1,111		—
1860	1,839		65.5%
1870	1,738		−5.5%
1880	1,743		0.3%
1890	1,922		10.3%
1900	2,009		4.5%
1910	2,017		0.4%
1920	2,146		6.4%
1930	2,588		20.6%
1940	2,756		6.5%
1950	6,944		152.0%
1960	7,828		12.7%
1970	15,868		102.7%
1980	17,655		11.3%
1990	19,013		7.7%
2000	21,943		15.4%
2010	21,371		−2.6%
2020	23,035		7.8%

=== 2020 census ===
As of the 2020 census, Oxford had a population of 23,035. The median age was 21.2 years; 7.8% of residents were under the age of 18 and 6.6% of residents were 65 years of age or older. For every 100 females there were 99.8 males, and for every 100 females age 18 and over there were 99.0 males age 18 and over.

There were 6,309 households in Oxford, of which 15.8% had children under the age of 18 living in them. Of all households, 22.0% were married couples living together, 35.2% were households with a male householder and no spouse or partner present, and 37.5% were households with a female householder and no spouse or partner present. About 34.8% of all households were made up of individuals and 8.1% had someone living alone who was 65 years of age or older.

There were 7,187 housing units, of which 12.2% were vacant. The homeowner vacancy rate was 1.8% and the rental vacancy rate was 10.0%.

99.9% of residents lived in urban areas, while 0.1% lived in rural areas.

Racial composition as of the 2020 census
Race	Number	Percent
White	18,326	79.6%
Black or African American	1,147	5.0%
American Indian and Alaska Native	46	0.2%
Asian	2,036	8.8%
Native Hawaiian and Other Pacific Islander	4	0.0%
Some other race	285	1.2%
Two or more races	1,191	5.2%
Hispanic or Latino (of any race)	920	4.0%

=== 2010 census ===
As of the census of 2010, there were 21,371 people, 5,799 households, and 1,909 families living in the city. The population density was 3,199.3 inhabitants per square mile (1,235.3/km^{2}). There were 6,622 housing units at an average density of 991.3 per square mile (382.7/km^{2}). The racial makeup of the city was 87.6% White, 4.0% African American, 0.2% Native American, 5.4% Asian, 0.6% from other races, and 2.2% from two or more races. Hispanic or Latino residents of any race were 2.3% of the population.

There were 5,799 households, of which 14.4% had children under the age of 18 living with them, 24.6% were married couples living together, 6.1% had a female householder with no husband present, 2.2% had a male householder with no wife present, and 67.1% were non-families. 33.7% of all households were made up of individuals, and 6.8% had someone living alone who was 65 years of age or older. The average household size was 2.40 and the average family size was 2.78.

The median age in the city was 21.4 years. 6.8% of residents were under the age of 18; 67.9% were between the ages of 18 and 24; 10.9% were from 25 to 44; 8.8% were from 45 to 64; and 5.6% were 65 years of age or older. The gender makeup of the city was 47.6% male and 52.4% female.

=== 2000 census ===
As of the census of 2000, there were 21,943 people, 5,870 households, and 2,066 families living in the city. The population density was 3,734.4 inhabitants per square mile (1,441.9/km^{2}). There were 6,134 housing units at an average density of 1,043.9 per square mile (403.1/km^{2}). The racial makeup of the city was 91.2% White, 4.3% African American, 0.2% Native American, 2.4% Asian, <0.1% Pacific Islander, 0.5% from other races, and 1.4% from two or more races. Hispanic or Latino residents of any race were 1.44% of the population.

There were 5,870 households, out of which 16.5% had children under the age of 18 living with them, 26.8% were married couples living together, 6.4% had a female householder with no husband present, and 64.8% were non-families. 32.0% of all households were made up of individuals, and 5.5% had someone living alone who was 65 years of age or older. The average household size was 2.43 and the average family size was 2.85.

In the city, 8.3% of the population was under the age of 18, 66.8% was from 18 to 24, 11.7% from 25 to 44, 8.4% from 45 to 64, and 4.8% was 65 years of age or older. The median age was 21 years. For every 100 females, there were 87.8 males. For every 100 females age 18 and over, there were 87.1 males.

The median income for a household in the city was $25,164, and the median income for a family was $52,589. Males had a median income of $35,833 versus $24,637 for females. The per capita income for the city was $12,165. About 13.4% of families and 43.7% of the population were below the poverty line, including 18.8% of those under age 18 and 8.1% of those age 65 or over.

== Arts and culture ==
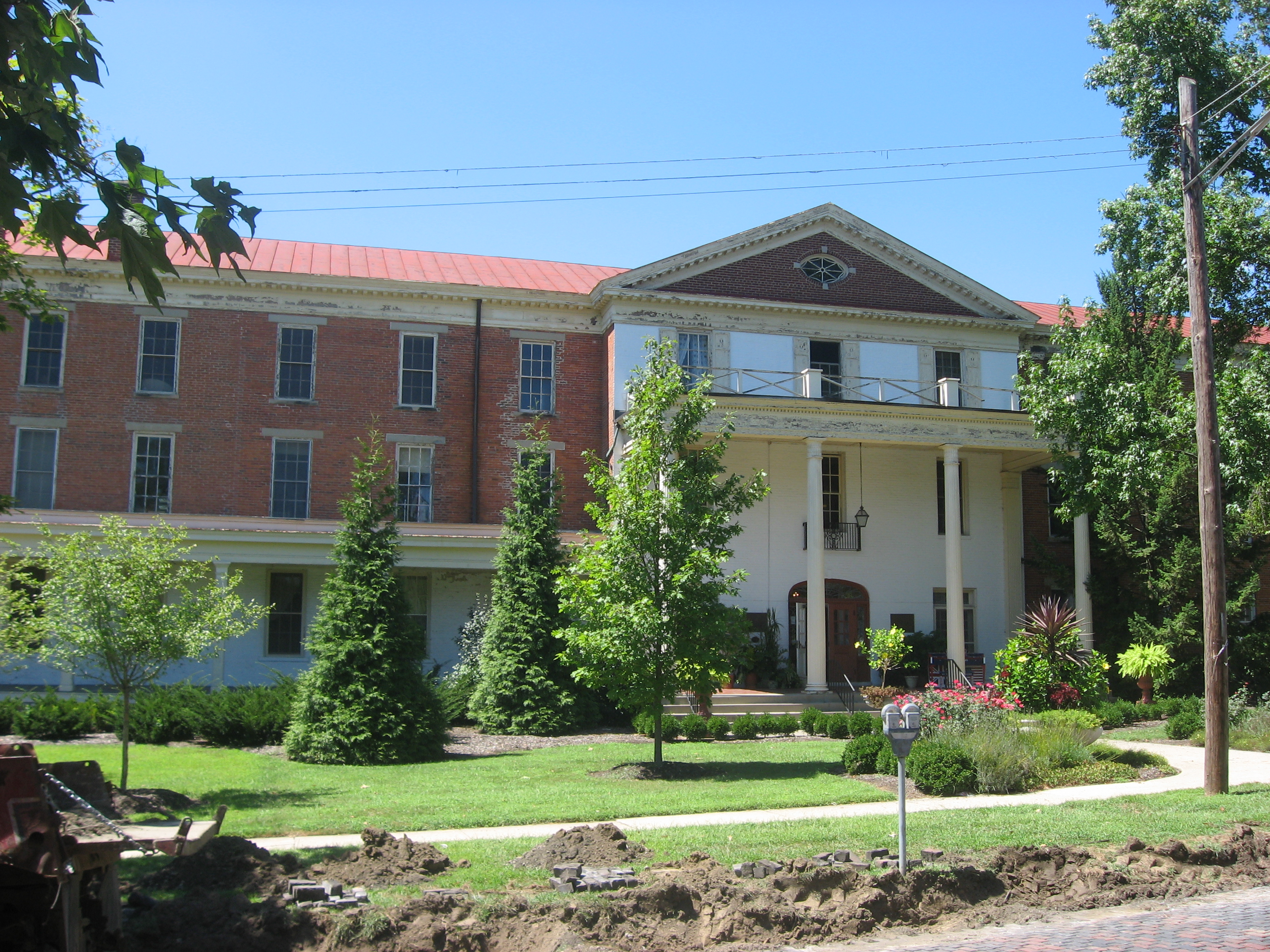
The Oxford Community Arts Center is housed in the former Oxford Female Institute.

Annual festivals and performances in Oxford include Oxtoberfest, the four-month Uptown Music Concerts series, the summer Oxford Wine Festival, and numerous lectures and live performances at Miami University.

The Oxford Community Arts Center (OCAC) is a performing arts facility in Oxford. Its annual events include the Chocolate Meltdown in January. The OCAC building was built for the Oxford Female Institute in 1849, then became the Oxford College for Women in 1906 after the Oxford Female Institute merged with the Oxford Female College. After the closing of the school in 1928, Miami University bought the building for use as a residence hall before its facilities were repurposed for the OCAC.

Museums in the city include the Robert A. Hefner Museum of Natural History, the Karl Limper Geology Museum, the William Holmes McGuffey Museum, and the Richard and Carole Cocks Art Museum. Oxford has a public library, a branch of the Lane Libraries.

== Parks and recreation ==
The Miami University Natural Areas has over 17 miles of hiking trails throughout Oxford. Hikers can hike through the Silvoor Biology Sanctuary and up to the bluffs, or through the 100 acre Western Woods to enjoy a "magnificent stand of oaks, beech and maples".

== Education ==
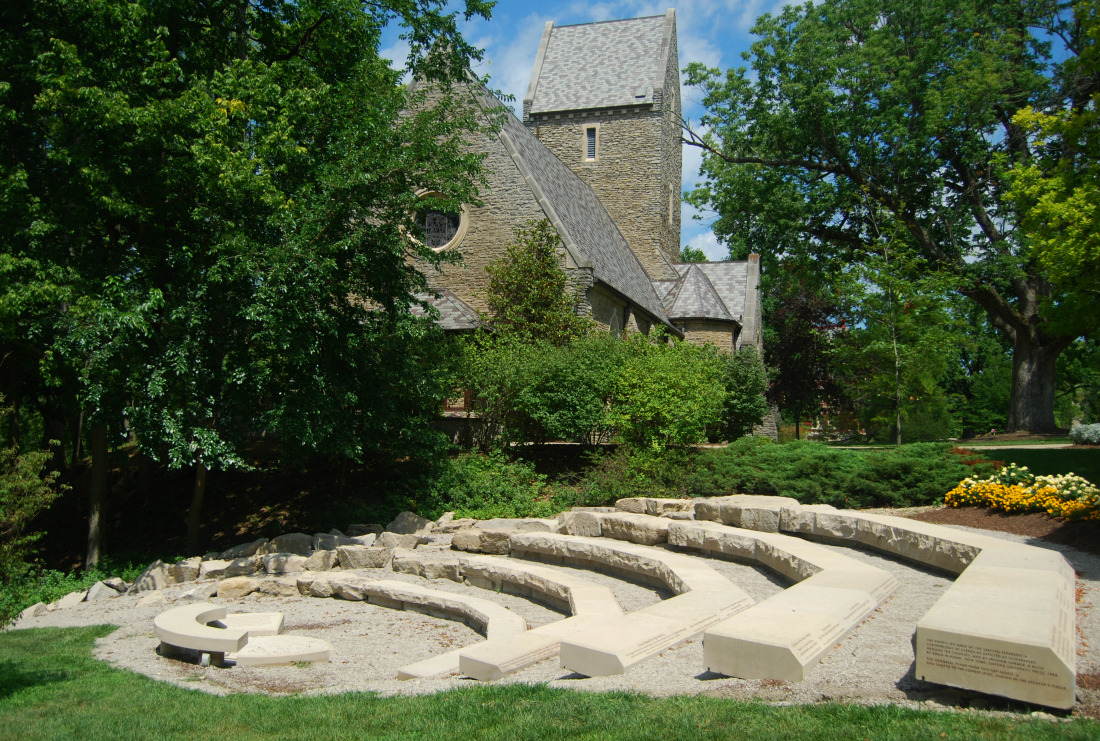
Stone memorial for Freedom Summer at Kumler Chapel

Miami University, a major public research institution with approximately 20,000 students, has long been the largest and most prominent institution of higher education in Oxford, around which the city developed.

Historically, Western College for Women operated in Oxford from 1853 to 1974, initially as a seminary and later as a liberal arts college before merging with Miami University in 1974. Oxford College for Women was founded in 1867 through the federation of the former Oxford Female Institute and Oxford Female College. It was incorporated into Miami University in 1928; one of its buildings, located on College Avenue, served as a residence hall before its facilities were repurposed as the Oxford Community Arts Center.

Talawanda City School District is the public primary and secondary school district serving Oxford, which includes three elementary schools, one middle school, and Talawanda High School. The McGuffey Montessori School offers grades PK to 8.

== Infrastructure ==
=== Transportation ===
Miami University Airport is located on the western edge of Oxford, two nautical miles (2.3 mi; 3.7 km) west of the city's central business district.

The Butler County Regional Transit Authority provides bus service in the city with connections to Hamilton, Middletown, as well as Springdale, where riders can transfer to the Southwest Ohio Regional Transit Authority serving greater Cincinnati.

== Notable people ==
- Walter Alston, Major League Baseball manager, member of the National Baseball Hall of Fame and Museum
- Bill Bartlett, lead guitarist of The Lemon Pipers, psychedelic/bubblegum pop band, they had a Billboard #1 hit in 1968, "Green Tambourine"
- Jerome Conley, former mayor of Oxford and Dean of Miami University
- Khashyar Darvich, film producer and director
- Sarah Iliff Davis (1820–1909), milliner, business woman, and philanthropist
- John Ward Dunsmore, artist
- David J. Eicher, chief editor of Astronomy magazine and author of publications on astronomy and American History
- Edith Emerson, painter
- Weeb Ewbank, football coach, 3-time World Champion (1958, 1959, 1968), member of Pro Football Hall of Fame
- Earle Foxe, theater and film actor
- Victor Furth, architect
- Kason Gabbard, Major League Baseball pitcher
- Nick Gillespie, libertarian journalist, former editor-in-chief of Reason magazine, current editor of reason.tv
- Caroline Harrison, wife of President Benjamin Harrison
- Russell Benjamin Harrison, son of Benjamin and Caroline Harrison, Indiana politician
- Darrell Hedric, basketball head coach and scout
- Oliver Toussaint Jackson, businessman
- Edgar Stillman Kelley, composer and music educator at Western College for Women
- Lorenzo Lorraine Langstroth, "Father of American Beekeeping"
- Henry MacCracken, educator, chancellor of University of Pittsburgh and New York University
- Samuel Taylor Marshall, attorney and founder of Beta Theta Pi fraternity
- William Holmes McGuffey, educator
- William H. McSurely, Illinois state representative and judge
- Rob Miller, architect
- Maurice Rocco, pianist
- Mike Slusher, basketball player

== Sister cities ==
Differdange, Luxembourg, which is home to the Miami University Dolibois European Center, is a sister city to Oxford. Oxford established a sister city relationship with Dubno, Ukraine, in 2023.
