= Miami University Voice of America Learning Center =

Campus of Miami University in West Chester, Ohio, US

- Type: Public satellite campus
- Established: January 2009
- Parent institution: Miami University
- Provost: Elizabeth R. Mullenix
- Dean: Ande Durojaiye
- Location: West Chester, Ohio, United States; 39.360652°N 84.362962°W,
- Colors: Red and White
- Website: miamioh.edu/regionals/

The Miami University Voice of America Learning Center (Miami VOALC) is a satellite campus of Miami University in West Chester, Ohio. It is one of three regional campuses of Miami University. Founded in 2009, it is located on a portion of the former Voice of America Bethany Relay Station.

== Academics ==
Miami VOALC offers the same degree programs and classes as Miami Middletown and Miami Hamilton. Miami VOALC also hosts Miami's MBA program.
