= Upham Hall =

Upham Hall may refer to:

- Upham Hall (Marycrest College), a contributing property to the Marycrest College Historic District
- Upham Hall (Miami University)
