= Richard and Carole Cocks Art Museum =

- Former name: Miami University Art Museum
- Location: Oxford, Ohio
- Coordinates: 39°30′03″N 84°43′45″W
- Type: Art museum
- Accreditation: American Alliance of Museums
- Director: John "Jack" Green
- Website: miamioh.edu/cca/art-museum/

The Richard and Carole Cocks Art Museum (formerly Miami University Art Museum) is the art museum of Miami University in Oxford, Ohio.

== Building ==
Completed in 1978, the museum was designed by architect Walter Netsch of the firm Skidmore, Owings and Merrill based in Chicago. The building is located on three acres of park land and houses five galleries, containing around 16,000 artworks.

== History ==
The construction of the Richard and Carole Cocks Art Museum was funded by private contributions to Miami University's Goals for Enrichment capital campaign in the mid-1970s. A substantial gift for the building came as a bequest from Miami alumnus Fred C. Yager, class of 1914. Walter I. Farmer, class of 1935, and former Art Department faculty member Orpha B. Webster donated art collections which helped develop an early foundation for the museum.

As of 2021, John "Jack" Green is the director and chief curator of the museum.
