= Alumni Hall (Miami University) =

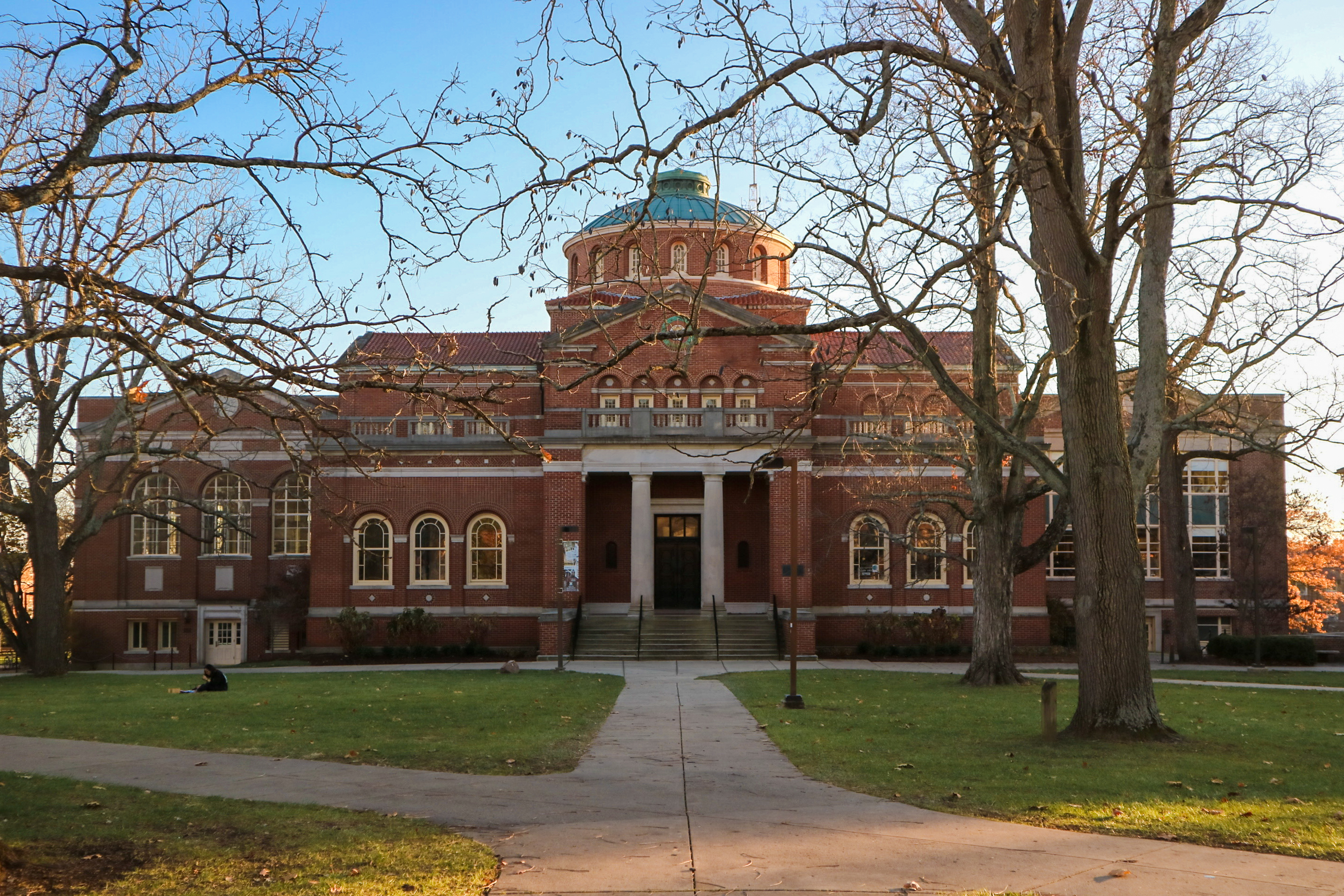
- Alumni Hall at Miami University in 2017

General information
- Architectural style: Lombardic Romanesque
- Location: 350 East Spring Street, Oxford, Ohio 45056
- Coordinates: 39°30′20.5″N 84°44′14.4″W
- Completed: 1910

Technical details
- Floor area: 95,765 sq ft (8,896.9 m^{2})

Design and construction
- Architect: Frank Packard

Alumni Hall, formerly known as Alumni Library, is an academic building at Miami University in Oxford, Ohio. It currently houses the university's Department of Architecture and Interior Design and the Wertz Art and Architecture Library. A Lombardic Romanesque building, Alumni Hall was built in 1910 and was funded by the Carnegie Corporation of New York.

== History ==
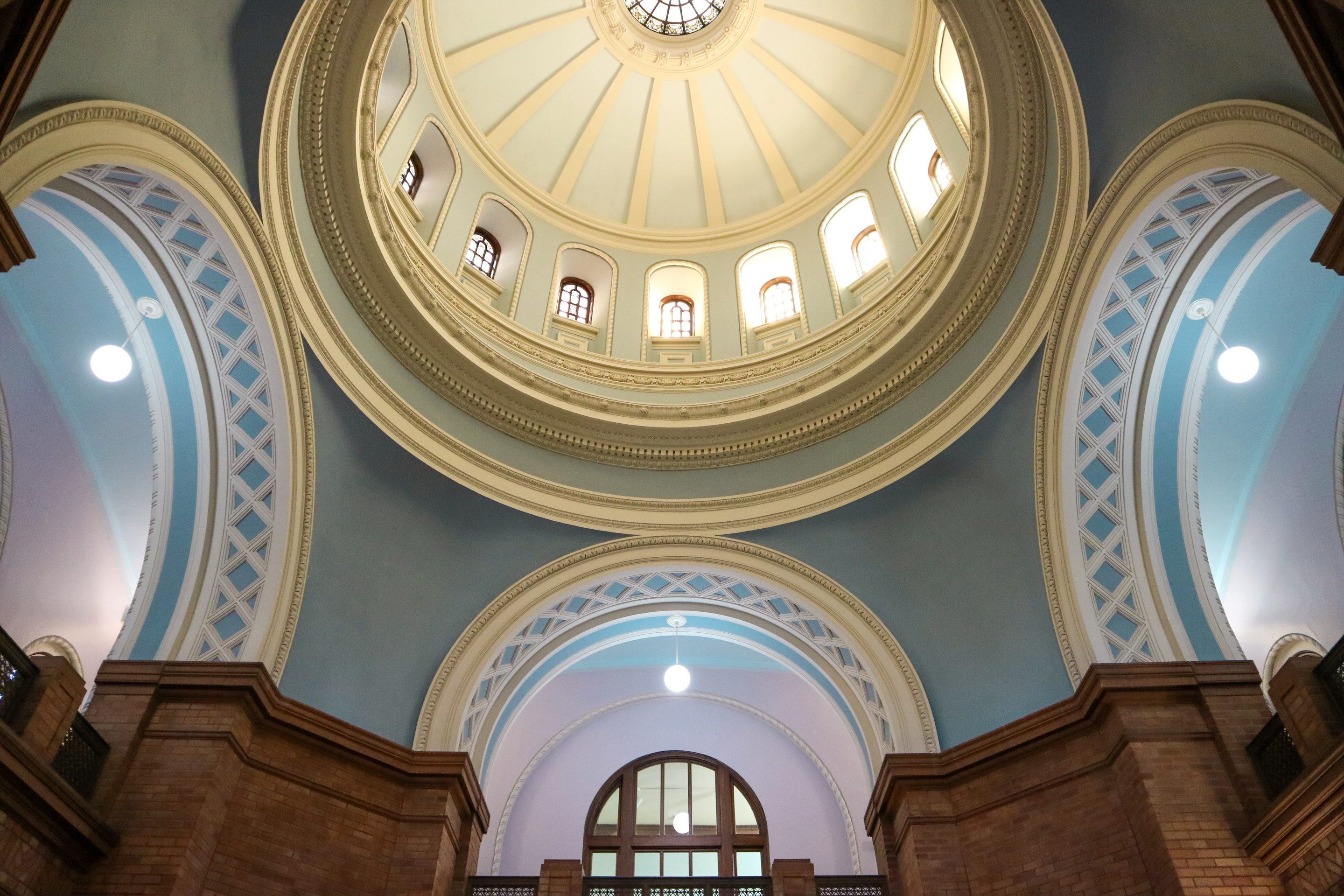
The dome inside Alumni Hall, completed in 1910

The university, founded in 1809, initially housed its library in a room in Old Main, the main building on campus. As time passed and space ran out in Old Main, the university sought a grant from the Andrew Carnegie Corporation to build a new library on campus. On March 13, 1905, Andrew Carnegie offered the university a $40,000 grant if the university could match the amount with its own $40,000 towards the building. In 1908 the university finished raising the money and the building began. Frank Packard from Columbus, Ohio was hired as the architect and construction began in 1909. The building was inspired by Classical Roman architecture and when it opened in 1910, it consisted of a main reading room for 192 people, a periodical room, a few classrooms, faculty rooms a multi-tier stacks for 150,000 volumes.

=== Building extensions ===
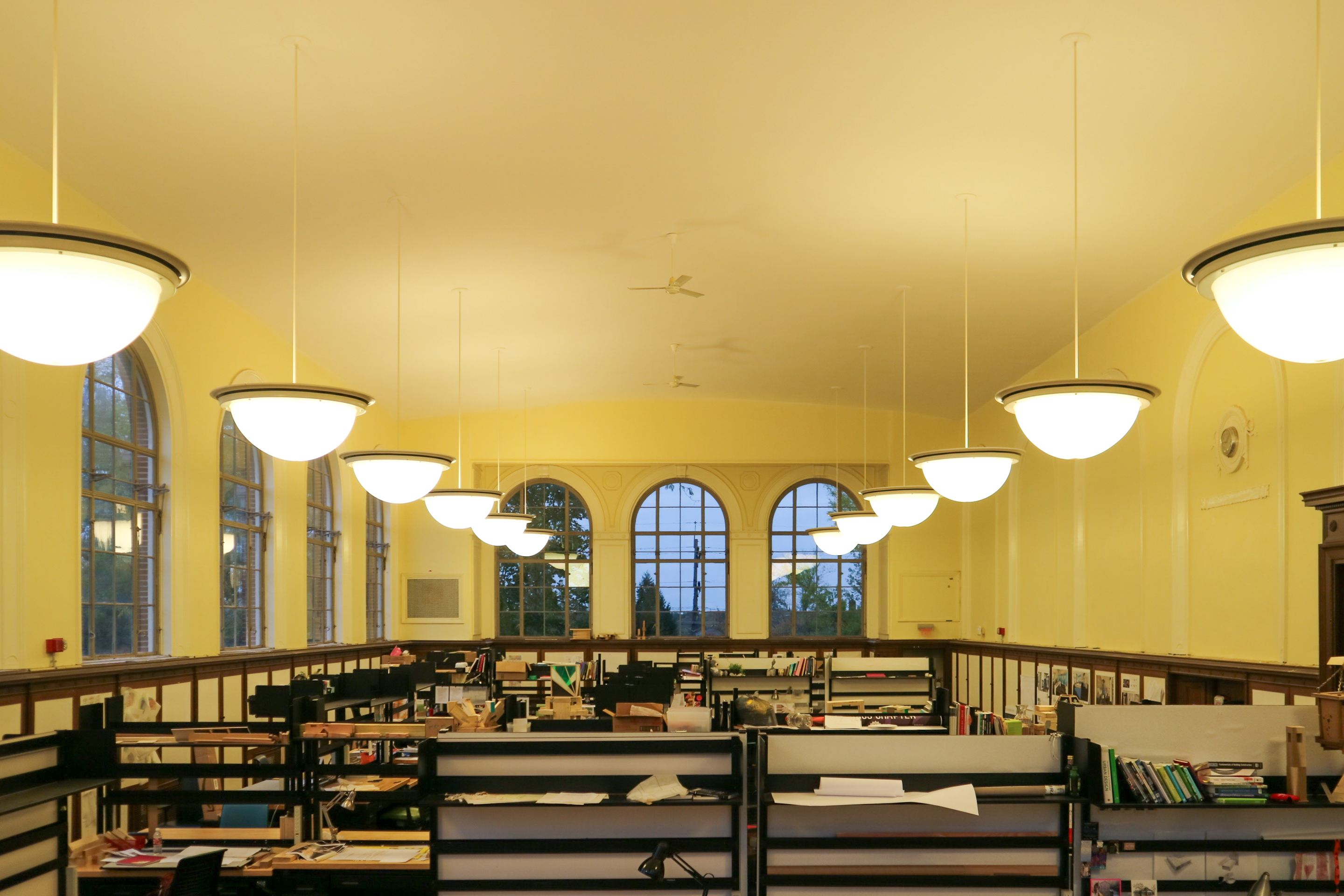
Interior view of the undergraduate architecture studio

By the end of 1911 all the shelf space for the library was full and planning began for an addition to the building. In 1922 funding from the university and the Carnegie Corporation enable an Eastern wing designed by Ralph Ridley to be added to the existing building. This addition included a main reference room, reading room and more stacks.

The next addition that came in 1951 where a West wing was added to the building, thus making it once again symmetrical. Designed by Potter Tyler & Martin this addition was funded by the State of Ohio and added more stacks to the building. At the completion of King Library, the university's current main library, in 1972, the university's Department of Architecture took residence in the building.

In 1997 Thomas H. Beeby was commissioned to do the most recent and extensive renovation of the building. What used to be the main stacks on the southern side of the building was turned into an atrium and a southern wing was added to the building. Today the building houses the Department of Architecture and Interior Design studios, support spaces, offices and the Wertz Art and Architecture Library.

== Miscellaneous ==
A bronze copy of Jean-Antoine Houdon's statue of George Washington located in the rotunda of the Virginia State Capitol stands in the Alumni Hall rotunda. The statue was given to the university in 1920 by Samuel Spahr Laws, Miami class of 1848.

Alumni Hall is also attributed as the inspiration behind Marian Boyd Havighurst's 1934 mystery novel, Murder in the Stacks and sequences from the film Little Man Tate, directed by and starring Jodie Foster, were filmed within the rotunda for Alumni Hall.
