= Miami University =

Public university in Oxford, Ohio, US

- Motto: Prodesse Quam Conspici (Latin)
- Motto in English: "To accomplish without being conspicuous"
- Type: Public research university
- Established: February 2, 1809; 217 years ago
- Parent institution: University System of Ohio
- Accreditation: HLC
- Academic affiliations: SOCHE; Space-grant
- Endowment: $1.09 billion (FY2025)
- President: Gregory Crawford
- Provost: Trent Gould
- Faculty: 1,106 (fall 2023)
- Students: 18,618 (fall 2023)
- Undergraduates: 16,478 (fall 2023)
- Postgraduates: 2,140 (fall 2023)
- Location: Oxford, Ohio, United States; 39.511905°N 84.734674°W
- Campus: 2,138 acres (8.65 km^{2}); Fringe town
- Other campuses: Hamilton; Middletown; West Chester; Differdange
- Newspaper: The Miami Student
- Colors: Red and white
- Nickname: RedHawks
- Sporting affiliations: NCAA Division I FBS – MAC; NCHC; MVC
- Mascot: Swoop the RedHawk
- Website: miamioh.edu

Miami University (informally Miami of Ohio or simply Miami) is a public research university in Oxford, Ohio, United States. Founded in 1809, it is the second-oldest university in Ohio and the tenth-oldest public university in the United States. It is named for its location in the Miami Valley, in turn named after the Myaamia people. The university operates regional campuses in nearby Hamilton, Middletown, and West Chester, as well as the international Dolibois European Center in Differdange, Luxembourg.

Miami University provides a liberal arts education with an emphasis on undergraduate studies. It consists of seven colleges and schools, and enrolls over 18,000 students in Oxford. The campus also includes the Richard and Carole Cocks Art Museum, Karl Limper Geology Museum, and William H. McGuffey House. Miami is a member of the University System of Ohio and is classified among "R2: Doctoral Universities – High research activity".

Miami is known as the "Mother of Fraternities" for the five Greek-letter organizations founded on its campus, and as the "Cradle of Coaches" due to several prominent collegiate and professional sports coaches having started their careers at the school. Miami's athletic teams compete in the NCAA Division I and are collectively known as the Miami RedHawks. They compete in the Mid-American Conference and the National Collegiate Hockey Conference.

Miami University alumni, faculty, and staff have included 1 president of the United States, 16 current and former members of the United States Congress, 5 U.S. ambassadors, 8 governors, 3 Pulitzer Prize winners, 4 Rhodes Scholars, 1 foreign prime minister, and 3 Olympic medalists. The university has more than 220,000 alumni.

== History ==
=== Old Miami (1809–1873) ===
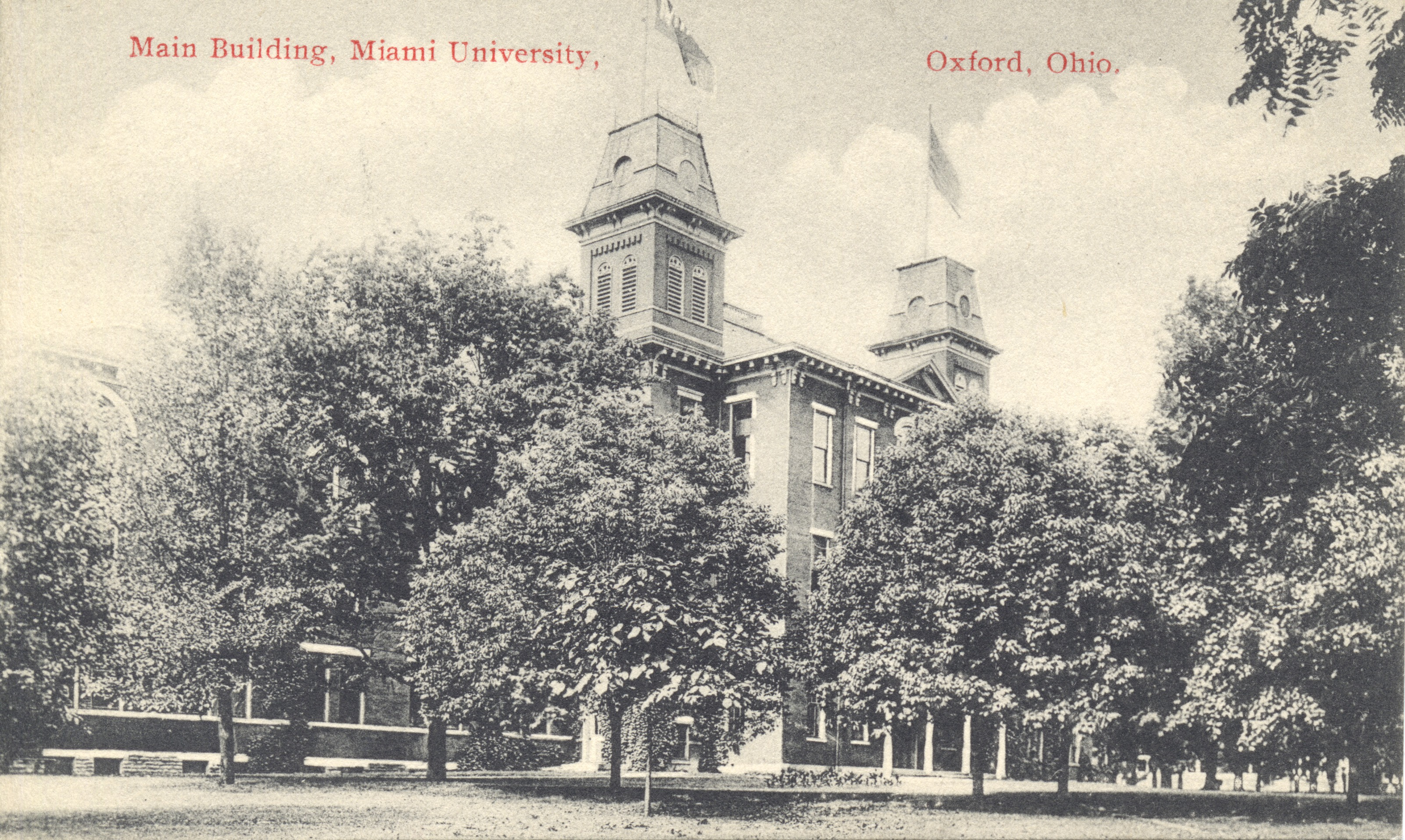
The original Harrison Hall, known as Old Main, was built in 1818 and housed Miami's first classrooms. It was replaced by a new structure in 1959.

The foundations for Miami University were first laid by an Act of Congress signed by President George Washington, stating an academy should be northwest of the Ohio River in the Miami Valley. The land was to be within the Symmes Purchase; landowner John Cleves Symmes purchased it from the government with the stipulation that he set aside land for an academy. Two days after Ohio achieved statehood in 1803, Congress granted one township to the Ohio General Assembly to build a college. Because all the townships within the Symmes Purchase had already been platted by that time, the General Assembly selected a township along Four Mile Creek in the Congress Lands West of Miami River during the summer of 1803. On February 2, 1809, the state legislature passed "An Act to Establish the Miami University", formally creating a board of trustees. Oxford, Ohio, was platted within the College Township in 1810.

The university temporarily halted construction due to the War of 1812. Cincinnati tried—and failed—to move Miami to the city in 1822. Miami created a grammar school in 1818 to teach frontier youth, but it was disbanded after five years. Though financed by means of a government land grant, Miami University initially was inaugurated and operated by Presbyterians, with explicit legislative encouragement for religious education having been enshrined in the Northwest Ordinance. Robert Hamilton Bishop, a Presbyterian minister and professor of history, was appointed to be the first president of Miami University in 1824, stating in his inaugural speech that all teaching at Miami University should be based in the Bible.

The first day of classes at Miami was on November 1, 1824. At its opening, there were 20 students and two faculty members in addition to Bishop. The curriculum included Greek, Latin, algebra, geography, and Roman history; the university offered only a Bachelor of Arts. An "English Scientific Department" was started in 1825, which studied modern languages, applied mathematics, and political economy. It offered a certificate upon completion of coursework instead of a diploma. The school provided public prayers twice a day and required all students to partake in a public worship every Sunday.

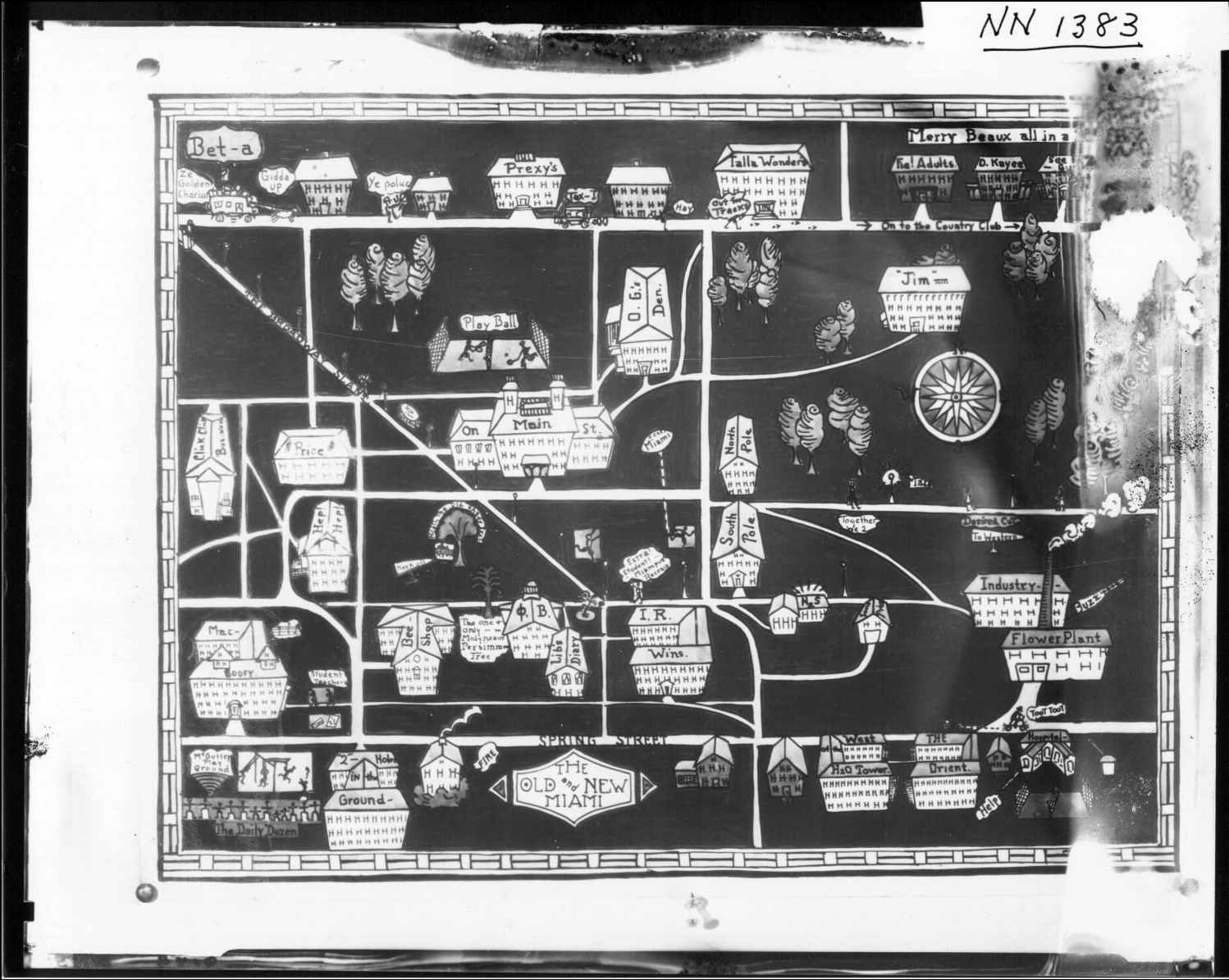
Satirical map of "The Old and New Miami"

Miami students purchased a printing press and in 1827 published their first periodical, The Literary Focus. It promptly failed, but it laid the foundation for the weekly Literary Register. The Miami Student, founded in 1867, traces its foundation back to the Literary Register and claims to be the oldest college newspaper in the United States. A theological department and a farmer's college were formed in 1829; the farmer's college was not an agricultural school, but a three-year education program for farm boys. William Holmes McGuffey joined the faculty in 1826 and began his work on the McGuffey Readers while in Oxford. By 1834 the faculty had grown to seven professors and enrollment was at 234 students. Eleven students were expelled in 1835, including one for firing a pistol at another student. McGuffey resigned and became president of Cincinnati College, where he urged parents not to send their children to Miami.

Alpha Delta Phi opened its chapter at Miami in 1833, making it the first fraternity chapter west of the Allegheny Mountains. In 1839, Beta Theta Pi was created; it was the first fraternity formed at Miami.

In 1839 Old Miami reached its enrollment peak, with 250 students from 13 states; only Harvard, Yale, and Dartmouth were larger. President Bishop was forced to resign by the board of trustees in 1840 due to the failure of his appeals for unity in face of the Old School–New School controversy, which had caused factions to rise against each other trying to take over the university's administration. Old School adherents won out by focusing on his anti-slavery beliefs, lenient disciplinary methods, and an agreement he had struck with the New School Lane Seminary, allowing students of both institutions to learn at the other. He was replaced as president by George Junkin, former president of Lafayette College, a strict Old School adherent with strong anti-Methodist and pro-slavery views; Junkin resigned in 1844, having proved to be unpopular with students. By 1847, enrollment had fallen to 137 students.

Students in 1848 participated in the "Snowball Rebellion". Defying the faculty's stance against fraternities, students packed Old Main, one of Miami's main classrooms and administrative buildings, with snow and reinforced the snow with chairs, benches and desks from the classroom. Those who had participated in the rebellion were expelled from the school and Miami's student population was more than halved. By 1873, enrollment fell further to 87 students. The board of trustees closed the school in 1873 and leased the campus for a grammar school. The period before its closing is referred to as "Old Miami".

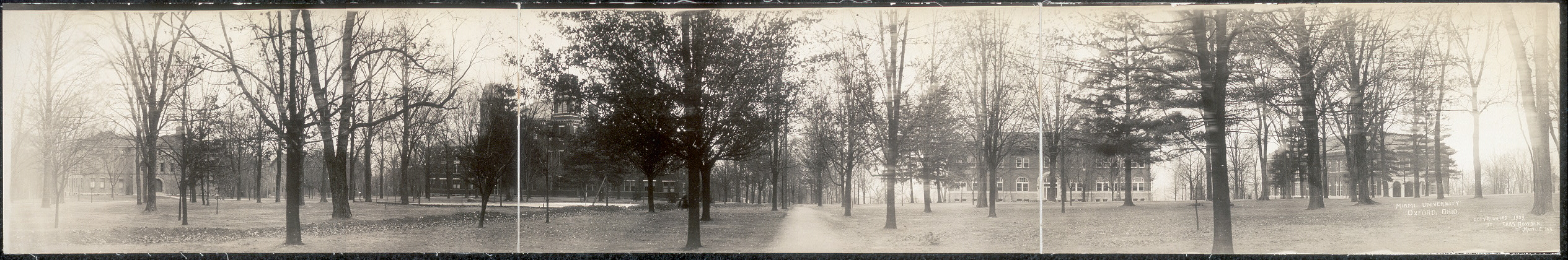
Miami University campus in 1909

=== New Miami (1885–present) ===
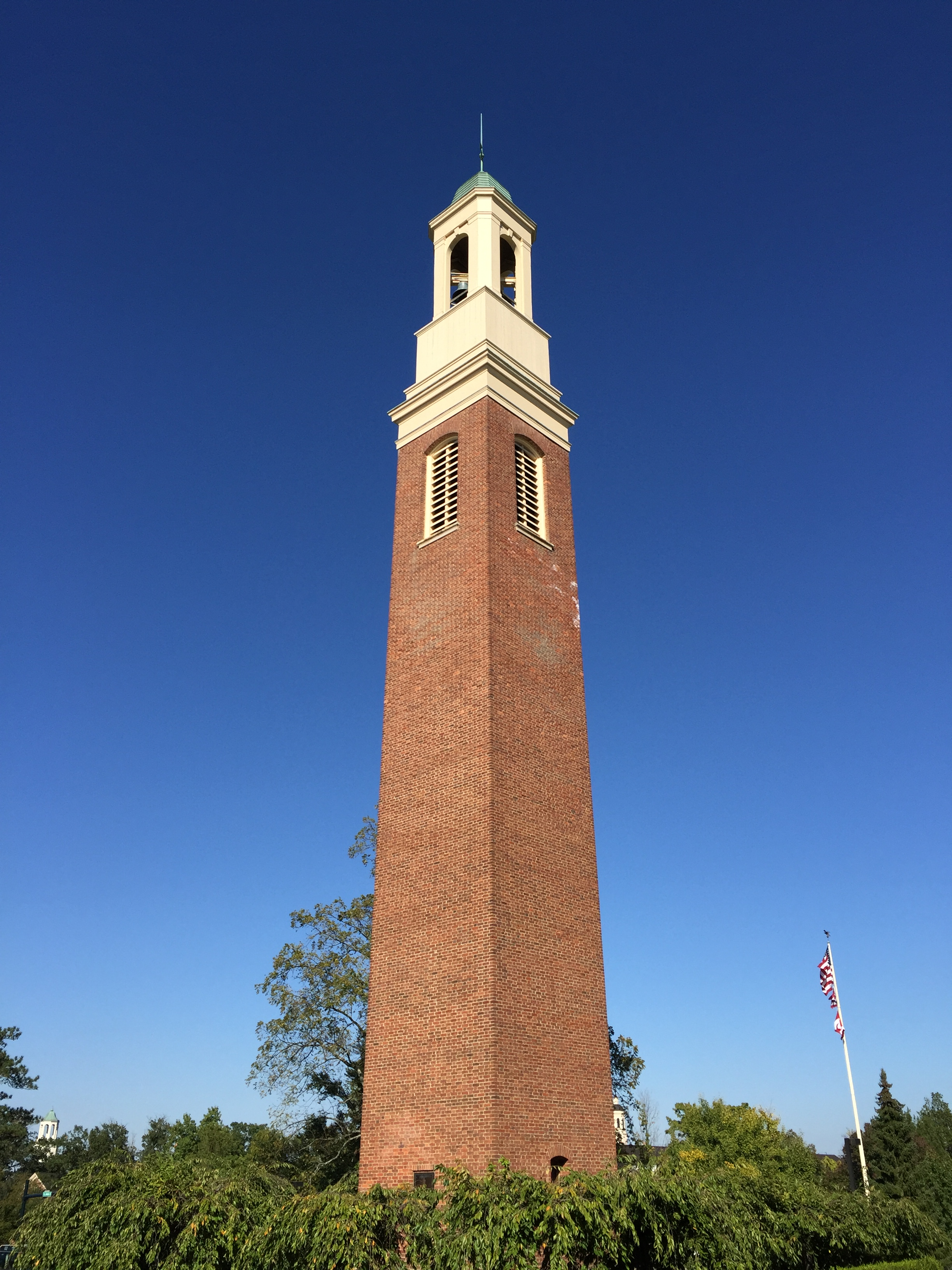
The "Beta Bells" of Miami University were built with funds donated by the Beta Theta Pi fraternity on its Centennial in 1939.

In 1874, the Ohio General Assembly created the new Ohio State University in Columbus as a land grant school upon passage of the Morrill Act of 1862. At that time some representatives proposed that both Ohio University and the closed Miami University be demoted to preparatory schools. In 1880, it was instead suggested that Ohio and Miami be merged directly with Ohio State, but the 1896 Sleeper Bill, introduced by Athenian David L. Sleeper, the speaker of the Ohio House of Representatives, provided annual support for the older universities; this set the precedent for continuing state support. A second challenge was defeated in 1906.

The university reopened in 1885, having paid all of its debts and repaired many of its buildings; there were 40 students in its first year. Enrollment remained under 100 students throughout the late 1800s. Miami focused on aspects outside of the classics, including botany, physics, and geology departments. With its reopening a change in religious policy occurred, the school no longer required faculty to be ordained Presbyterian ministers. In 1888, Miami began inter-collegiate football play in a game against the University of Cincinnati. By the early 1900s, the state of Ohio pledged regular financial support for Miami University and enrollment reached 207 students in 1902. The Ohio General Assembly passed the Sesse Bill in 1902, which mandated coeducation for all Ohio public schools. Miami lacked the rooms to fit all of the students expected the next year, and Miami made an arrangement with the Oxford College for Women to rent rooms. In the same year, David McDill became Miami's first non-Presbyterian president, stressing its non-denominational, but Christian nature during his inauguration. By 1905 faculty personnel belonging to Presbyterian churches constituted 13 out of 27 positions, still a relative but no longer an absolute majority.

In 1902, the Ohio legislature also authorized the establishment of the Ohio State Normal School "to provide proper theoretical and practical training for all students desiring to prepare themselves for the work of teaching." The normal school was Miami's first professional college and would evolve into the College of Education, Health, and Society. Miami's first African-American student, Nelly Craig, graduated from the Ohio State Normal School in 1905. Hepburn Hall, built in 1905, was the first women's dorm at the college. By 1907, the enrollment at the university passed 700 students and women made up about a third of the student body. Andrew Carnegie pledged $40,000 to help build a new library for the university. The McGuffey Laboratory School opened in 1910 and was soon housed with the teacher preparation students in the new McGuffey Hall, completed in 1917 and named to honor former professor William Holmes McGuffey.

Enrollment in 1923 was at 1,500 students and had reached 2,200 students by the early 1930s. In 1928, Miami founded the School of Business Administration and acquired the Oxford College for Women. The next year, the School of Fine Arts was established. The conservative environment found on campus called for little change during the problems of the Great Depression and only about 10 percent of students in the 1930s were on government subsidies. During World War II, Miami changed its curriculum to include "war emergency courses", a Navy Training School took up residence on campus, and the population of the university consisted of a majority of women. Due to the G.I. Bill, enrollment at Miami had grown to 5,000 by 1952.

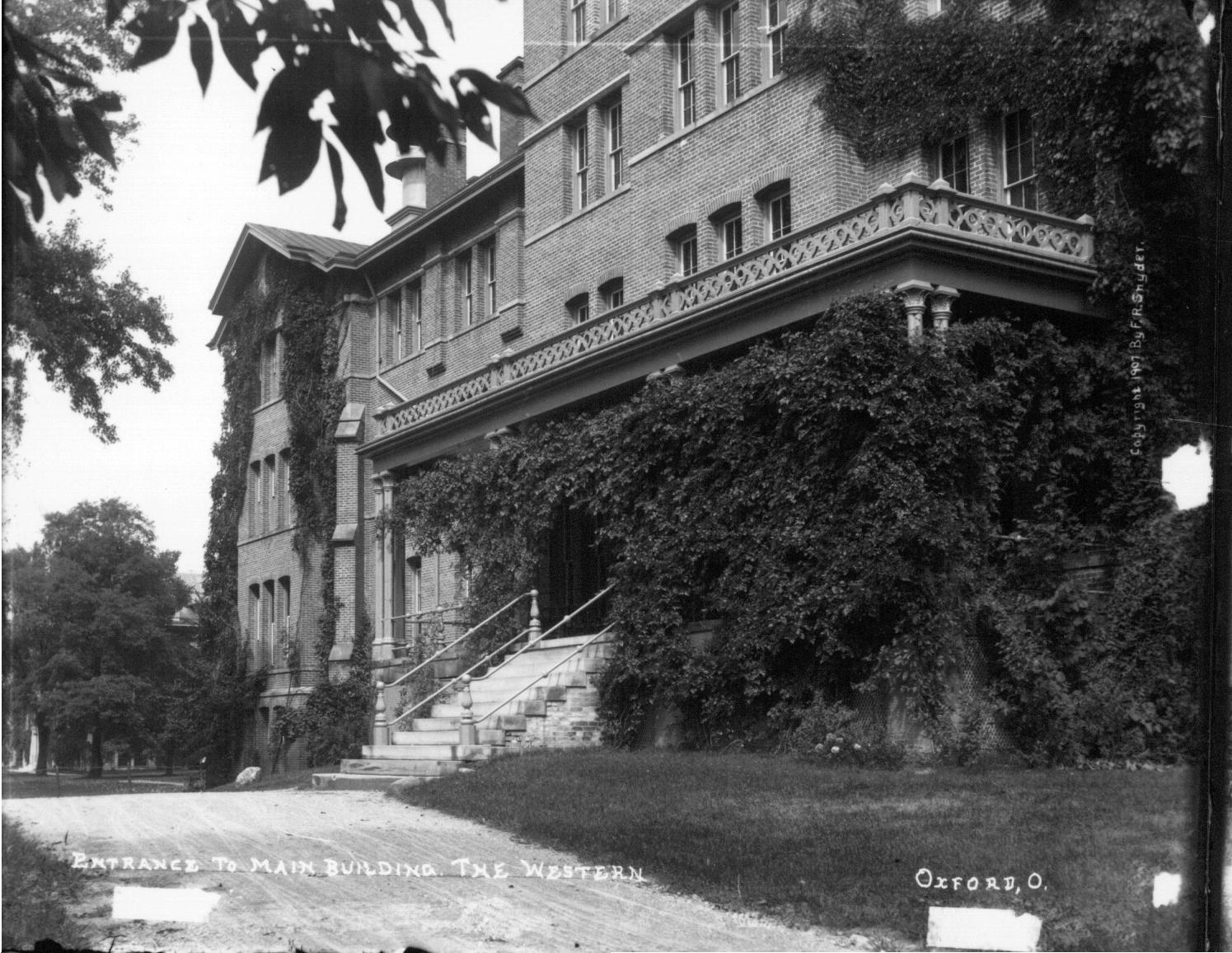
Peabody Hall at the Western College, which was absorbed by Miami in 1974.

In 1954, Miami created a common curriculum for all students to complete to have a base for their other subjects. By 1964, enrollment reached nearly 15,000. To accommodate the growing number of students, Miami University opened its first regional campuses at Miami University Middletown in 1966 and Miami University Hamilton in 1968. The Dolibois European Center was also established in 1968 in Luxembourg City, which would move to Differdange Castle in 1997; it is home to a study abroad program where students live with Luxembourgish host families and study under Miami professors.

On April 15, 1970, a student sit-in at Rowan Hall, home of Miami's Naval ROTC program, in opposition to the Vietnam War resulted in 176 students being arrested. Edgar W. King Library was completed in 1972. In 1974, the Western College for Women in Oxford was sold to Miami, and President Phillip Shriver oversaw the creation of an interdisciplinary studies college known as the Western College Program. Responding to the Miami Tribe of Oklahoma, trustees changed the athletic teams nickname from the "Redskins" to the "RedHawks" in 1997. The School of Engineering and Applied Science was created in 1999.

In 2009, the U.S. House of Representatives passed a resolution honoring Miami University for its 200th anniversary. In the same year, the Farmer School of Business building was completed on the East Quad and the Miami University Voice of America Learning Center opened in West Chester, Ohio. In 2014, the Armstrong Student Center was completed to replace the Shriver Center, which was repurposed. All campuses were closed in March 2020 due to the COVID-19 pandemic, reopening partially that fall. Miami established the Honors College, its first residential college, the following year. The Clinical Health Sciences and Wellness Facility opened in 2023 to combine clinical and academic health departments and services. The McVey Data Science building opened in 2024, funded by alumnus Richard McVey to house departments in computer science, statistics and analytics. In June 2026, the university's board of trustees approved the creation of Miami University Polytechnic at the Hamilton campus; the school will focus on polytechnic education.

== Campuses ==
=== Main campus ===
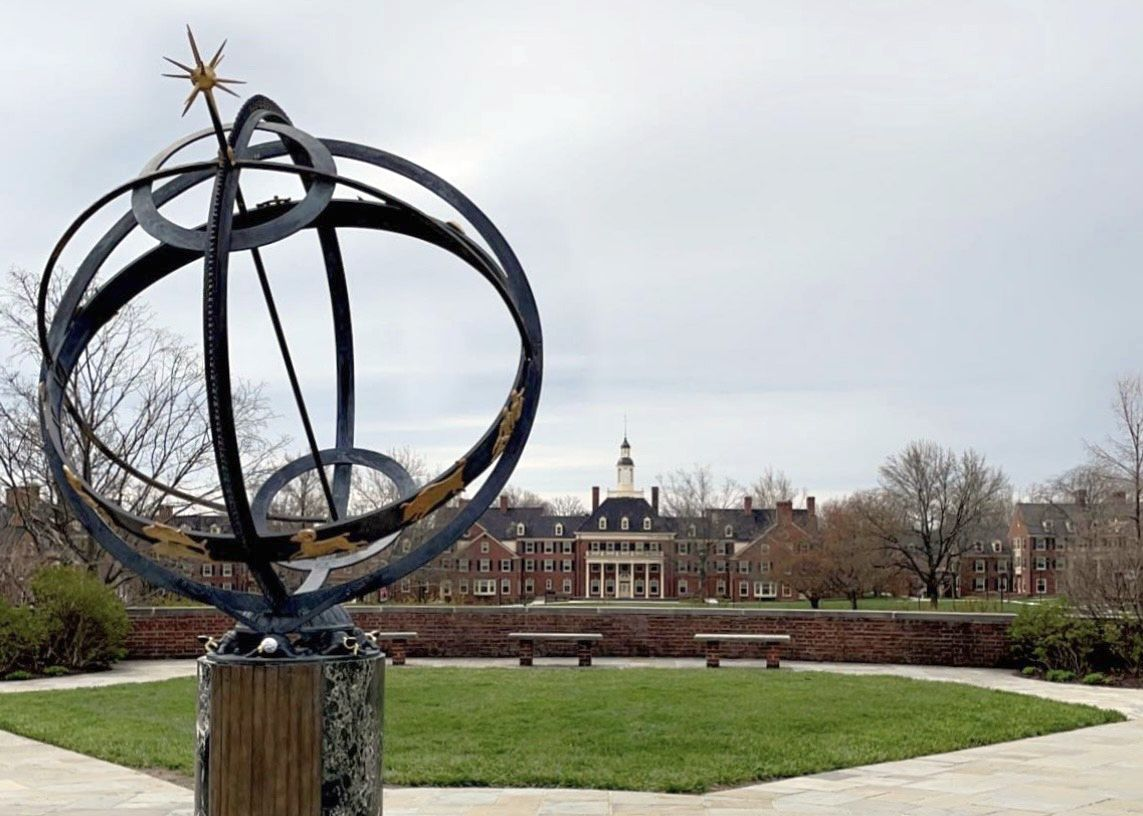
The Tri-Delta Sundial (1962) and MacCracken Hall in the background (1961)

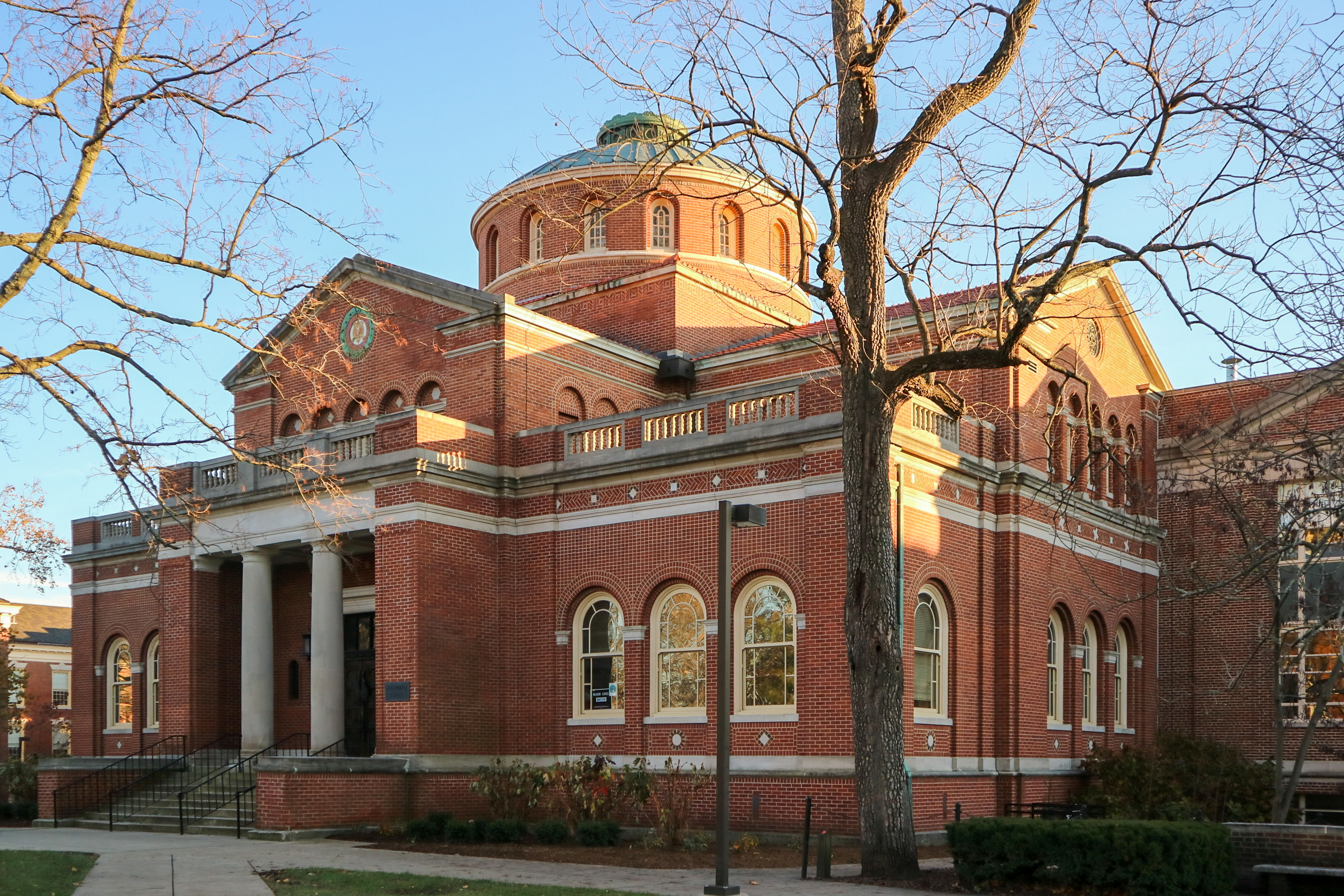
Alumni Hall (1910) was funded by the Carnegie Corporation of New York.

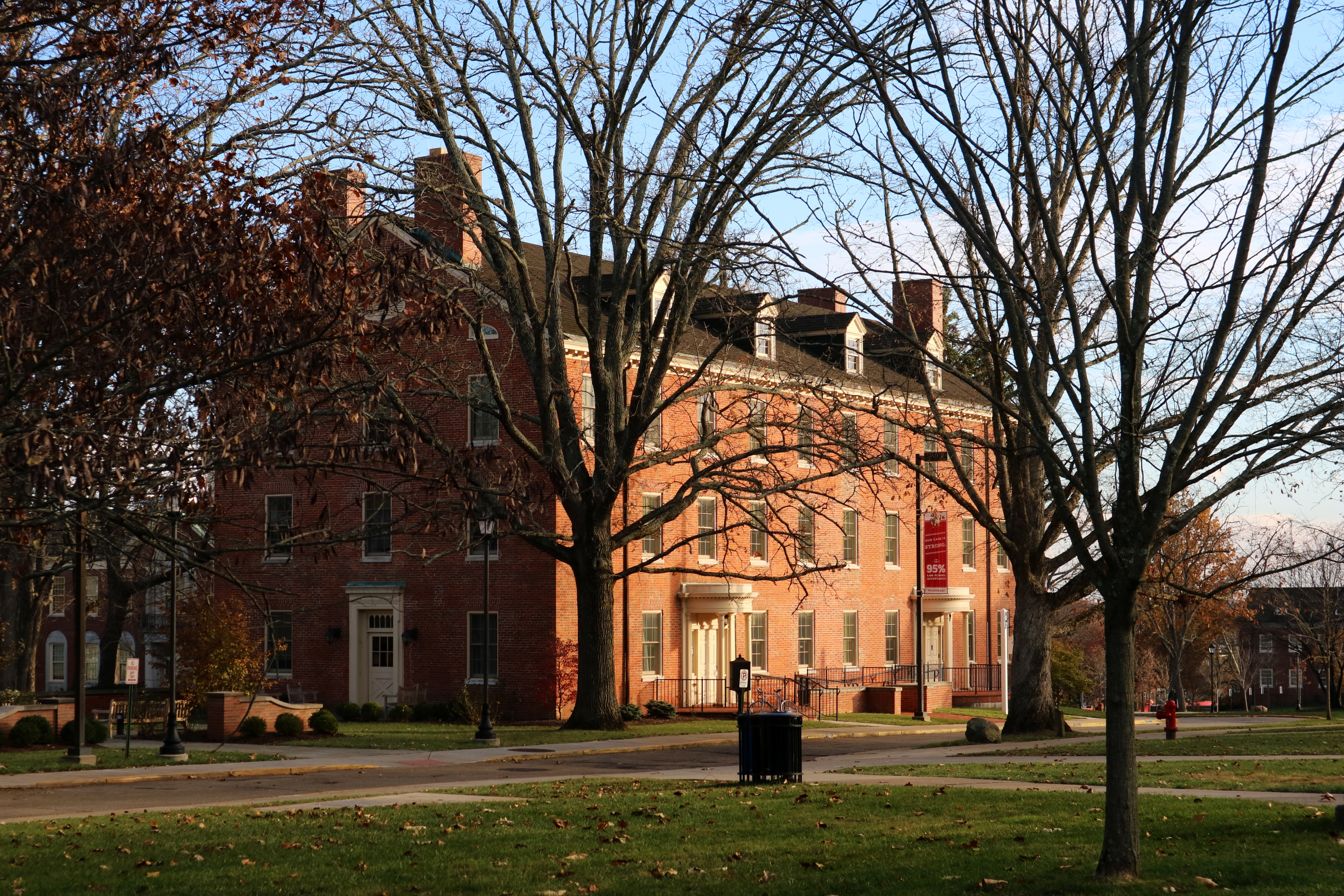
Stoddard Hall (1836) is the second-oldest extant building on campus.

Miami University's main campus is in Oxford, Ohio, a college town in the Miami Valley about 30 miles (48 km) northwest of Cincinnati and 35 miles (56 km) southwest of Dayton. Over 70% of Oxford's residents are enrolled in college or graduate school. Campus development began in 1818 with Franklin Hall, followed by Elliott Hall in 1825, which remains the university's oldest standing building and residence hall. The campus is noted for its Georgian Revival architecture and picturesque layout, described by poet Robert Frost as "the most beautiful campus that ever there was". The Oxford campus spans 2,138 acres (865 ha) and includes four museums: the Richard and Carole Cocks Art Museum, Karl Limper Geology Museum, Hefner Museum of Natural History, and William Holmes McGuffey Museum.

The historic core of the campus centers around the intersection of South Campus Avenue and East High Street, marked by the Phi Delta Theta gates and "Slant Walk" path. This area is known as the "Academic Quad" and includes prominent academic buildings such as Hall Auditorium, McGuffey Hall, Alumni Hall, Bishop Hall and Ogden Hall, all built between 1909 and 1924. Harrison Hall and King Library are also on the Academic Quad. Eastward along East Spring Street lie Irvin Hall, Kreger Hall, and the Armstrong Student Center. Surrounding Bishop Woods at the center of campus are several academic buildings, including Hughes Laboratories, Laws Hall, Shideler Hall, and Upham Hall.

North of East High Street is the McVey Data Science Building and College of Engineering and Computing, comprising Benton Hall and Garland Hall. Clustered around North Patterson Avenue are Pearson Hall, the Psychology Building, and the Farmer School of Business. The latter, housed in a 210,000-square-foot (20,000 m^{2}) building designed by Robert A.M. Stern Architects and Moody Nolan, was the first LEED-certified building on campus. South of East Spring Street are additional academic buildings spread across four streets, including the Clinical Health Sciences and Wellness Facility, the Shriver Center, the Center for Performing Arts, and Bachelor Hall. Western Campus, accessed via South Patterson Avenue, includes Boyd Hall, Hoyt Hall, Peabody Hall, and Presser Hall.

Miami's campus includes several historic landmarks. The Dewitt Log Homestead was built in 1805. Owned by the university, it is the oldest surviving structure in Oxford Township. On the main campus, Elliott and Stoddard Halls, built in 1825 and 1836, are the oldest buildings. Langstroth Cottage was built in 1856 and is a National Historic Landmark. It was the home of L. L. Langstroth, who studied and bred honey bees. The William H. McGuffey House is another National Historic Landmark. Built in 1833, it was the home of author and professor William Holmes McGuffey and believed to be the site where he wrote the first four McGuffey Readers. The Western Female Seminary Historic District denotes the Romanesque and Colonial Revival architecture of the former Western College campus. This campus also hosted orientation sessions for Freedom Summer volunteers in June 1964, a significant campaign of the civil rights movement. The former Oxford Female Institute in uptown Oxford served as a university dorm until 2001 and has since been leased as the Oxford Community Arts Center.

=== Luxembourg campus ===
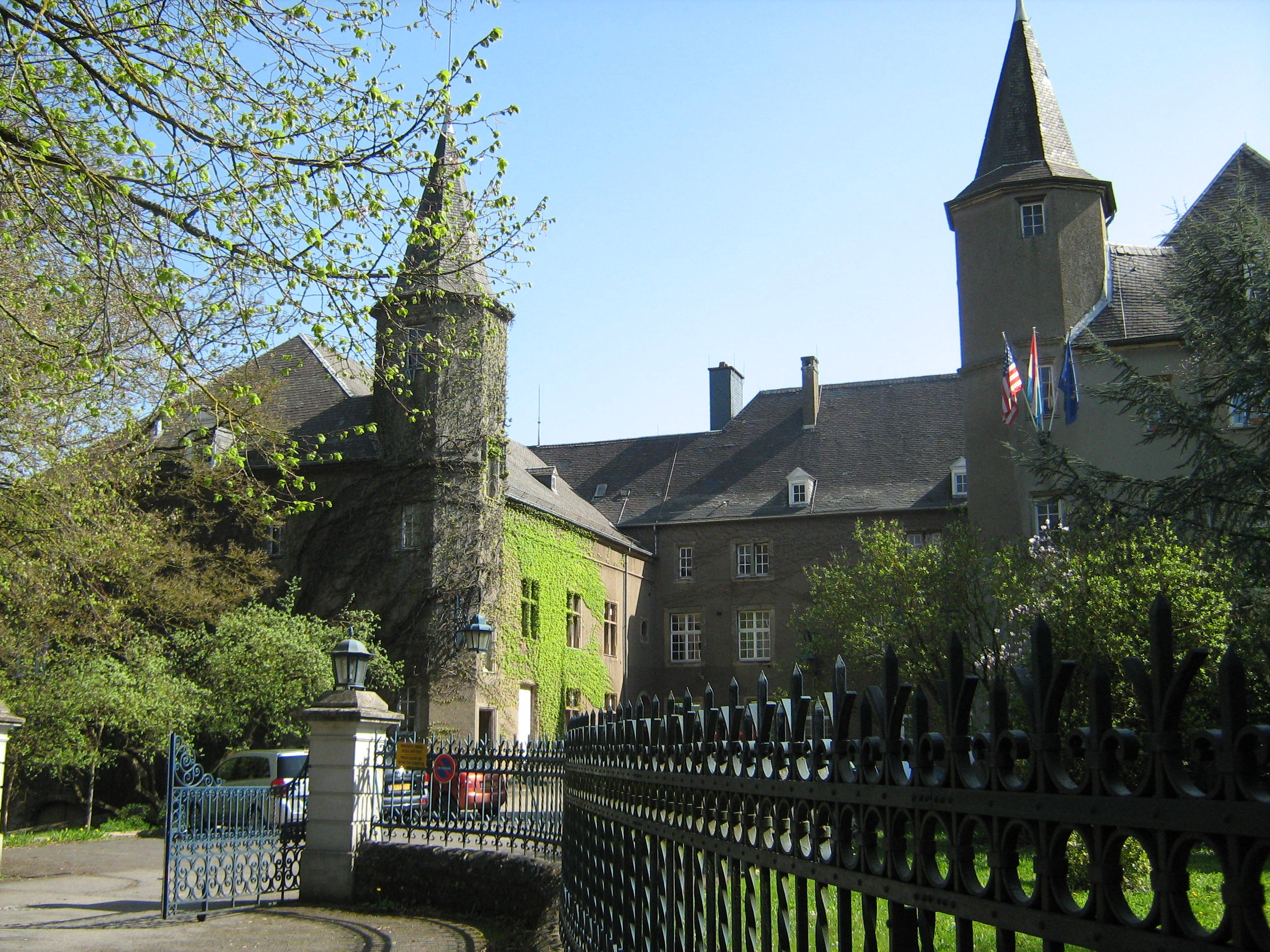
Differdange Castle in Luxembourg is home to the Dolibois European Center.

The John E. Dolibois European Center is an overseas campus of the university in Luxembourg. It enrolls around 125 students each semester from Miami and other American universities. Located in the city of Differdange, it offers courses with university faculty typically in architecture, business, French, German, history, and political science. Students live in homestays with Luxembourgish host families and are encouraged to travel in Europe through university-led study programs and in their free time. It was established in 1968 and named after Miami alumnus John E. Dolibois, former United States Ambassador to Luxembourg.

=== Regional campuses ===
Miami University has three satellite campuses that are located within 25 miles (40 km) of the Oxford campus. Miami University Middletown was founded in 1966 as the first satellite campus in Ohio. Miami University Hamilton was established in 1968, and the Miami University Voice of America Learning Center in West Chester was established in 2009 to house the Farmer School of Business Master of Business Administration program.

Miami's regional campuses are non-residential and offer a handful of bachelor's degrees, associate degrees, certificates, as well as beginning coursework for most four-year degrees, the Master of Business Administration and Master of Education programs at the main campus. Combined, Miami's regional campuses enroll approximately 3,500 students. Middletown and Hamilton compete in independent sports as members of the Ohio Regional Campus Conference, competing under the monikers "Middletown ThunderHawks" and "Hamilton Harriers".

== Organization and administration ==
Miami University has seven primary academic divisions, which include five undergraduate colleges in addition to a residential honors college:

- College of Arts and Science
- Farmer School of Business
- College of Creative Arts
- College of Education, Health, and Society
- College of Engineering and Computing
- Graduate School
- College of Liberal Arts and Applied Science (Miami Regionals)

Miami is part of the public University System of Ohio. It is governed by a board of trustees which oversees the administration of the university and holds subcommittees on investment, finance and audit, and academic and student affairs. This includes oversight on programs offered by the university and financial expenditures. The board has 17 members; nine are voting members appointed by the governor of Ohio, six are university alumni who reside outside of Ohio, and two are enrolled students.

The institution is a member of the Strategic Ohio Council for Higher Education (SOCHE).

The office of the president oversees fiscal and business operations, working with the Board of Trustees to set the university's direction and priorities while also serving as a figurehead and liaison. Gregory P. Crawford, the 22nd president, has held the role since 2016, following his tenure as vice president and associate provost at the University of Notre Dame. Other administrative departments include that of the provost and academic affairs, which includes the deans of each of the academic colleges and the Dolibois European Center, as well as finance, student life, university advancement, information technology, and enrollment.

As of the end of fiscal year 2023, Miami University's financial endowment was $739 million.

== Academics ==
Miami University is a large, primarily residential teaching university with a focus on undergraduate studies. The university offers more than 100 majors, 48 minors, and 11 co-majors. In the 2022–2023 academic year, the most popular majors were finance, marketing, psychology, computer science, and biology.

Miami offers master's degrees in more than 50 areas of study and doctoral degrees in 12, the largest of which are doctoral degrees in psychology. To enroll in graduate courses, students must first be accepted into the Graduate School and then into the department through which the degree is offered. Although tuition for the Graduate School is roughly the same as for an undergraduate degree, most of the graduate programs offer graduate assistantships as well as tuition waivers.

=== Curriculum ===
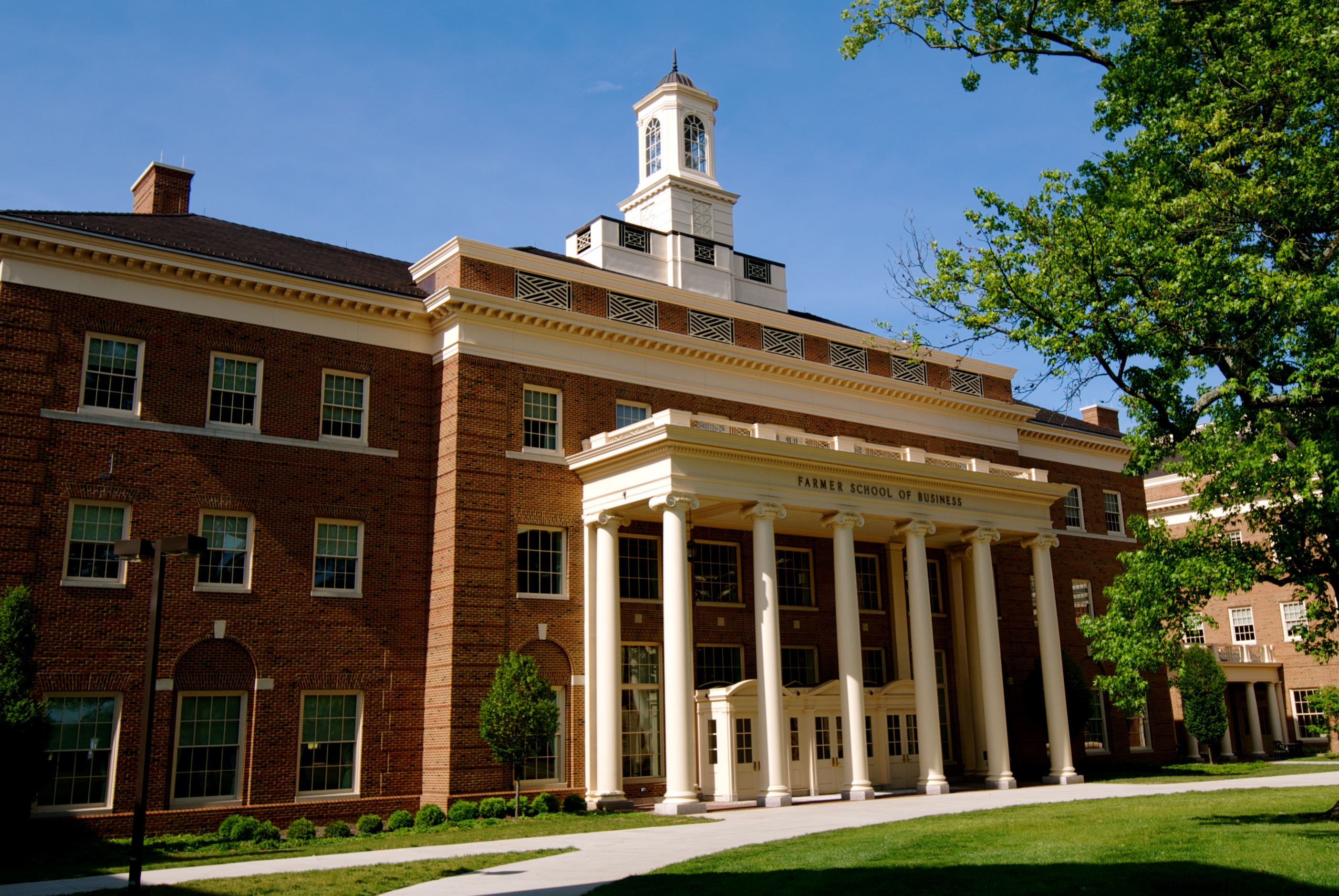
Farmer School of Business campus

The College of Arts and Science is the oldest and largest college at Miami, with almost half of the undergraduate student body enrollment. It offers 70 majors covering a broad range of areas of study across the humanities, natural sciences, and social sciences, as well as pre-law, pre-medical and interdisciplinarity programs. The curriculum emphasizes creativity, research, and global perspectives. 10 of the 12 doctoral degrees offered by Miami are provided through the College of Arts and Science.

Miami's Farmer School of Business is a nationally recognized school of business that offers nine majors. The school also offers graduate MBA, accountancy, and economics degrees. It is named after Miami University alumni and benefactors Richard T. Farmer, founder of Cintas, and his wife Joyce Barnes Farmer.

Miami's College of Creative Arts offers 14 majors through its five departments: architecture and interior design, art, emerging technology in business and design, music, and theatre. Each department has its own portfolio or audition admission requirements, which are separate from the standard admissions requirements for the university. Art and music majors choose concentrations within their programs.

The College of Education, Health and Society offers 20 undergraduate majors spanning six departments, which include educational leadership, educational psychology, family science and social work, kinesiology and health, sports leadership and management, and teacher education. As of fall 2009, nearly 3,500 full-time and part-time undergraduates were enrolled in the school.

The College of Engineering and Computing offers 13 accredited majors at the Oxford campus, and moved into a new $22 million engineering building in 2007. The college has four departments, including chemical, paper, and biomedical engineering; computer science and software engineering; electrical and computer engineering; and mechanical and manufacturing engineering. The school also offers nine master's degrees, 4 of which as M.Eng programs while the rest are M.S. programs, as well as two Ph.D. programs in engineering and computer science.

The Miami University Honors College was established in 2021, replacing the former university honors program on campus. Around 400 students are admitted to the Honors College every year. Based in Peabody Hall on the Western Campus, the Honors College is Miami's only residential college and fosters one-on-one interaction with faculty-in-residence.

=== Libraries and publications ===
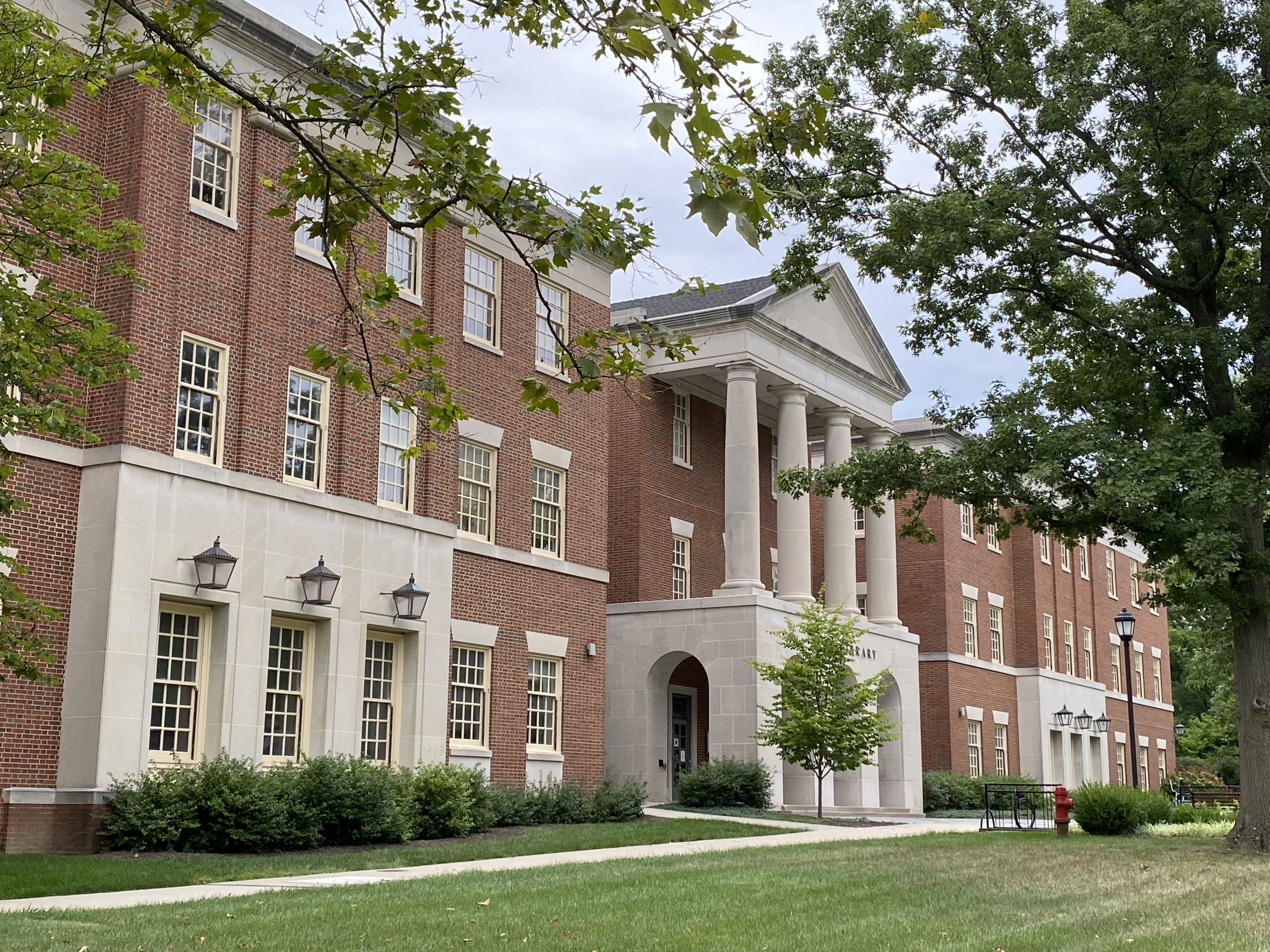
King Library

Edgar W. King Library is the primary academic library at Miami. It opened as an undergraduate library when the south section was completed in 1966; it became the main library when the north section was completed in 1972. King Library is home to Miami University Libraries' humanities, government, law, and social sciences collections as well as the Walter Havighurst special collections and university archives. It additionally houses King Café, centers for academic writing, information management and digital scholarship, and a library makerspace.

In addition to King Library, the university's library system also includes the Wertz Art and Architecture Library in Alumni Hall, the Rentschler Library at Miami University Hamilton and the Gardner-Harvey Library at Miami University Middletown. Prior to the construction of King Library, Alumni Hall was the main university library.

The Miami University Press was established in 1992 and specializes in works of poetry, fiction, and those that detail the history of Miami University.

=== Admissions and costs ===
Undergraduate admissions statistics
- 2026 entering class
- Admit rate: 71.85%

Test scores middle 50%^{[i]}
- SAT Total: 1220–1380
- ACT Composite: 25–31

High school GPA
- Average: 3.63–4.24

Miami University extends offers of admission to applicants after holistic review that includes examination of academic rigor and performance, admissions test scores, personal essays, and recommendations. Admission to Miami University is classified as "more selective" by the Carnegie Classification of Institutions of Higher Education and U.S. News & World Report. The Princeton Review gives Miami University an "Admissions Selectivity Rating" of 88 out of 99.

For first-year undergraduates enrolled in fall 2026, Miami University received 41,022 applications and accepted 29,476 (71.85%). Of the 49.7% of admitted students who submitted ACT or SAT test scores, the middle 50% ranges (25th percentile–75th percentile) were 25–31 and 1220–1380, respectively.

Miami University's freshman retention rate is 89.2%, with 83% going on to graduate within six years. Miami University is a college-sponsor of the National Merit Scholarship Program and sponsored 21 Merit Scholarship awards in 2020. In the 2020–2021 academic year, 28 freshman students were National Merit Scholars.

As of 2024, Miami's annual tuition was $18,162 for Ohio residents and $40,822 for out-of-state residents. Its in-state tuition rate is the highest of all public universities within the University System of Ohio.

=== Reputation and rankings ===
Academic rankings

National
- Forbes: 239
- U.S. News & World Report: 133 (tie)
- Washington Monthly: 283
- WSJ/College Pulse: 227

Global
- QS: 1201–1400
- U.S. News & World Report: 1354 (tie)

National Program Rankings
Program	Ranking
Biological Sciences	158
Chemistry	150
Clinical Psychology	115
Earth Sciences	83
Economics	102
Education	73
Engineering (no doctorate)	23
English	90
Fine Arts	158
Psychology	124
Social Work	172
Speech-Language Pathology	74

In its 2026 rankings, U.S. News & World Report ranked the university's undergraduate program 133rd (tied) among 428 national universities, and 65th among public national universities. U.S. News also ranks Miami University tenth for undergraduate teaching.

Kiplinger's Personal Finance magazine listed Miami as one of the "100 Best Values in Public Colleges" for 2015, ranking Miami 55th nationally. Miami University has appeared on the list since it was first published in 1998. Forbes ranked Miami 155th in the United States among all colleges and universities and listed it as one of "America's Best College Buys".

Miami was named as one of the original eight "Public Ivies" by Yale University admissions officer Richard Moll in 1985. It was listed again in a 2001 publication by college guide authors Howard Greene and Matthew Greene.

In March 2014, Bloomberg Businessweek ranked the undergraduate business program for the Farmer School of Business at 23rd among all U.S. undergraduate business schools and was ranked 8th among public schools. Entrepreneur ranked Miami's Institute for Entrepreneurship in its top ten undergraduate programs in the nation. The Wall Street Journal ranked Miami 22nd among state schools for bringing students directly from undergraduate studies into top graduate programs. The Journal also ranked Miami's accelerated MBA program ninth globally. Miami's accountancy program received high marks from the Public Accounting Report's rankings of accountancy programs; its undergraduate and graduate programs ranked 17th and 20th respectively.

Miami also receives high marks for its campus. Newsweek rated Miami at 19th in its 2012 list of Most Beautiful Schools and poet Robert Frost described it as "The most beautiful campus that ever there was."

== Student life ==
Student body composition as of May 2, 2022
Race and ethnicity	Total
White	75%
Foreign national	9%
Hispanic	5%
Other (Note: Other consists of Multiracial Americans & those who prefer to not say.)	4%
Black	4%
Asian	3%
Economic diversity
Low-income (Note: The percentage of students who received an income-based federal Pell grant intended for low-income students.)	13%
Affluent (Note: The percentage of students who are a part of the American middle class at the bare minimum.)	87%

Miami University has a total enrollment of 18,618 students at the Oxford campus as of fall 2023. Of that, 16,478 students were at the undergraduate level and 2,140 at the graduate level. With a gender distribution of 49% male students and 51% female students, Miami University's gender disparity between men and women is far below the national average, making it one of the most equally balanced undergraduate institutions in the United States.

Within offers for admission in fall 2021, 44% of students were from Ohio, with offers for students from all 50 U.S. states, the District of Columbia and 122 countries abroad. Miami University encompasses 1,614 international students from 67 countries. Of the regularly enrolled international students, the most represented countries are typically China, Vietnam, India, Nepal, and South Korea.

=== Residential life ===
Miami University requires first and second-year students to live on campus. Elliott and Stoddard Halls, built in 1828 and 1835 respectively, are used as dormitories. They are listed on the National Register of Historic Places. The campus has a total of 46 residence halls, the newest of which opened in 2018. The residence halls are organized into eight quads throughout campus. Residence halls have representatives that participate collectively in the Residence Hall Association and the student senate.

=== Student organizations ===
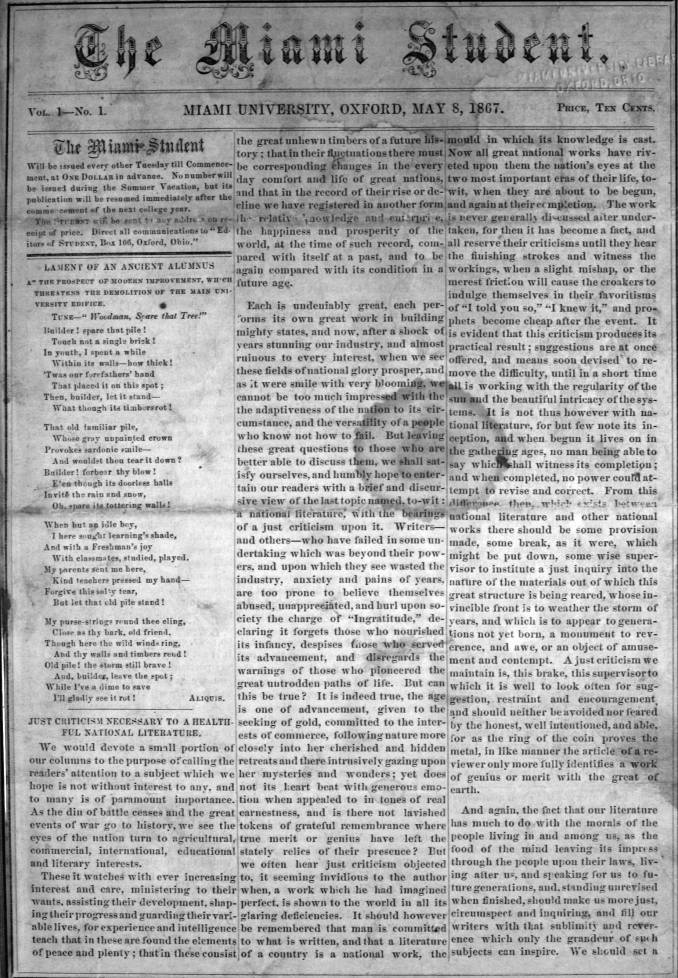
The first issue of The Miami Student, 1867

The university recognizes the Associated Student Government (ASG) that represents student interests to faculty, administrators, and the Ohio Legislature. It is the official student government of Miami University. It has an executive branch chaired by the student body president with 10 members who work with administrators in all areas of student life as well as academics and a legislative branch made up of 50 senators who voice student concerns, write and vote on legislation on a weekly basis.

Miami University participates in the American Mock Trial Association and has won two National Championship Tournament titles: in 2001, defeating Rhodes College, and in 2018, defeating Yale University. The school was the runner-up to the University of Chicago in 2025 and has made 17 top-ten finishes. Miami had the longest-running NCT streak in the American Mock Trial Association, from 2005 to 2023. Miami has also sen competitors to Trial by Combat, a one-on-one competition for outstanding AMTA competitors.

Miami has a variety of media outlets. The student-run newspaper, The Miami Student, claims to have been founded in 1826, which would make it the oldest university newspaper in the United States. However, the first issue is dated May 1867, and the paper refers to itself as "the oldest college newspaper west of the Alleghenies." The Miami Student Magazine is a sister publication to the newspaper. The bi-annual publication includes feature writing and short stories. The undergraduate literature and art magazine, Inklings, is available in print and online. RedHawk Radio (WMSR) is Miami's only student radio station. Miami University Television (MUTV) is available on cable in Oxford, Ohio. UP Magazine is Miami's student-run fashion magazine that publishes an issue each semester and also maintains a blog.

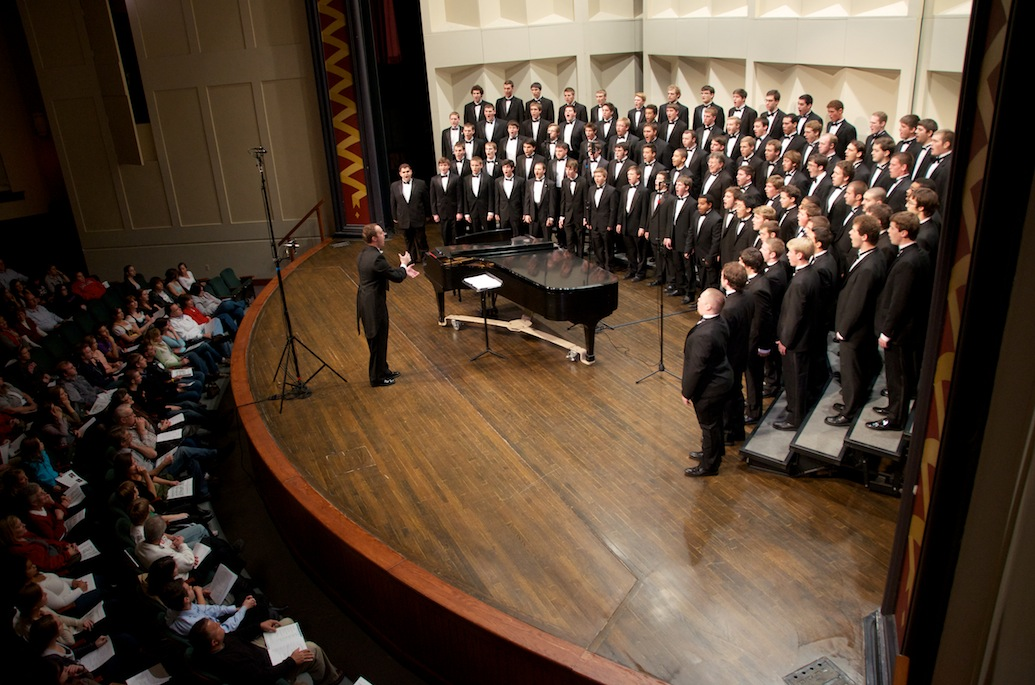
Miami University Men's Glee Club

Aside from the university's student newspaper, the university's oldest and longest-running academic student organization is the Miami University Men's Glee Club. Founded in 1907 by professor Raymond H. Burke, composer of Miami's fight song and alma mater, the glee club is among the oldest and largest groups of its kind in the nation. The Glee Club has performed with major symphony orchestras, among them the Cincinnati Symphony Orchestra, and worked with composers, conductors and singers such as Morten Lauridsen, Martina Arroyo, Max Rudolf, Thomas Schippers, Paul Salamunovich, A. R. Rahman, and Friar Alessandro. The Glee Club performs a biannual international tour, which has included stops at the Normandy American Cemetery and Memorial. The Glee Club also hosts one men's a cappella singing group, The Cheezies.

The Miami University Marching Band is the largest student organization on campus, typically fielding around 250 to 275 students. It represents the college at all home football games, as well as at various away games, bowl games, parades, and marching band festivals.

=== Greek life ===
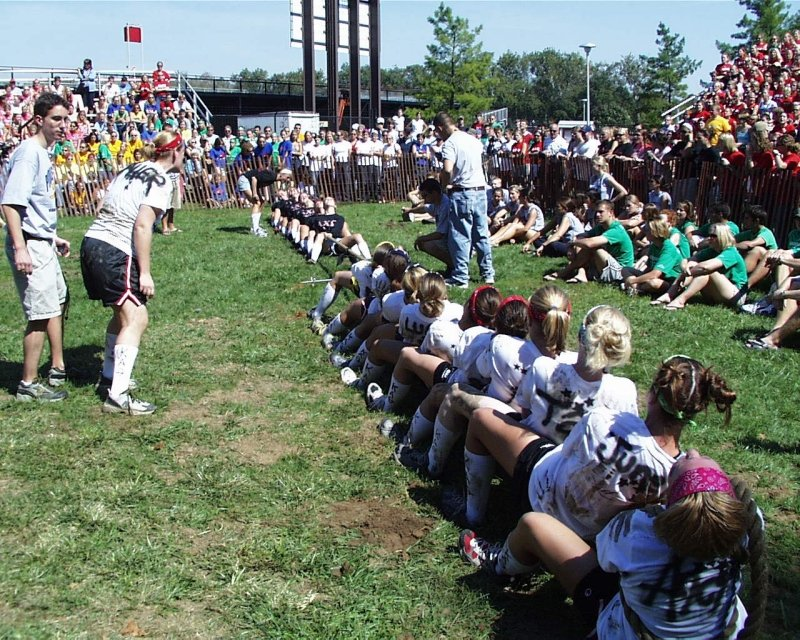
Greek Week "Puddle Pull" tug of war contest

Miami has a long tradition of Greek life, beginning in 1832 with the founding of the Miami chapter of Alpha Delta Phi. Miami is nicknamed the Mother of Fraternities for the number of fraternities that started on its campus, including three known as the Miami Triad: Beta Theta Pi (1839), Phi Delta Theta (1848), and Sigma Chi (1855). Other Greek organizations founded at Miami include Phi Kappa Tau (1906) and Delta Zeta (1902).

As of the fall of 2017, there were 2,556 sorority members and 1,544 fraternity members. Miami hosts about 50 different fraternities and sororities governed by three different student governing councils. In 2004, Miami University's office of Greek affairs was endowed with a $1 million gift from alumnus Cliff Alexander, a member of Sigma Nu.

In the 2017 fall semester, the Greek community recorded 11,847 service hours and raised $96,839 for philanthropic causes. The university has suspended various chapters of Greek organizations for disorderly conduct, hazing, and alcohol violations.

=== Traditions ===
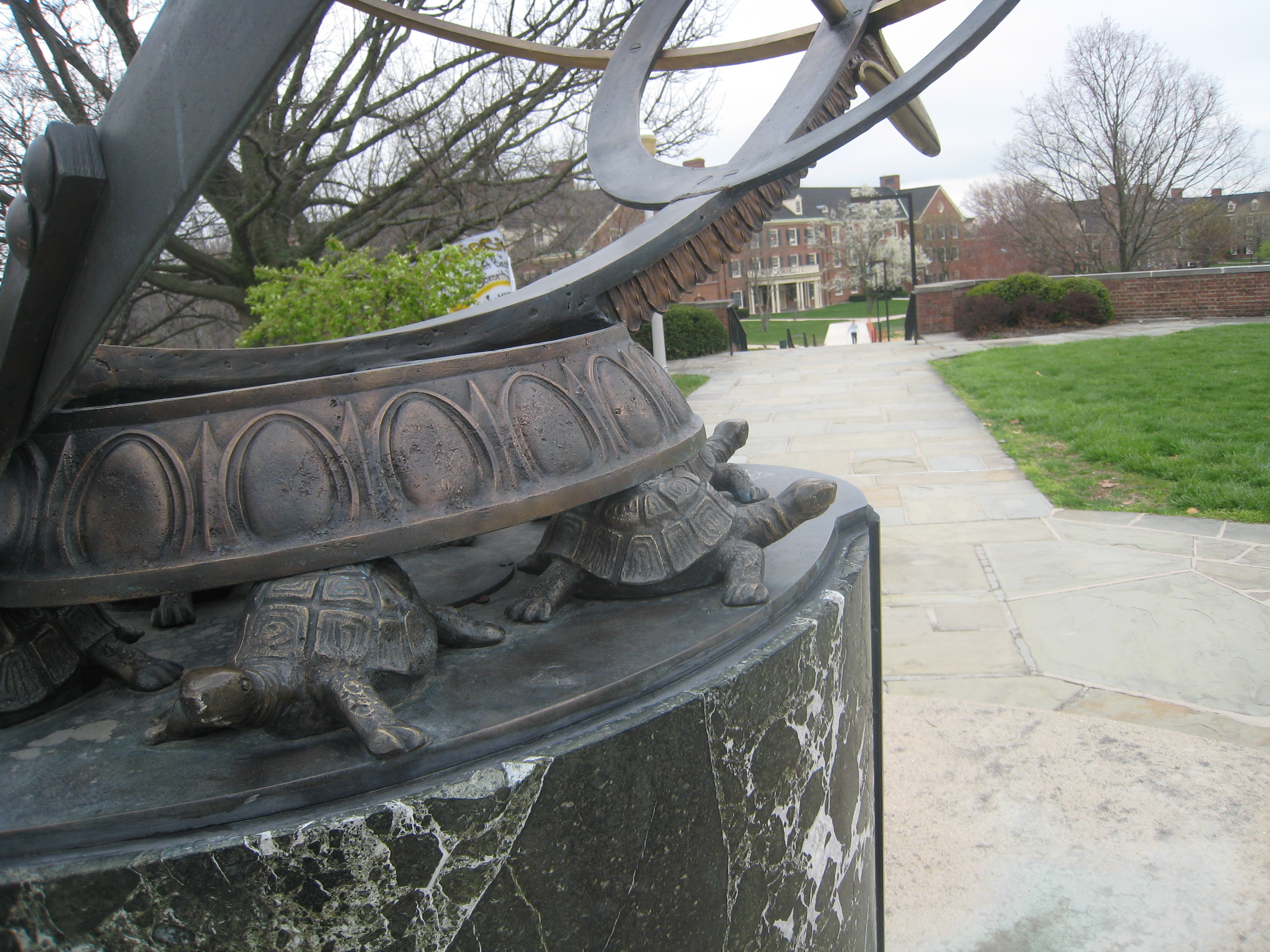
Turtles at the base of the Tri-Delta sundial

The university's student body has two notable superstitions. Stepping on the large copper replica of the university's seal by Upham Hall is believed to bring bad results for a student's exams; inversely, it is considered good luck to rub the heads of the copper turtles supporting the Delta Delta Delta sundial before exams.

When two students meet at Miami, enter into a relationship, and then get married, they are called "Miami Mergers". Couples are encouraged to register with the university's alumni association, which has sent Miami Mergers an annual Valentine's Day card since 1973. In 2022, 14,406 Miami Merger couples received a Valentine's Day card from the association. Another campus superstition is that couples who kiss under the arch of Upham Hall at midnight will become Miami Mergers.

Green Beer Day is an unofficial day-long party near the Miami University campus where celebrants drink green-dyed beer on the Thursday before Miami's spring break. It was established in the early 1980s by local bar owners. Green Beer Day has been called one of the university's "biggest traditions", although it is not sanctioned by the university, which has worked to combat binge drinking in preparation for the event.

== Athletics ==
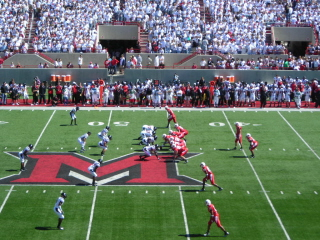
The Miami RedHawks football team facing off against Cincinnati at Yager Stadium

Miami's National Collegiate Athletic Association (NCAA) Division I sports teams are called the RedHawks; the program offers 18 varsity sports for men and women. They compete in the Mid-American Conference (MAC) in all varsity sports except ice hockey, which competes in the National Collegiate Hockey Conference, and men’s swimming and diving, which competes in the Missouri Valley Conference. Miami's athletic teams had several names before 1928, when Miami Publicity Director R.J. McGinnis coined the nickname "Redskins". In 1996, the Miami Tribe of Oklahoma, which works with the university on Native American relations, withdrew its support for the nickname. The board of trustees voted to change the nickname to the RedHawks in 1997. The current athletic director is David Sayler, who was hired to the position in December 2012.

Miami University fosters a complementary relationship with Ohio University, highlighted by the Battle of the Bricks.

Miami is nicknamed the "Cradle of Coaches" for the coaches that have trained through the Miami RedHawks football program, including College Football Hall of Fame inductees Paul Brown, Carmen Cozza, Weeb Ewbank, Ara Parseghian, Earl Blaik, Woody Hayes, Bo Schembechler, and Jim Tressel. Two former players, John Harbaugh and Sean McVay, coached their respective teams to victories in Super Bowl XLVII and Super Bowl LVI, with McVay becoming the youngest head coach to win the Super Bowl at age 36. Former Miami quarterback Ben Roethlisberger became a two-time Super Bowl winning quarterback for the Pittsburgh Steelers. Miami's football team plays in Yager Stadium; they formerly played in the now demolished Miami Field. The current head coach is Chuck Martin, who was named head coach on December 3, 2013. The RedHawks compete each year against the Cincinnati Bearcats for the Victory Bell, a tradition that dates back to 1888. The RedHawks are 8–7 all-time in bowl games and have secured 23 conference titles as of the 2023 season.

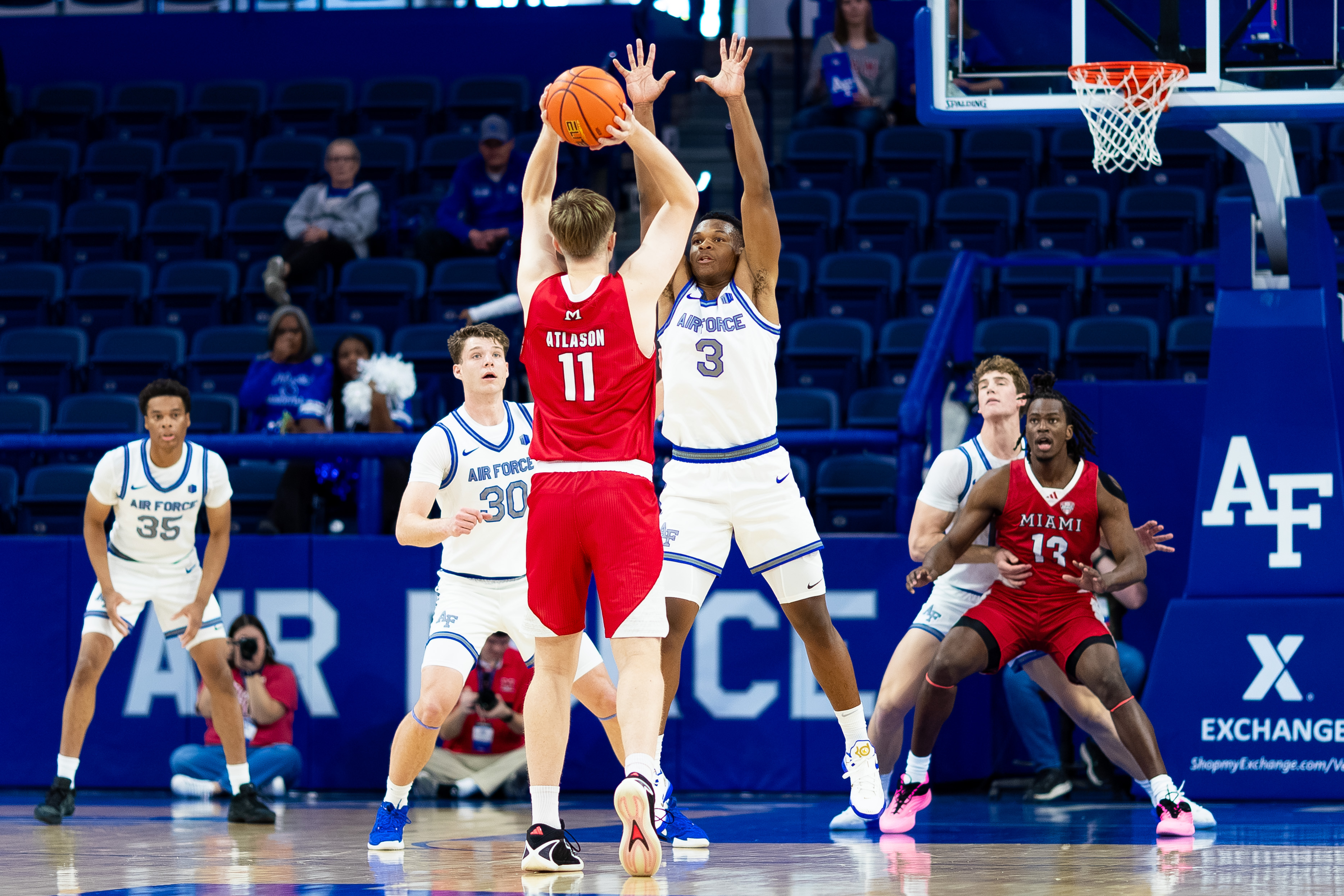
A game between the Miami RedHawks men's basketball team and the Air Force Falcons

The Miami RedHawks men's basketball team has appeared in 18 NCAA basketball championship tournaments, reaching the Sweet Sixteen four times, most recently in 1999. Notable former student-athletes have included Randy Ayers, Ron Harper, Wally Szczerbiak, and Wayne Embry. The team competes in Millett Hall and is coached by Travis Steele. The 2025–26 team went an undefeated 31–0 in the regular season, setting multiple school and MAC records.

Miami RedHawks men's ice hockey team started in 1978 coached by Steve Cady. The RedHawks made the NCAA national title game in 2009, but lost in overtime to the Boston University Terriers after leading much of the game. They have made 12 appearances in the NCAA tournament. The men's ice hockey team plays at the Goggin Ice Center as part of the National Collegiate Hockey Conference.

The Miami University Synchronized Skating Team team began in August 1977 as a "Precision Skating Club" at Goggin Ice Center. The program achieved varsity status by 1996. The Miami University senior synchronized skating team are the 1999, 2006, and 2009 U.S. national champions. Miami won a silver medal at the 2007 World Championships, the first medal ever won by Team USA for synchronized skating. The collegiate-level team has won 18 national titles; Miami created a junior-varsity level team beneath the senior level.

At one time Miami had a competitive wrestling program, but eliminated the wrestling program, along with men's golf and tennis, in 1999 to better comply with Title IX regulations. Several members of the cut teams sued the university president, athletic director, and board of trustees, alleging that the removal of the teams violated their Fourteenth Amendment and Title IX protections. Enlisting the help of the Center for Individual Rights, the students took their case to the United States District Court for the Southern District of Ohio, where a district judge denied their claims. The students appealed to the United States Court of Appeals for the Sixth Circuit, where two judges affirmed the district court's ruling.

== Alumni ==
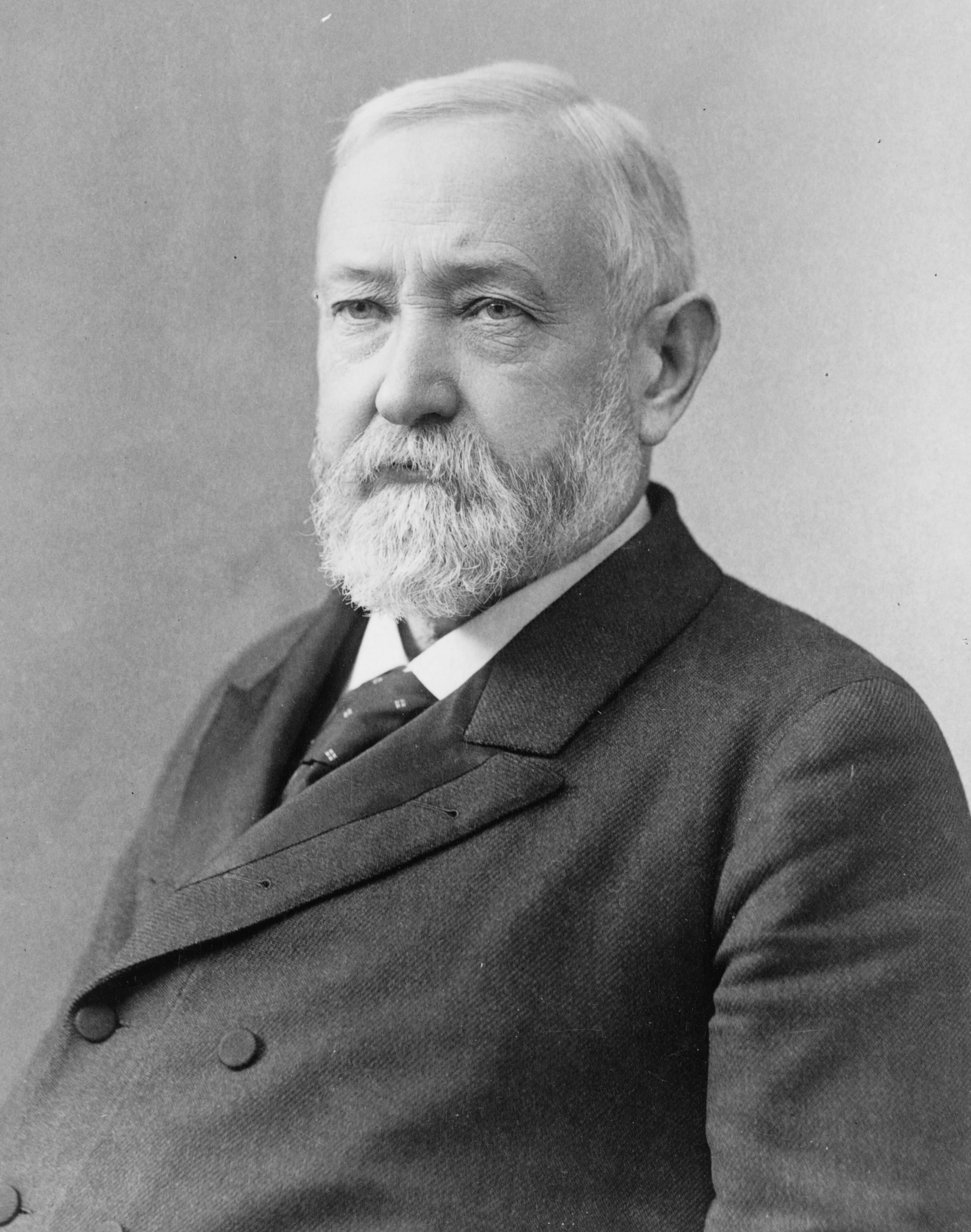
Miami alumnus Benjamin Harrison was the 23rd president of the United States.

Miami University has more than 220,000 alumni. Alumni are active through various organizations and events, such as Alumni Weekend. The Alumni Association has active chapters in over 50 cities. A number of Miami alumni have made significant contributions in the fields of academia, business, entertainment, government, journalism, and sports, among others.

Benjamin Harrison, the 23rd president of the United States, graduated from Miami University in 1852. Chung Un-chan, the 36th prime minister of South Korea, received a master's degree in economics from Miami in 1972. Paul Ryan, the 54th speaker of the United States House of Representatives, graduated from Miami in 1992. Other notable political alumni include eight governors, (Note: They are Ohio governors Charles Anderson, James E. Campbell, William Dennison Jr., Mike DeWine, and Andrew L. Harris, as well as John J. McRae of Mississippi, Oliver P. Morton of Indiana, and John B. Weller of California.) six U.S. Senators, (Note: They are Calvin S. Brice, Maria Cantwell, Mike DeWine, John J. McRae, Oliver P. Morton, George E. Pugh, and John B. Weller) along with numerous federal representatives, state legislators, and ambassadors. Miami graduate and admiral Sidney Souers was the first director of the Central Intelligence Agency.

Prominent alumni in business include Brian Niccol, who currently serves as the chairman and CEO of Starbucks; C. Michael Armstrong, who was chairman and CEO of both AT&T and Hughes Aircraft Co., as well as chairman of the President's Export Council; Lynn Good, former president and CEO of Duke Energy; Marne Levine, former chief business officer at Facebook and COO of Instagram; Arthur D. Collins, Jr., former chairman and CEO of Medtronic; John G. Smale, former chief executive of Procter & Gamble and chairman of General Motors; and Cintas founder and CEO emeritus Richard T. Farmer, after whom the university's business school is named.

Rita Dove, a Pulitzer Prize winner and the first African-American United States Poet Laureate, graduated summa cum laude from Miami. Political satirist and journalist P.J. O'Rourke graduated from Miami in 1969, and CNN/Fox News host Bill Hemmer received a degree in journalism in 1987. Famous alumni entertainers include Mojo Nixon, Nick Lachey, and Tina Louise. In science, notable alumni include theoretical physicist Benjamin W. Lee.

In sports, Chris Rose is a studio host with the MLB Network and NFL Network. Current NFL head coaches John Harbaugh and Sean McVay both played football at Miami. Paul Brown, the partial founder of both the Cleveland Browns and the Cincinnati Bengals and a head coach for both teams, graduated from the class of 1930. Numerous Miami alumni have played in professional sports leagues, among them NBA All-Stars Wayne Embry and Wally Szczerbiak, and two-time Super Bowl-winning quarterback Ben Roethlisberger.

== See also ==
- Miami University Press
- Cradle of Coaches
- Green Beer Day
- Harker's Run
- Miami Tribe of Oklahoma
- Mother of Fraternities
