= The Miami Student =

Student newspaper of Miami University in Oxford, Ohio, USA

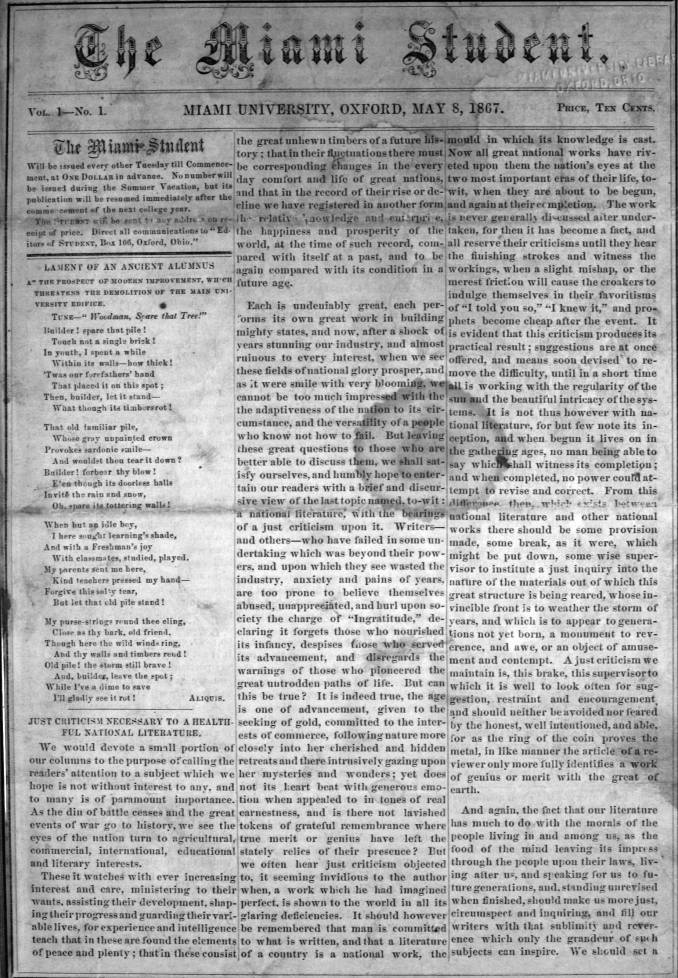
- The first issue of The Miami Student from May 8, 1867.
- Type: Student newspaper
- Format: Broadsheet
- Founded: 1826; 200 years ago (credited); May 8, 1867; 159 years ago (actual)
- Headquarters: 3018 Armstrong Student Center; 550 E. Spring St. Oxford, Ohio 45056; United States
- Circulation: 8,000
- Website: miamistudent.net

The Miami Student is the official student-published newspaper at Miami University in Oxford, Ohio, published in print every other Friday during the academic year. The Student is the “Oldest college newspaper west of the Alleghenies,” after it first began in 1826, under the name of The Literary Focus. In May of 1867, it began publishing as The Miami Student, and has since remained.

The current Editor in Chief is Shannon Mahoney, with Managing Editor Elisa Rosenthal.

== Sections ==
Campus and Community - Keeps up-to-date in current events happening on/around Oxford. This also reports any breaking news, such as drug busts and deaths.

Sports - Reports on game results, athlete profiles and transfers, and game previews.

Culture - Provides a wide variety of coverage on all things art/culture related, from album reviews, movie recommendations, as well as rating restaurants in the area.

Opinion - This section functions as an outlet for any writer to share their thoughts. Guest columnists can also submit their work via email.

Humor - Home to satirical work, often discussing the challenges that come with college life with a sarcastic sense of humor.

Greenhawks - Keeps up to date in all of the ecological updates at and around Miami.

Photo - As well as providing photos for nearly all stories, the Photo section also produces a themed photostory in every printed paper.

== Awards ==
As of 2025, The Student holds the following awards

- 2024 and 2025 Corbin Gwaltney Award for Best All-Around Student Newspaper in the large school category, beating out every student paper at a university over 10,000 students in Ohio, Michigan, West Virginia and Western Pennsylvania.
- 2025 Ohio Society of Professional Journalists (SPJ) Award — First Place in the Best College Newspaper category.
- 2024 Ohio Society of Professional Journalists (SPJ) Award — Second Place in the Best College Newspaper category.
- 2024 Ohio News Media Association Award – First Place in Collegiate Opinion Writing and First Place in Collegiate Sports Coverage in the large school category.
- 2025 Ohio News Media Association Award for First Place in Best Website.
