= King Library (Miami University) =

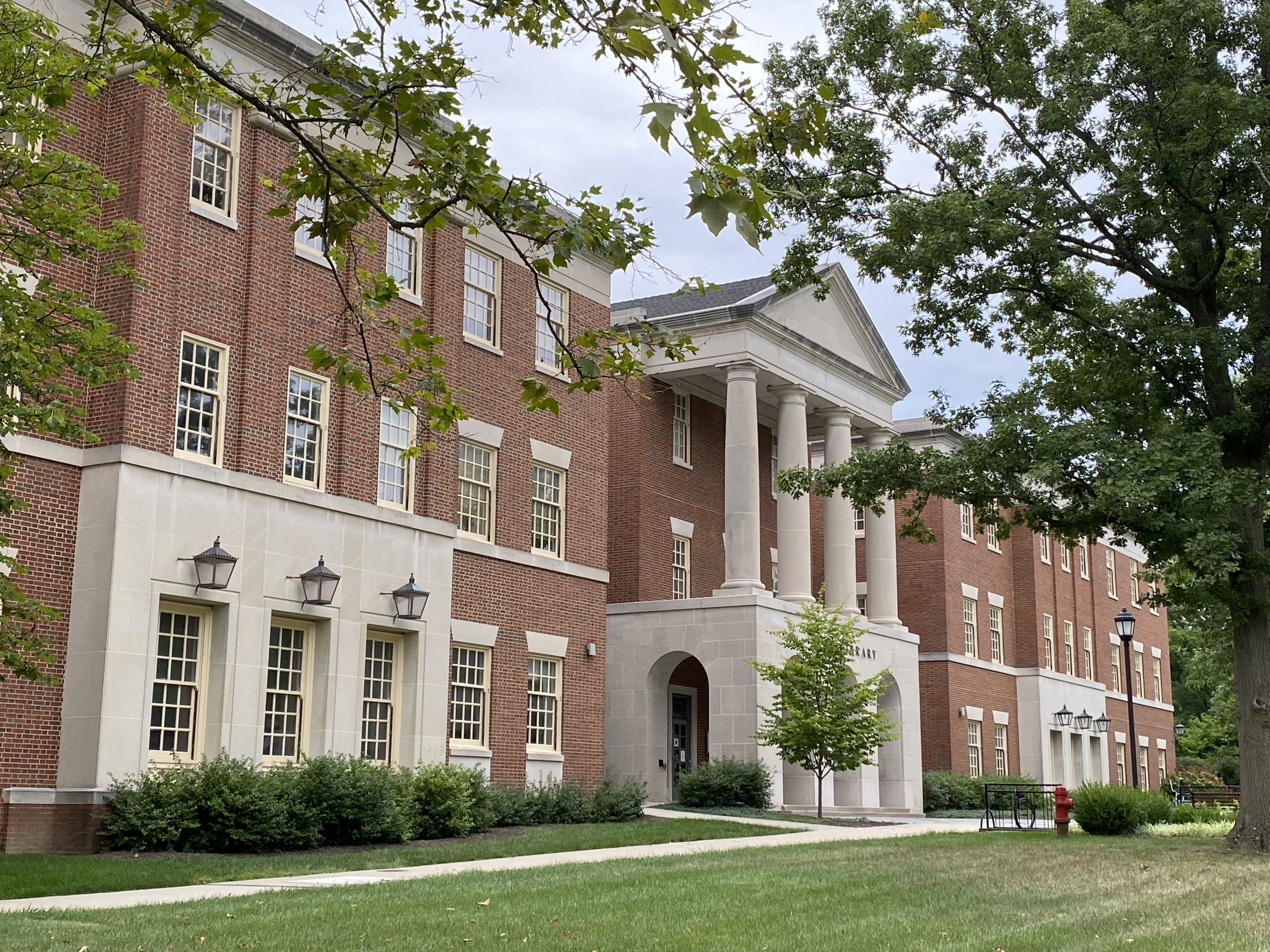
- King library
- Interactive map of the King Library area

General information
- Type: Library
- Architectural style: Georgian architecture
- Location: Oxford, Ohio, 151 South Campus Avenue, United States of America
- Coordinates: 39°30′31.2″N 84°44′16.8″W
- Inaugurated: 17 February 1973
- Cost: USD $3.574 million

Technical details
- Floor area: 175,159 sq ft (16,272.8 m^{2})

Design and construction
- Architects: Frank Messer and Sons; Lorenz + Williams; Lively and Likens

Website
- www.lib.miamioh.edu

King Library is the main library of Miami University in Oxford, Ohio. The largest of four libraries on the Oxford campus, it serves as the primary library facility and center of administration for the Miami University Libraries system. Currently, King Library is home to the Walter Havighurst Special Collections, Miami University Archives, Western College for Women Archives, the Center for Information Management (CIM), Government Information & Law collection, Instructional Materials Center (IMC), Center for Digital Scholarship, Technical Services, Access Services, Libraries Systems, senior administrative offices, and the Libraries' Preservation/Conservation Lab. King also serves as home to the Howe Center for Writing Excellence, as well as the King Cafe Coffee Shop.

King was extensively renovated through a three-phase rehabilitation project, beginning in the late 1990s and ending in 2007.

Originally built to be a central library facility with subject areas divided up by levels. By 1978, the Brill Science Library was added to the west wing of Hughes Hall, and science collections were transferred there to accommodate an ever-expanding collection.

== History ==
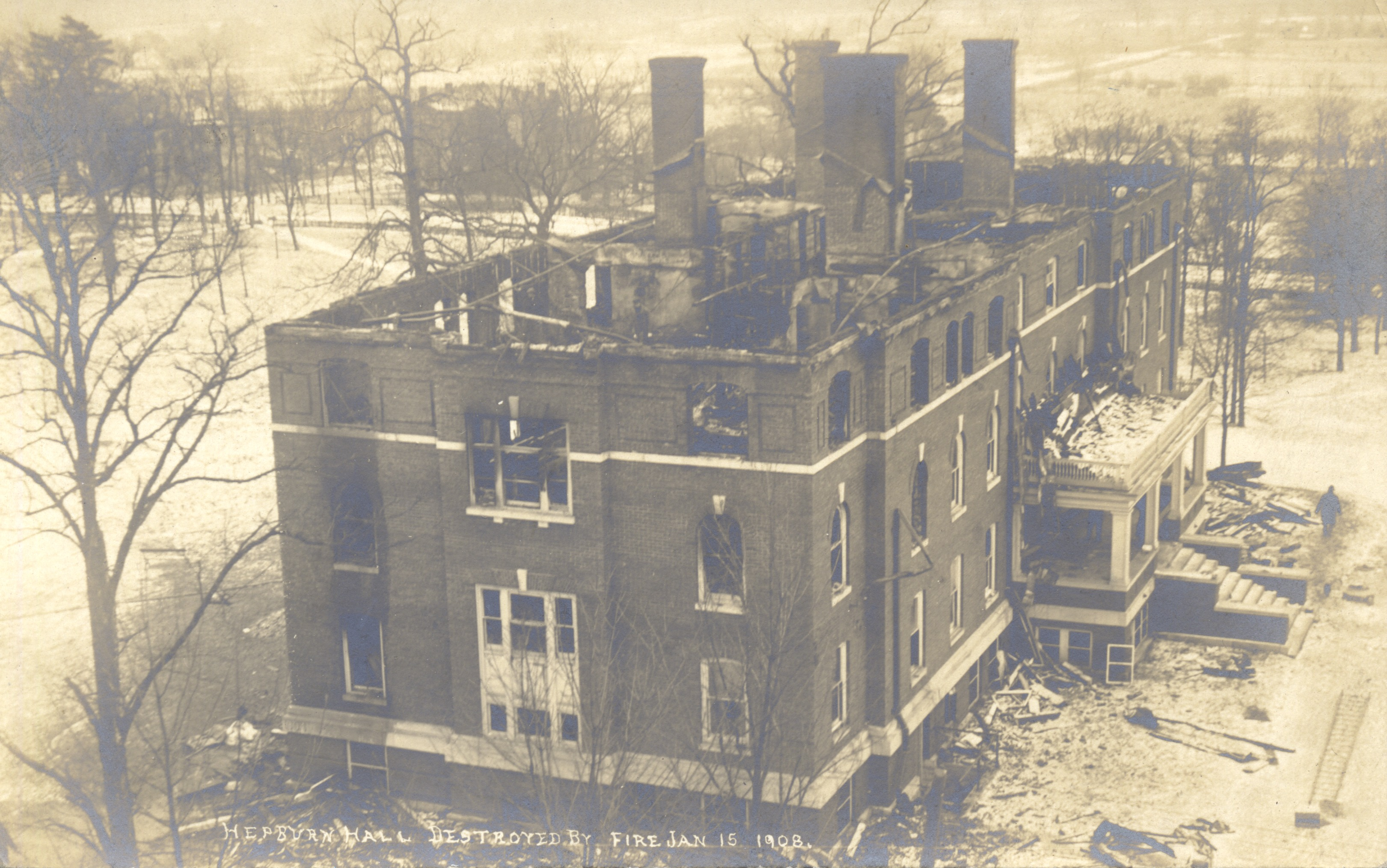
Hepburn hall in 1908 after the fire.

In the early 1900s, the site of King Library was held by Hepburn Hall, a residence building for women. The shortage of housing forced some women to live in the attic about the third floor. Because some of the lights were defective, some residents had to strike matches to find their way and it was rumored that some women used the attic as a smoking lounge. Due to these circumstances, a major fire burned down Hepburn Hall on January 14, 1908.

King Library was originally known as the King Undergraduate Library when the south section was completed in 1966. When the north section was completed in 1972, the word “undergraduate” was dropped from its name. Before King Library was built, Alumni Library was used as the main university library. When King Library was completed in 1972, Alumni Library was changed to Alumni Hall.

When the library opened in 1966, sixty volunteer fraternity men transferred 40,000 volumes, pushing book trucks up and down ramps across the quad from the old Alumni library.

The building was named after Edgar Weld King, who funded the construction. Dedication to Edgar King and the library was held on 17 February 1973 at King Library, where he gave a speech in front of the university.

== Construction ==
In total, King Library cost $3.574 million to build. The building was completed in two phases: the first phase, the south wing, was designed by the architecture firm, Lorenz and Williams, and built by Frank Messer and Sons of Cincinnati; the architects of record for the north wing were Lorenz and Williams and Lively and Likens, with Danis serving as general contractor. The south section was finished in 1966 and the north section was finished in 1972.

The building consists of four floors: the basement, first floor, second floor, and third floor.

== Edgar Weld King ==
King Library was named after Edgar Weld King. He was born in Berlin, Germany on December 24, 1893. After earning an A.B. degree at Oberlin College in 1916, King received a diploma from the Library School of New York University and a Master of Arts degree from Columbia University in 1922. That year, he was appointed librarian at Miami and served continuously until his retirement in 1956. In 1957, the honorary degree of Doctor of Humane Letters was conferred on him by Miami. During his tenure the library grew from 67,000 volumes to over 350,000 volumes.
