= Shriver Center =

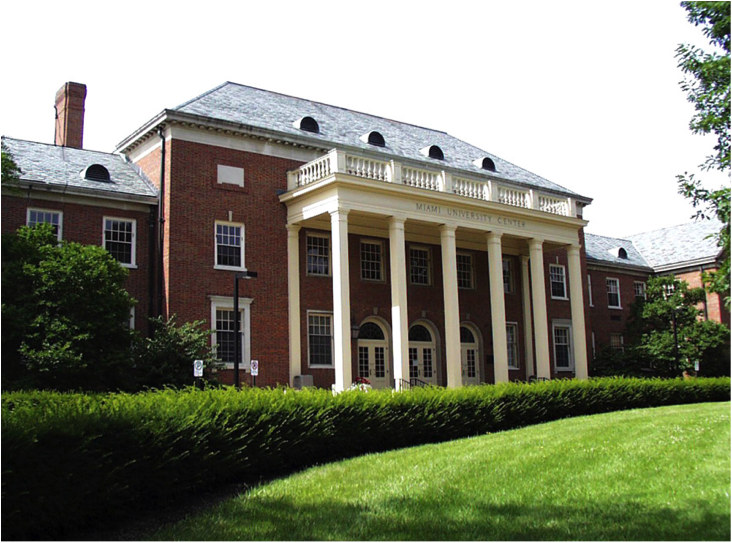
- Frontal view of the center
- Interactive map of the Shriver Center area
- Former names: University Center

General information
- Type: Student union
- Architectural style: Georgian
- Location: Oxford, Ohio, United States
- Coordinates: 39°30′23.7″N 84°43′54.6″W
- Construction started: 1 October 1954
- Completed: 1957 (Renovated 1981)
- Cost: unknown

Technical details
- Floor area: 127,969 sq ft

The Shriver Center, located at Miami University in Oxford, Ohio, USA, was first opened as the University Center in 1958. Later it was renamed as the Phillip R. Shriver Center, and provided space for not just the student body at the university, but also for faculty, staff and the greater Oxford community.

Today the student body is triple the size it was 50 years ago when the University Center first opened. Although the building is still a cornerstone of the Miami University Campus, due to high demand from the community and severe limitations on space, there is little room left for students. Therefore a new student union building, the Armstrong Student Center, was built, located diagonally across from the Shriver Center, in the heart of Miami University's campus.

Miami University's Student Shriver Center was not built and allowed for public use until 1957. It was originally known as the University Center and was made as a center designed specifically for students after World War II. Prior to this being built, the students did not have a center dedicated specifically to them. The closest thing the student body had for recreational purposes – other than a gym – was what was known as the Miami's Redskin Reservation, which was simply a dining hall. After World War II, students petitioned for a center for themselves.

== History ==
The university center announced its plans to be built and its purpose in 1954. When the University Center was opening, it was decided that the school would have an opening ceremony. According to a Miami Student article that came out on 1 October that year the ceremony drew in a near 2,000 people. It shocked nearly everyone who came out to this event, but it simply emphasized how much this new center meant to the entire university. Closing off the ceremony was President John D. Millett who explained why the center was given its name. He declares: “this building is for the use of all members of the Miami family. We acknowledge and welcome the use of the building by them.” The University Center is the basis of Shriver Center, with interior changes and lacking the additional East wing. It was quite a recreational facility, including a bowling alley and a new dining hall with a wide menu variety. It was just what the student's were looking for.

Six years later, in 1963, the East Wing was built and they were able to add in more stores for students, such as a book and clothing store with Miami University swag. A huge change came to the University Center in 1981. President Phillip R. Shriver was retiring from the Miami University presidency and, in his honor the building was going to be dedicated to him by having the building named after him. He was told of this dedication during his going away ceremony and was very shocked, pleased and honored. In 1985 the Shriver Center Committee announces that there will be an addition to the building, which will make it less crowded and will add some more modern architecture to it. The building was not complete until 1991, which was a big hassle on for students and other Miami faculty who expected for it to be completed earlier. However, it was well worth the wait because the building won a few awards for its architectural style using brick. This should be important to Miami's body today because, aside from minor interior updates, it is the same building used.

== Armstrong Center ==
While the Shriver Center is a fantastic university center, in 2008 Miami announced that a new building will be built designed specifically and wholly for the students: The Bicentennial Student Center. It is something that Miami has struggled in making for a while and it is a long time overdue. The building will be located on Spring Street, diagonally facing the Shriver Center. According to its website, “the building concept connects the past and the future, renovating Culler, Gaskill and Rowan Halls and joining them, as functioning parts… with a new structure constructed in the expansive space between the existing buildings.” There will be two main entrances into building and the entryway and walkway will be mostly naturally lit by a skylight.

The building will include a theater, a pavilion to hold events in, a common room in which students can sit down and either socialize or do work, Center for Student Engagement and Leadership where student-led groups can hold meetings and, finally, have a few large lobbies and conference rooms where students can gather for extra study space due to high demand. On June 30, 2010, it was announced that the Bicentennial Center will now be called the Armstrong Student Center. The reason for this name change was because of two alums who graduated in 1961, both with the last name Armstrong, donated $15 million to this project. Funding was lacking for the building and these two alums felt the donation and building was needed for the students.
