= McGuffey Hall =

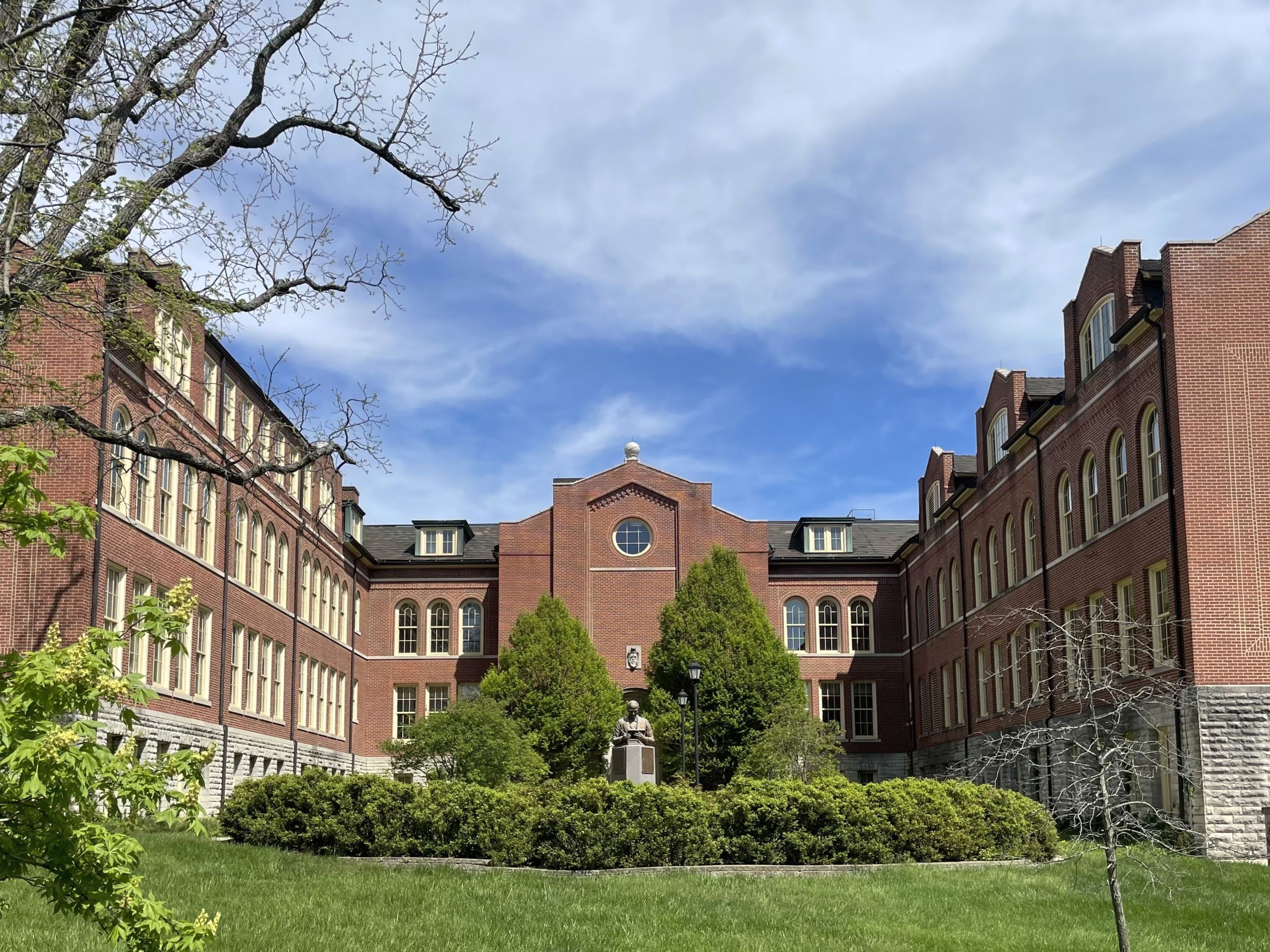
- McGuffey Hall at Miami University in 2022
- Interactive map of the McGuffey Hall area

General information
- Type: Department of EHS
- Architectural style: Georgian
- Location: Oxford, Ohio, United States
- Coordinates: 39°30′28.2″N 84°44′17.73″W
- Construction started: 1909
- Owner: Miami University

Technical details
- Floor area: 107,000 sq ft (9,900 m^{2})

McGuffey Hall is an academic building at Miami University in Oxford, Ohio. McGuffey Hall is home to Miami University's College of Education, Health and Society. The hall was named after William Holmes McGuffey, father of the McGuffey Readers textbook series. McGuffey Hall housed the School of Education (known as the "Ohio State Normal College" in its early days of 1902, the "Teachers' College" from 1916–29, at which time the name was changed to "School of Education". It also housed the McGuffey Elementary Laboratory School, which came into existence in 1910, and which was and still used by the University for observation and practice teaching purposes.

== History ==
The laboratory school, consisting of kindergarten and twelve grades, was originally known as the "Normal College Model School of Miami University." However within a year after it came into being (1911), the name of the school was changed to McGuffey Schools," in honor of the man who organized the first teachers' training class in Ohio. The McGuffey Schools were located in the south section, and the building still was referred to as the South Pavilion of the Normal College Building. Until construction of the Central Pavilion in 1916, the South and North Pavilions were separate buildings. The North and Central Pavilions provided accommodations for work of the Teacher's College. In 1916-17 the entire Normal College Building was renamed "McGuffey Hall."

=== William Holmes McGuffey ===
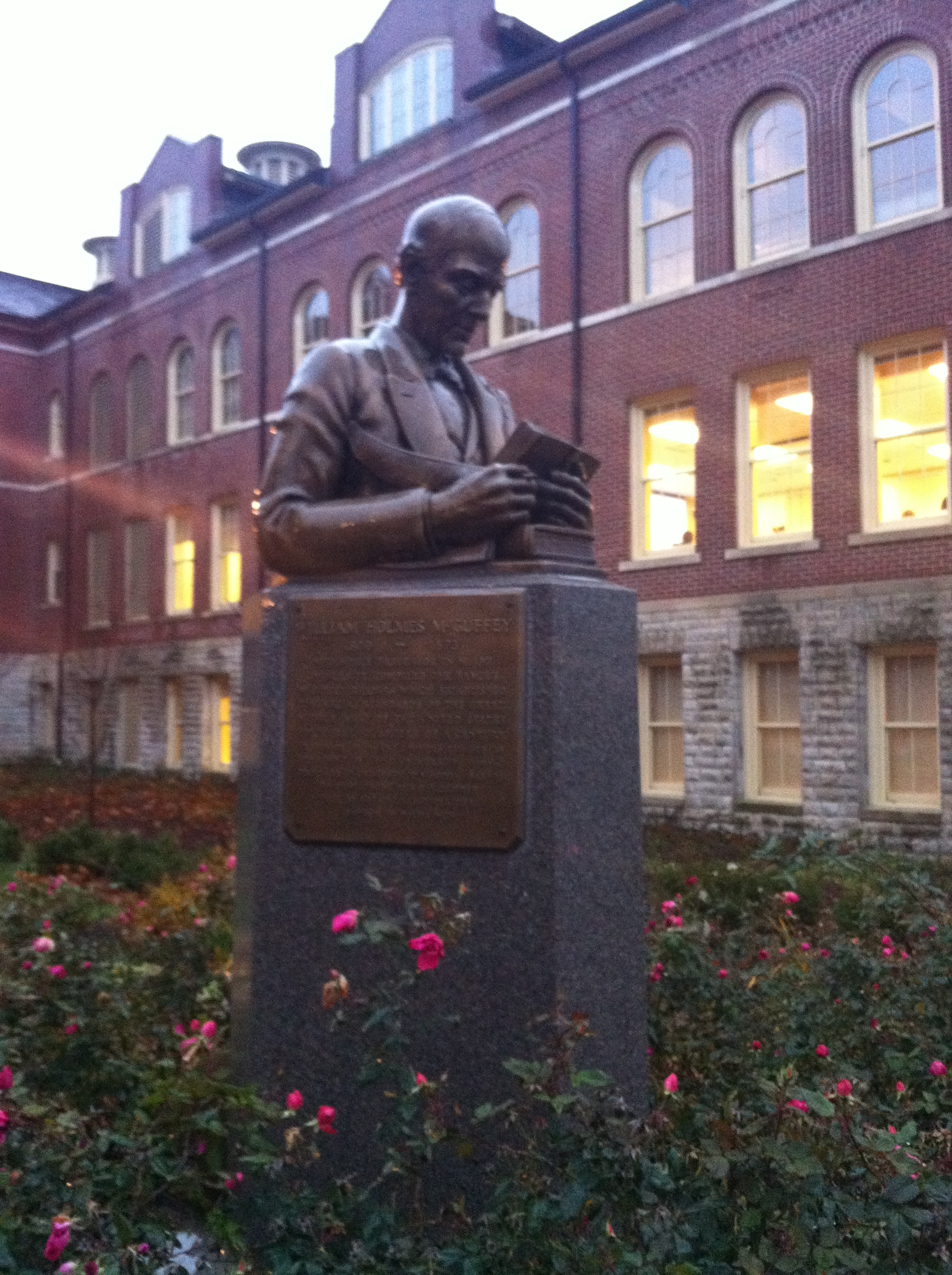
Statue of William Holmes McGuffey outside McGuffey Hall.

William McGuffey was a Miami professor of Latin, Greek, and Hebrew from 1826–32, a professor of mental philosophy, philology, and general criticism at Miami from 1832–36, and author of the famed McGuffey Eclectic Readers, which were widely used in schools throughout the nation during the last half of the 19th century. McGuffey received is A.B. degree from Washington College in Pennsylvania in 1826 and his D.D. degree from Washington College in 1842. (1826 – 1836) - McGuffey was a faculty member of Miami. (1836 – 1839) – He was president of Cincinnati College. (1843 – 1845) – He was president of Ohio University. (1843 – 1845) – He taught at Woodward College

== Construction ==
The present McGuffey Hall structure was built in three different sections. The original building was constructed in 1909. Later additions and sections were erected years later. The use for the building was set to be the School of Education and Elementary Laboratory School. The total cost of the building was $364,000 with those funds coming from the state. The total square footage of the school is approximately 107,000 and the cubic footage approximately 1,290,000. In 1924-25 the south wing was extended eastward and a gymnasium occupied the upper two floors. Included in the building are an auditorium which seats 300, a gymnasium, a cafeteria, a library(Heckert), which contains the Alstetter Collection of Children's Books which is considered to be one of the best collections of children's books in America.

The southwest wing was built in 1909, costing approximately $45,000 at the size of 25,109 square feet. The northwest wing was added on in 1915, costing approximately $89,000 at the size of 29,612 square feet. The central section was built in 1916, costing approximately $54,000 at the size of 13,400 square feet, and the southeast wing was built in 1925 at a cost of $165,000. In 1939, extensive alteration and fireproofing was done to the southwest wing. In 1966 the north half was remodeled and in 1971, the south half was remodeled.

== Structure ==
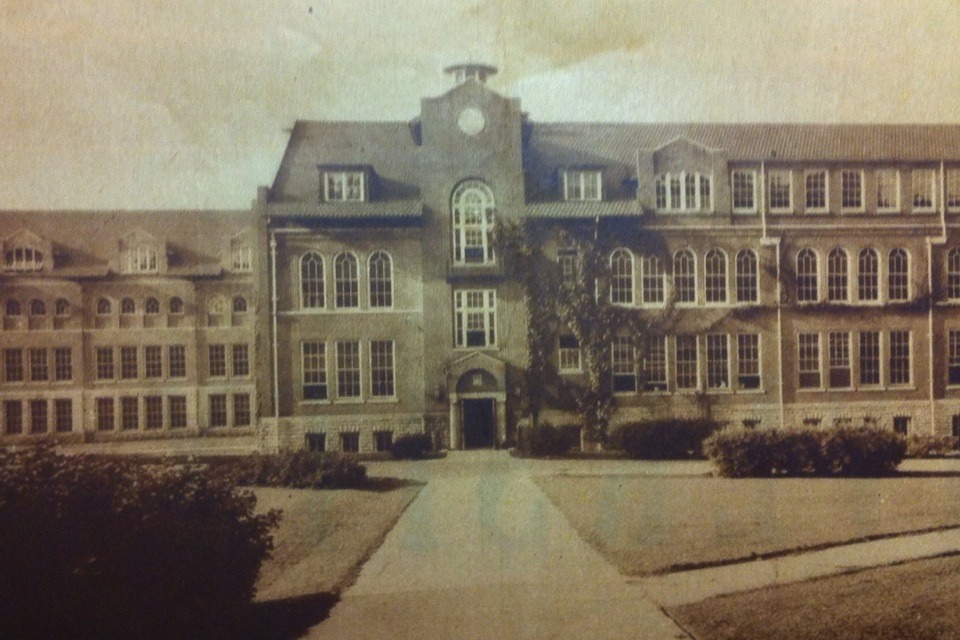
McGuffey Hall as School of Education, 1910 "Miami University Archives"

The building is located on a slightly rolling area of ground in conjunction with and a part of the total university campus. The nature of the terrain is conducive to good drainage. The present site is bounded on the south by Spring Street and on the west by Campus. On the Northeast the a service drive originating on Campus Street and terminating at Spring Street encircles the building forming a natural driving line from the adjacent campus areas.

The building has been constructed in three units. It is a modified U-shaped continuous unit with a gable, tiled roof, three floors, and a ground level floor. A sub-basement contains crawl space, pipes, ventilating and heating equipment. The structure is brick and mortar and fully fire-resistant in the 1914 and 1924 sections.

=== Cafeteria ===
The cafeteria was built in 1922 and involved the excavation of additional room under the south pavilion of the building. The additional room, after joined to the existing basement, had a total floor area of 12,000 square feet, sufficient room to accommodate 150-160 children during the noon hour.

== College of Education, Health, and Society ==
McGuffey Hall serves as the primary home of the College of Education, Health and Society at Miami University. The Dean's Office as well four of the college's six academic departments are located in the building.

The College of Education, Health and Society was founded in 1902 as the first professional school of Miami University and one of the first teacher education schools in Ohio. It was originally called the Ohio State Normal School. The Ohio legislature authorized its establishment "to provide proper theoretical and practical training for all students desiring to prepare themselves for the work of teaching.
