= Upham Hall (Miami University) =

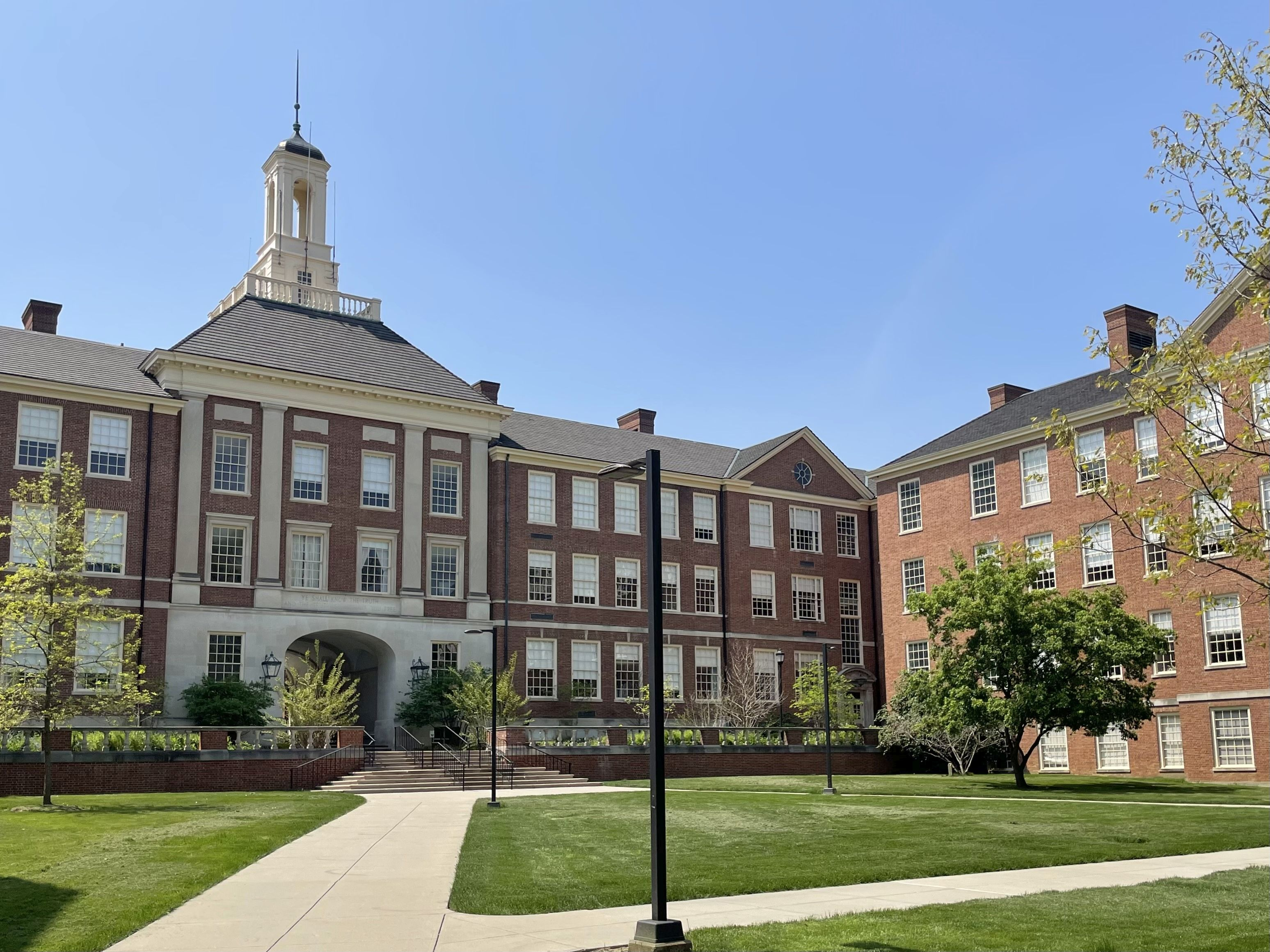
- Viewed from Bishop Circle
- Interactive map of Upham Hall

General information
- Type: Academic
- Architectural style: Georgian
- Location: 100 Bishop Woods, Oxford, Ohio 45056
- Coordinates: 39°30′31.23″N 84°43′59.42″W
- Completed: 1949 (central wing); 1950 (north wing); 1965 (south wing)

Design and construction
- Architects: C.F. Cellarius; Cellarius & Hilmer

Upham Hall is an academic building on the campus of Miami University in Oxford, Ohio, United States. It is located in the center of campus in the academic quad. Upham Hall is the home to departments of the university's College of Arts and Science. The Hefner Museum of Natural History, in the north wing of Upham, exhibits native and exotic organisms and covers biodiversity and ecological issues.

== History ==
Planning for a new classroom and laboratory building began in the mid-1940s in response to post–World War II enrollment growth. Upham Hall was named in honor of Alfred H. Upham, a member of the Miami class of 1897, who served the university as an instructor of Latin and Greek, professor of English, and president from 1928 to 1945. Construction on Upham Hall began on February 16, 1946, with the laying of the cornerstone in honor of Upham. The cornerstone contained time capsule materials, including a student directory, newspapers, a 1946 campus yearbook dedicated to Upham, and a photograph of the current president of Miami, Ernest H. Hahne.

The center section and part of the south wing were completed in 1949, followed by the north wing in 1950 and the remainder of the south wing in 1965. From its inception, the building was organized to serve multiple disciplines: the center section housed the English and history departments, while the north wing was designed for botany and zoology, and the south wing for geology and physics.

== Architecture ==
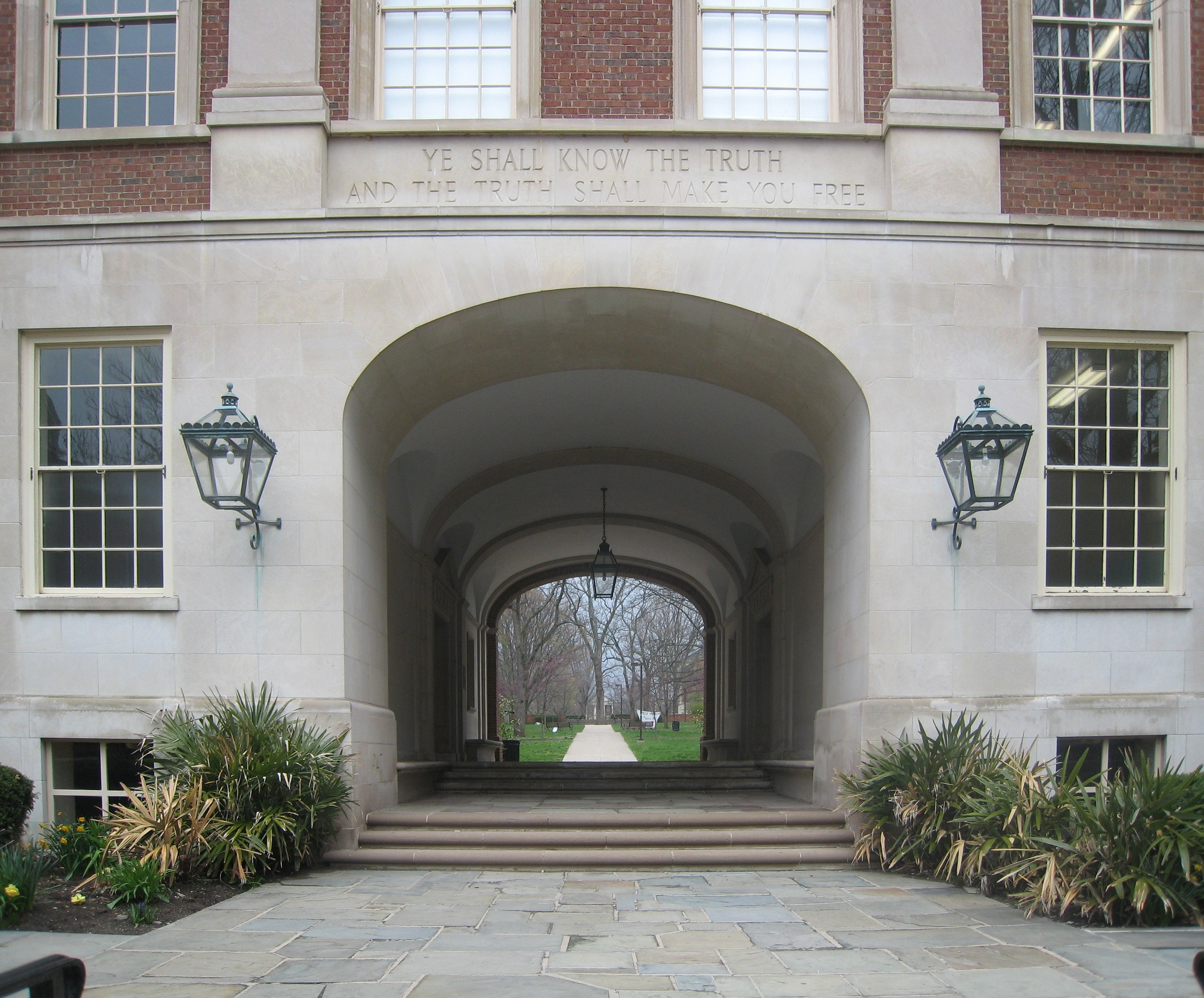
Upham Hall arch, looking west toward the academic quad

Upham Hall is a three-story building on a U-shaped footprint. It is built in the Georgian Revival architectural style. A central arch that passes through the center of the building, with the inscription "Ye shall know the truth and the truth shall make you free". On the building's courtyard side, stone tablets feature inscriptions of Percy MacKaye, Miami's poet in residence in the 1920s.

According to Miami legend, if you kiss your true love under the Upham Hall arch, you will marry, and the bond will never be broken. Related to the Upham Arch superstition are "Miami Mergers", married Miami graduates. On June 20, 2009, 1,087 couples renewed their wedding vows under the Upham Hall arch. This constituted a Guinness World Record for the most people renewing their wedding vows at once.
