= Miami University Middletown =

Campus of Miami University in Middletown, Ohio, US

- Type: Public satellite campus
- Established: 1966; 60 years ago
- Parent institution: Miami University
- Dean: Ande Durojaiye
- Students: 1,492
- Location: Middletown, Ohio, United States; 39.524°N 84.357°W
- Colors: Red and White
- Nickname: ThunderHawks
- Sporting affiliations: USCAA
- Mascot: Flash the ThunderHawk
- Website: miamioh.edu/regionals/

Miami University Middletown is a satellite campus of Miami University in Middletown, Ohio. Founded in 1966, it was the first regional campus established in Ohio. It is one of three regional campuses of Miami University, as well as the oldest.

== History ==
In 1946, Miami University began offering classes in Middletown and Hamilton to serve residents of those communities who were unable to attend college elsewhere. The success of these classes led to the establishment of five academic centers in Norwood, Dayton, Piqua, and the existing Hamilton and Middletown locations. Steady growth in student enrollment, along with strong local support for higher education, led to the opening of the permanent Miami University Middletown campus in 1966 and the Miami University Hamilton campus in 1968. The academic centers in Dayton and Piqua were eventually replaced by Wright State University, while the University of Cincinnati assumed responsibility for the Norwood center.

== Campus ==
- C. Eugene Bennett Recreation Center (Gym) — includes a fitness center and gymnasium
- Dave Finkelman Auditorium — 1963
- Gardner-Harvey Library — 1966, houses the library and computer lab.
- Johnston Hall — 1966, named after Logan T. Johnston; houses Office of Admission, Academic Advising, Career Services, Hawk Haven Dining, Center for Diversity Equity, and Inclusion, One Stop for Student Success, Counseling and Disability Services, Tutoring and Learning Center, Cincinnati State Middletown offices
- Levey Hall — named after Barry J. Levey; houses science labs, the Department of Biological Sciences and the English Language Center
- Thesken Hall — 1968, named after Earl V. Thesken former Dean of Educational Studies; houses the Department of Education and Society, Department of Engineering Technology and Miami Regionals online
- Verity Lodge — 1940, houses the head Start Childcare Center

== Academics ==
Miami University Middletown is a small, primarily nonresidential teaching university with a focus on undergraduate studies. The College of Liberal Arts and Applied Science is an academic division of Miami University housed entirely at Miami University Hamilton and consists of twelve academic departments. The university offers 31 majors and 10 minors.

== Athletics ==
Miami University Middletown is home of the Miami Middletown ThunderHawks. The ThunderHawks field competitive teams in women's basketball, volleyball; baseball, and basketball for men. Miami Middletown participates in the United States Collegiate Athletic Association with other regional campuses of Ohio universities including the Miami University Hamilton Harriers. As of 2026, Miami University Middletown has announced that all athletic programs will be discontinued following the conclusion of their upcoming seasons.
