= Alexander McGuffey =

Scottish American scout (1767–1855)

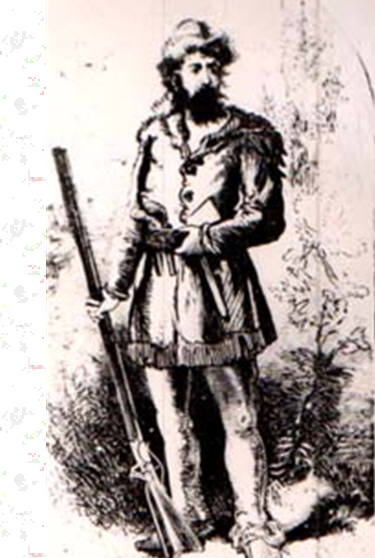
Samuel Brady who taught and tested McGuffey and Duncan McArthur to be scouts and fighters

Alexander McGuffey (November 22, 1767 – March 1, 1855), was a Scottish American scout on the Ohio frontier during the Northwest Indian War. He was the father of William Holmes and Alexander Hamilton McGuffey, who edited the McGuffey Readers. Their mother Anna Holmes McGuffey provided their earliest education and ensured that they received a good formal education outside of their home.

== Early years ==
Alexander McGuffey was born on November 22, 1767, in Wigtownshire in the southwestern corner of Scotland. His parents were Ann McKittrick and William McGuffey. Nicknamed "Scotch Billy", his father was a farmer and a clobber, which could mean that he painted pottery to look like oriental ceramics or that he repaired shoes with glue. When McGuffey was five or six years old, his family immigrated to Colonial America. They landed in Philadelphia in August 1774 and then established a farm in York County, Pennsylvania.

On May 27, 1779, McGuffey joined the Continental Army during the American Revolutionary War (1775–1783). More than half of the soldiers were believed to have been Scottish-Irish men, who had a "deep seated hatred of the British".

During William's absence, the family continued to farm the land and they opened and operated a tavern. George Washington and his officers visited the tavern several times during the war. McGuffey was used to seeing soldiers and he learned about the war by listening to conversations amongst the tavern's patrons. At the end of the war, William McGuffey returned to run the farm. He also managed the tavern and he began cobbling shoes.

In 1789, the McGuffey family set off on the Cumberland Road, likely in Conestoga wagons, for western Pennsylvania, which had just been opened for settlement. Williams's 18-year-old daughter Elizabeth died and was buried along the trail. McGuffey and his 21-year-old sister Catherine completed the journey with their parents to Washington County, Pennsylvania. The family ran a farm in Finley Township near Claysville. Land was cheap there and Scottish-Irish settlers were finding success as farmers and makers of iron and whiskey. Buffalo, deer, otter, beaver, small game, and turkeys were ample sources of food and animal furs. The McGuffeys identified themselves as Covenanters who supported a Presbyterian Church of Scotland. They were against drinking, slavery, and dancing. They were also against governmental and church regulations.

== Scout ==
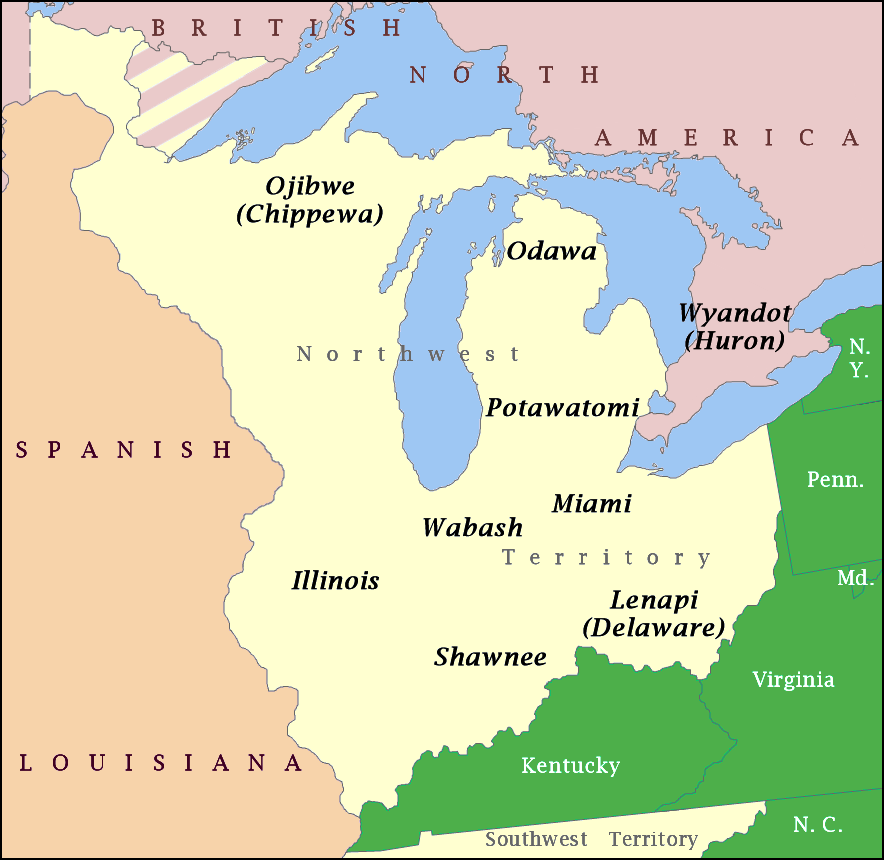
Map of Native tribes of the Northwestern Confederacy in the Northwest Territory

Native American tribes of the Northwestern Confederacy—including Ojibwas, Odawas, Potawatomis, Miamis, Delawares, Shawnees, and Senecas (originally of New York and Ontario)—raided settlements in Western Pennsylvania and throughout the Northwest Territory. Boats transporting freight from Pittsburgh to Cincinnati along the Ohio River were subject to attack.

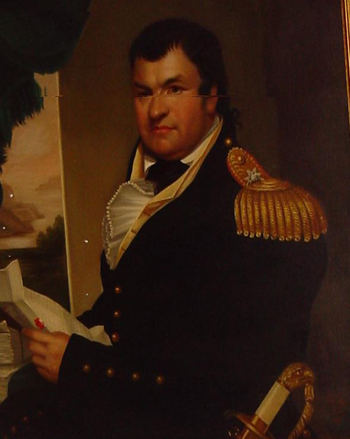
Duncan McArthur, McGuffey's best friend and fellow scout, when he was the Governor of Ohio

In 1790, McGuffey and his best friend Duncan McArthur volunteered to be scouts at Fort Pitt, an American Army stronghold. Samuel Brady trained and tested their ability to hunt, shoot, run, and swim. They were also tested on their ability to spy on tribesmen and how they would manage confrontations with Native Americans. Both Duncan and McGuffey were accepted and sent out on military expeditions. They were outfitted in a homespun suit, buckskin leggings, and a jerkin, and they were given a tomahawk and a dirk. The tomahawk was used to cut trees to create a shelter and to cut their way through the forests of Ohio and Pennsylvania. McGuffey first served out of a small fort near Wheeling, West Virginia, and operated in the Ohio River Valley.

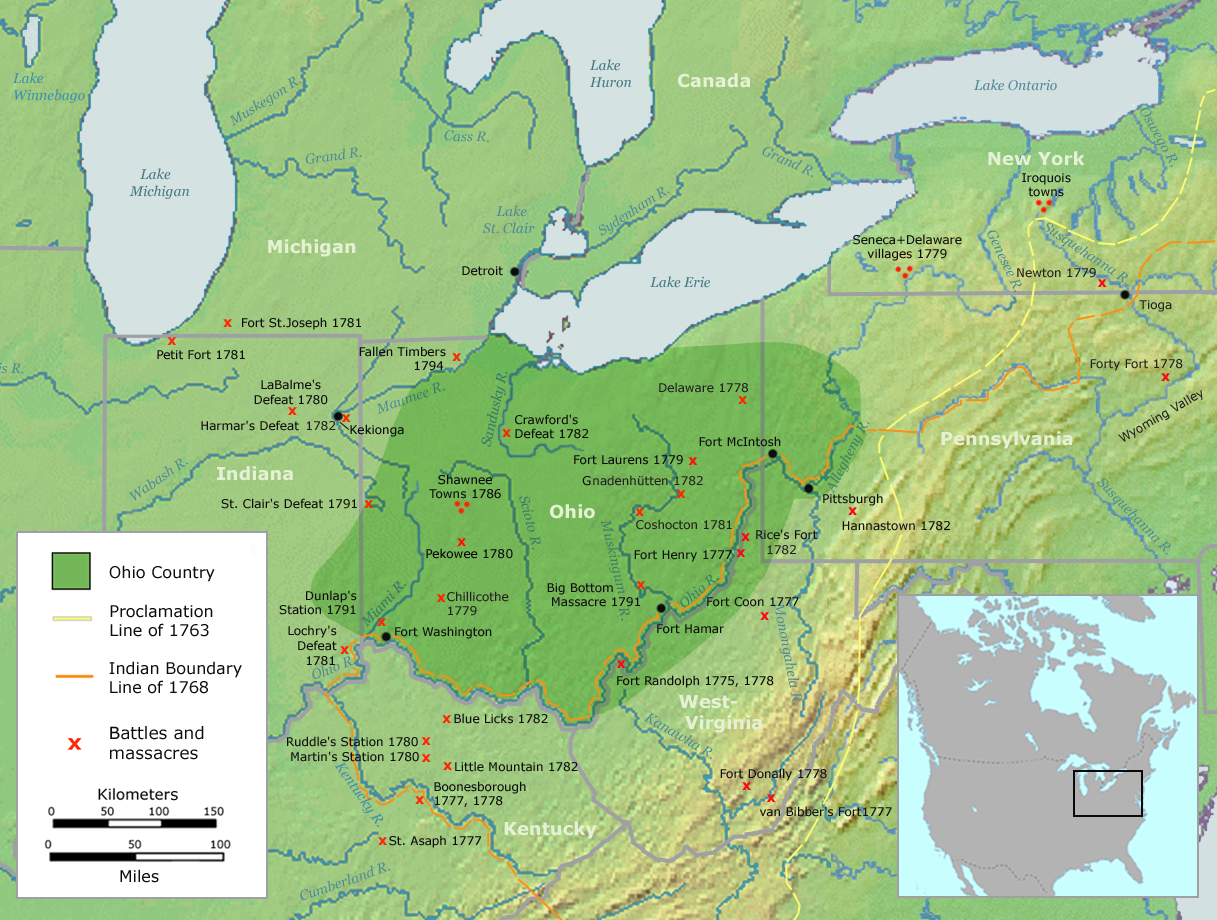
Ohio Country with battles and massacres between 1775 and 1794

In the early 1790s, the young men served under General Anthony Wayne and Arthur St. Clair, with the objective to push Native Americans out of the Ohio Territory. Being a scout was dangerous, they could be killed or scalped. McGuffy had a number of close calls, once a shot just missed him and penetrated the tree that he was standing behind. Another time, a shot hit his powder horn, but missed him. Other close calls were when he was spotted by a number of Native Americans and he ran away, until they covered a great distance and his pursuers finally gave up. McGuffey served until 1796.

McArthur served during the War of 1812 and attained the rank of general. He was elected governor of Ohio and established the "Fruit Hill" estate near Chillicothe, Ohio.

== Life ==
=== Washington County, Pennsylvania ===
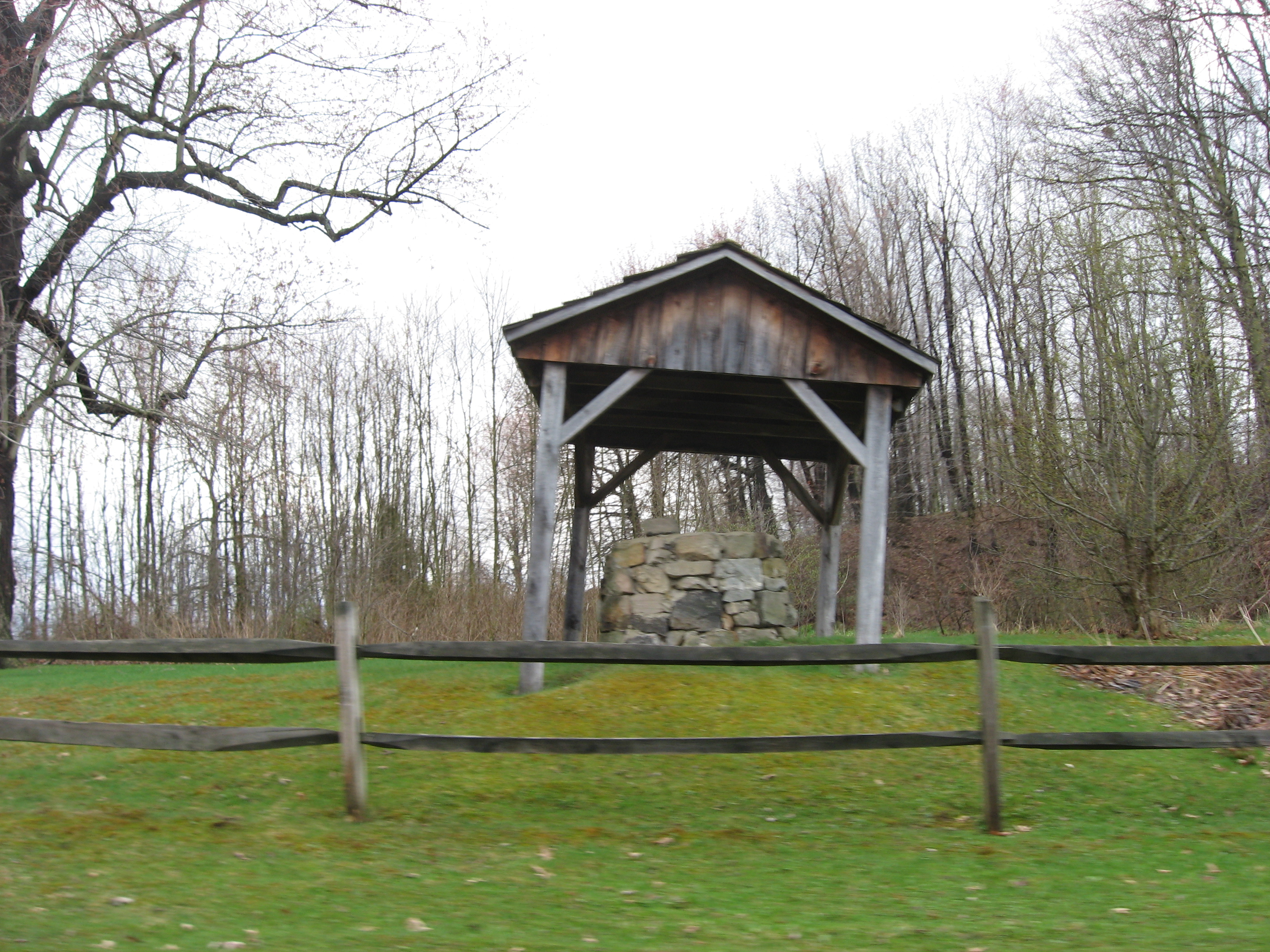
William H. McGuffey Boyhood Home Site is snow a part of a nature preserve and has been declared a National Historic Landmark. A small structure and fence at the William H. McGuffey Boyhood Home Site, located in northwestern Coitsville Township, Ohio, United States.

In December 1797, McGuffey married Anna Holmes (born 1776), whose parents were Jane Roney Holmes and Henry Holmes of the "Rural Grove" farm in Washington County. (Note: Watson states that the couple was married in 1794.) The Holmes were among the wealthiest Scotch–Irish in the county. Jane was educated in the frontier school system. McGuffey and his wife built a log cabin on the Rural Grove farm and they lived there for five years. (Note: In 1928, the cabin was disassembled and moved to Henry Fords outdoor museum in Dearborn, Michigan, where it was put back together. The site of the 70-acre farm was established as a memorial to William Holmes McGuffey.) During that time, the couple had three children Jane (born 1799), William Holmes (born 1800), and Henry (born 1802).

McGuffey was a farmer. He also built houses, roads, and bridges. He managed the repercussions of droughts, floods, pests, and wild animals on the frontier.

In 1789, Washington County had about 1,540 residents, 840 of whom were enslaved people. (Note: In 1780, Pennsylvania enacted a law, An Act for the Gradual Abolition of Slavery to abolish slavery over time.) The county's Scot-Irish residents were either aristocratic Presbyterians or conservative Covenanters. They had different opinions about slavery, alcohol consumption, politics (Federalists vs. Jeffersonians), and morals. They took opposing sides during the Whiskey Rebellion (1791–1794). The McGuffeys were Covenanters.

The McGuffey family were opposed to drinking but probably didn't care for taxation by the Federal government. Still, they were fiercely patriotic to the Federal government and would expect the government to help with things like protection and roads. For the McGuffeys as well as many Scotch–Irish, armed rebellion against the American government was wrong, especially if it was the army of George Washington. They appeared to have been ambivalent on the question of slavery, not unlike most of the Scotch-Irish.

— William McGuffey: Mentor to American Industry.

=== Connecticut Western Reserve in Ohio ===
==== Background ====
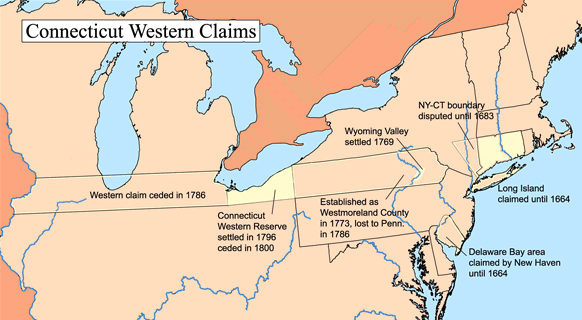
Connecticut Western Reserve, the Ohio portion of the reserve is the yellow area south of Lake Erie and between present-day Pennsylvania and Indiana

The first European settlers began moving into the area in 1798. McGuffey began clearing the land and building a log cabin in 1800. The area had a great source of game, nuts, and berries. The land was flatter than western Pennsylvania, which made for easier cultivation of crops, like potatoes, squash, beans, corn, oats, and wheat. The community included Pennsylvania Germans anabaptists, who shared improved farming methods, and New Englanders of conservative Puritan stock, who shared how to tap trees for syrup and build gristmills. Quakers and Scotch–Irish also moved into the diverse community. The community of varying backgrounds, had a hatred of war, slavery, and drunkenness. They had shared values, such as providing children good educations.

Children in the community were taught to read, write and spell, and memorize verses using the Bible and other books. Some children were taught using The New England Primer and Webster's Blue Back Speller. Children's books and novels were used by some to teach reading and spelling, such as The History of Little Goody Two-Shoes, Mother Goose's Melody, The Pilgrim's Progress, Robinson Crusoe and Gulliver's Travels.

==== The McGuffeys ====
In 1802, the McGuffeys left Washington County with their three children and his parents, William and Ann McGuffey. They bought a 160-acre farm in the village of Coitsville, Ohio, of the Connecticut Western Reserve, near and east of Youngstown. (Note: Some sources state that they lived in the village of Cortsville, Ohio (southwestern Ohio) and/or Trumbull County, Ohio (north of Youngstown). Trumbull County was a large county established in 1800 for the Connecticut Western Reserve areas in Ohio, including Coitsville. It went west from the Pennsylvania-Ohio state border and was later subdivided into 14 counties, including Coitsville Township, Ohio.) McGuffey sat on the local school board, was a "house appraiser", and was a "lister of property". Anna homeschooled their children. During the winter, William and Jane boarded and attended Rev. William Wick's school in Youngstown, about five miles from their house. (Note: Rev. William Wick was the father of William W. Wick.) They studied there until Wick's death in 1814.

William began teaching at the age of 14 and between teaching positions, he studied at Old Stone Academy in Darlington, Pennsylvania, where Rev. Thomas Hughes was the headmaster. William then helped his much younger brother Alexander attain an education. They both contributed to the creation of the successful McGuffey Readers textbooks for elementary education. His wife Anna died while the family was still in Ohio.

=== Shenango River, Pennsylvania ===
McGuffey returned to western Pennsylvania and lived along the Shenango River some time before 1847. He married Mary Hemphill Dickey, "a very estimable lady." McGuffey's parents Ann McKittrick and William McGuffey moved in with the couple. His mother Ann lived to the age of 90 and William lived to be 94.

On September 22, 1847, Daniel Drake of Cincinnati visited the McGuffeys at their Shenango River homestead. His daughter Elizabeth M. Drake married McGuffey's son Alexander. Drake, who was 62 years of age at the time, founded the first medical college west of the Alleghenies. Like the McGuffeys, Daniel Drake and his parents had experienced struggles on the frontier, and Dan was sent to Cincinnati in 1800 to receive an education. He became a physician and lived in comfort. His and McGuffey's grandchildren lived a life of luxury and attended private schools.

== Death and legacy ==
McGuffey died on March 1, 1855, in Mercer County, Pennsylvania.

In 1847, Drake visited McGuffey and they talked about his days as a scout. Afterwards, Drake wrote a short biography of McGuffey's life. He shared the biography and his thoughts about his life with their shared grandchildren:

Now, my Petit-fils, while you know personally one of your grand-fathers, you have a short biography of the other. I hope you will read it attentively, and in doing so, you will learn a few things that may be useful to you.

First, that a great deal of active exercise makes a person strong, swift, healthy and of long life.
Second, that when there is danger, as was the case when your grand-father was young, you should not fear it, but go straight ahead, and try to overcome it.
Third, that for men to be esteemed they must be honest and fear God.

This, as I was told, was the character of your grandfather and his neighbors loved and respected him because of it.

— Daniel Drake (Note: Petit-fils means grandson.)

== Sources ==
- Ruggles, Alice McGuffey Morrill (1938). "The Father of the McGuffeys". Ohio Archaeological and Historical Quarterly – via Ohio History Journal, Ohio History Connection.
- Skrabec, Quentin R. (2009). William McGuffey: Mentor to American Industry. Algora Publishing. ISBN 978-0-87586-726-7.
