= William H. McGuffey Boyhood Home Site =

- McGuffey, William H., Boyhood Home Site
- U.S. National Register of Historic Places
- U.S. National Historic Landmark
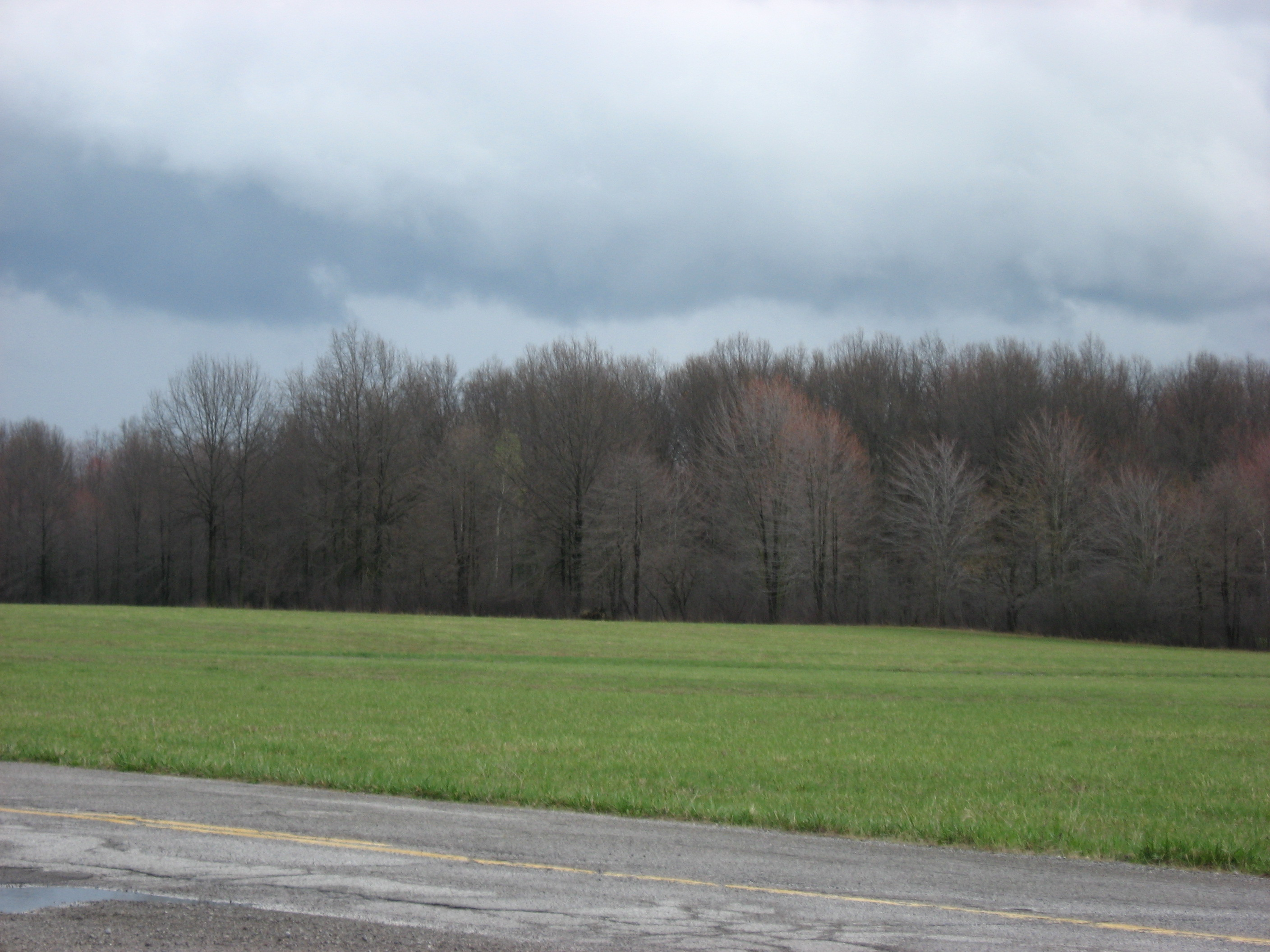
- Overview of the site

- Location within Ohio Location within the United States
- Location: 4505 McGuffey Road, Coitsville Township, Ohio
- Coordinates: 41°6′57″N 80°33′31″W
- Area: 73 acres (30 ha)
- Built: 1802
- NRHP reference No.: 66000617

Significant dates
- Added to NRHP: October 15, 1966
- Designated NHL: May 23, 1966

The William H. McGuffey Boyhood Home Site is a National Historic Landmark in Mahoning County, Ohio. It is the location where William H. McGuffey (1800-1873), lived for much of his youth. McGuffey is best known as the creator of the McGuffey Readers, a hugely popular set of educational primers. The site, now a regional park known as the McGuffey Wildlife Preserve, was designated a National Historic Landmark in 1966.

== Description and history ==
The William H. McGuffey Boyhood Home Site is located in a rural setting of northwestern Coitsville Township east of Youngstown, on the south side of McGuffey Road east of Ohio State Route 616. It is a basically rectangular parcel about 73 acres (30 ha) in size. The parcel is basically flat, with a low ridge running north-south in its eastern part. The original log cabin built by Alexander McGuffey was probably located on that ridge, but there is scholarly disagreement over its precise location.

The original 165.5-acre (67.0 ha) property was first occupied by the McGuffey family as early as 1802, but the family did not purchase it until 1814. William McGuffey was born in Pennsylvania in 1800, and spent his youth on this property. McGuffey was a prominent proponent of public school education, and taught at Miami University for many years. While there, he published his series of McGuffey Readers, a series of grade school educational texts that were so widely used that they rivalled The Bible in sales.

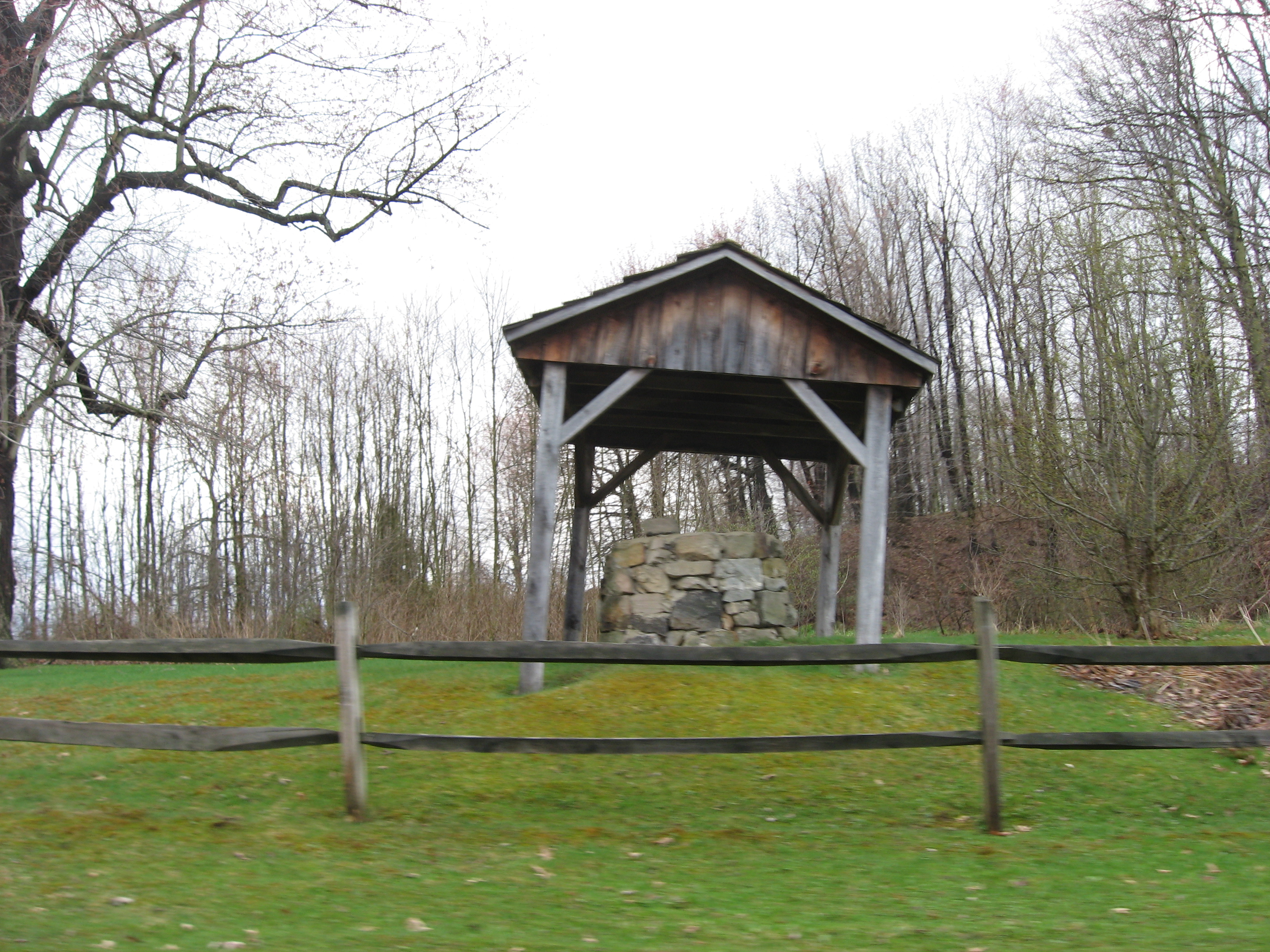
A structure at the site

The 73-acre property of the McGuffey homestead that has survived subdivision was acquired by a nonprofit organization around the time it was designated a National Historic Landmark in 1966, and was donated to the county for use as a nature preserve in 1998. The property has hiking trails open to the public.

== See also ==
- William H. McGuffey House
- List of National Historic Landmarks in Ohio
