= Alexander Hamilton McGuffey =

American lawyer

Alexander Hamilton McGuffey (August 13, 1816 – June 3, 1896) was an editor of the fifth and sixth of the series of McGuffey Readers. His brother William Holmes McGuffey edited the first four readers in the series. Alexander McGuffey began his career as an educator, before becoming a lawyer. He was secretary and treasurer of the Trustees of Cincinnati College, responsible for pulling the institution out of debt after poor financial practices and two significant fires.

== Early life and education ==
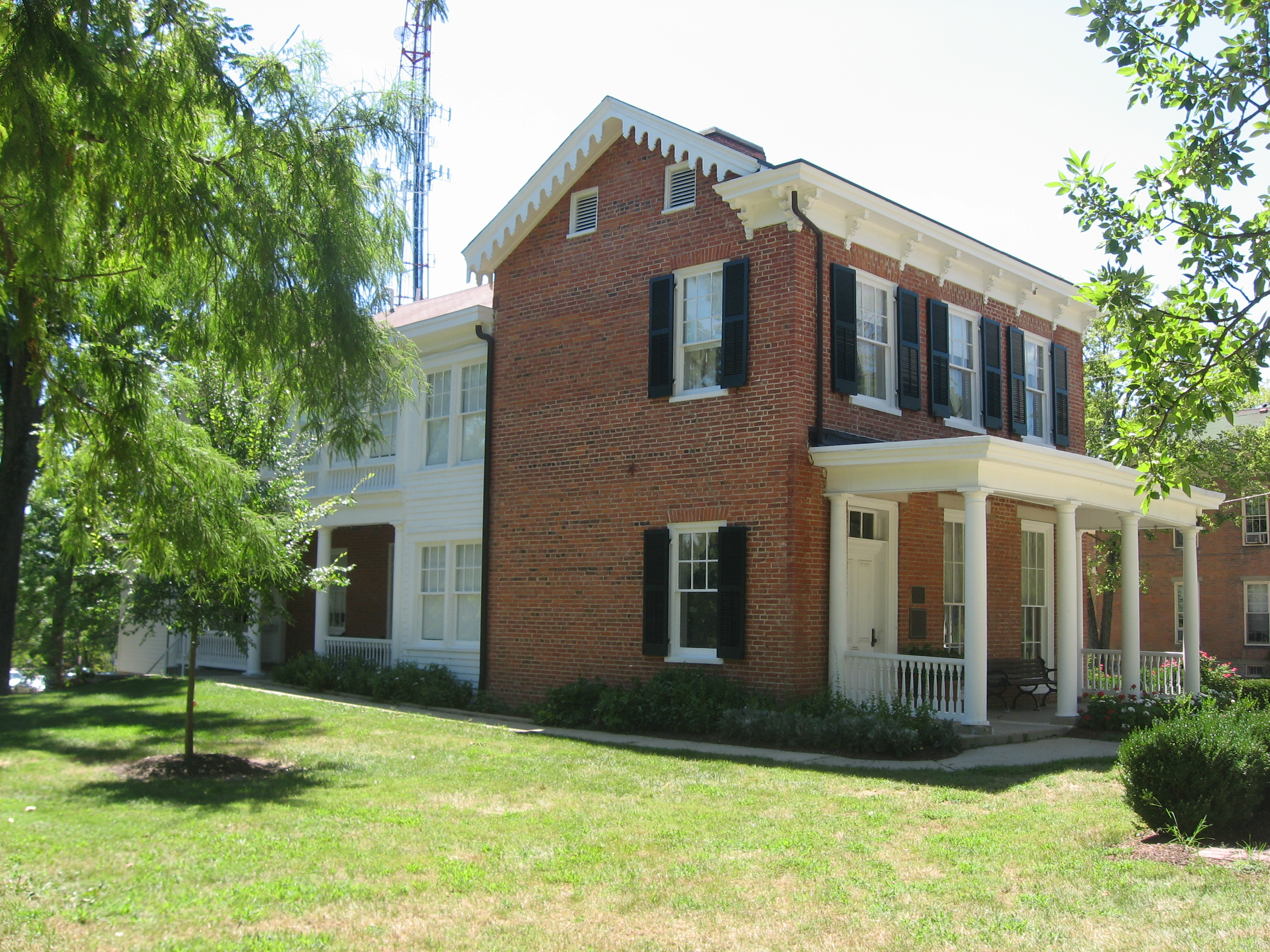
William H. McGuffey House in Oxford, Ohio, where Alexander lived while attaining an education. It is a museum and National Historic Landmark.

Alexander Hamilton McGuffy was born in Trumbull County, Ohio on August 13, 1816. His parents were intellectual, refined Scottish people. When he was nine or ten years old, he was placed under the care of his twenty-six-year-old brother William Holmes McGuffey. He lived at his brother's house in Oxford, Ohio, where he studied Hebrew. At the age of sixteen, he graduated from Miami University, attending the school from 1826 to 1831.

== Career ==
He taught Stanley Matthews and his siblings and boarded at the Matthews home, which was near the house of Dr. Lyman Beecher. McGuffey was friends with Harriet Beecher Stowe.

He was hired by Woodward College in Cincinnati to be a professor of Belles-lettres. Within a few years he became the chair of the Ancient Languages department at Woodward. His brother William was also a professor at Woodland College.

He chose to become a lawyer and was admitted to the Cincinnati bar when he was twenty-one years of age. His office was near that of Salmon P. Chase. He entered into a law partnership with his son-in-law Henry Albert Morrill in 1869. Morrill married Anna McGuffey in 1867.

Winthrop B. Smith planned to publish a series of elementary English text books, known as the McGuffey Readers. They were written by the McGuffey brothers, William and Alexander. William wrote the first four readers, and was believed to have had assistance from Alexander McGuffey, who wrote the Fifth and Sixth Reader. He entered into a contract with W. B. Smith on September 30, 1841, to create a rhetorical reading book. The McGuffey’s Rhetorical Guide or Fifth Reader of the Eclectic Series was published in 1844.

In 1845, McGuffey became secretary and treasurer of the Trustees of Cincinnati College when the institution was in debt and had suffered fires that gutted the school building. After several years, he had eliminated the school's debt. He was then the President of the Board of Trustees of the Miami Medical College and Director of McMicken University.

== Personal life ==
He was married to Elizabeth M. Drake, the daughter of Dr. Daniel Drake, with whom he had children. After Elizabeth's death, he married Caroline V. Rich of Buston, with whom he had three children. McGuffey lived in Cincinnati and was an Episcopalian until his death on June 4, 1896. (Note: Bishop states that McGuffey died on June 6, 1896, but a June 4, 1896 edition of a newspaper said that he died June 3.) When he died, he was survived by his wife and nine children.

== Legacy ==
His tastes led him to seek the quieter walks of business, and the greater part of his life was spent in chamber practice as a counselor, especially in the management of trusts and the settlement of estates. He was methodical and extremely accurate, conducting business with systematic thoroughness. In arguments he was logical and keen rather than oratorical, and took pleasure in the analysis of strictly legal questions rather than in appeals to a jury.

— Hon. J. D. Cox, Memorial speech read before the Trustees of Cincinnati College
