= Coitsville Township, Ohio =

Township in Ohio, US

- Township
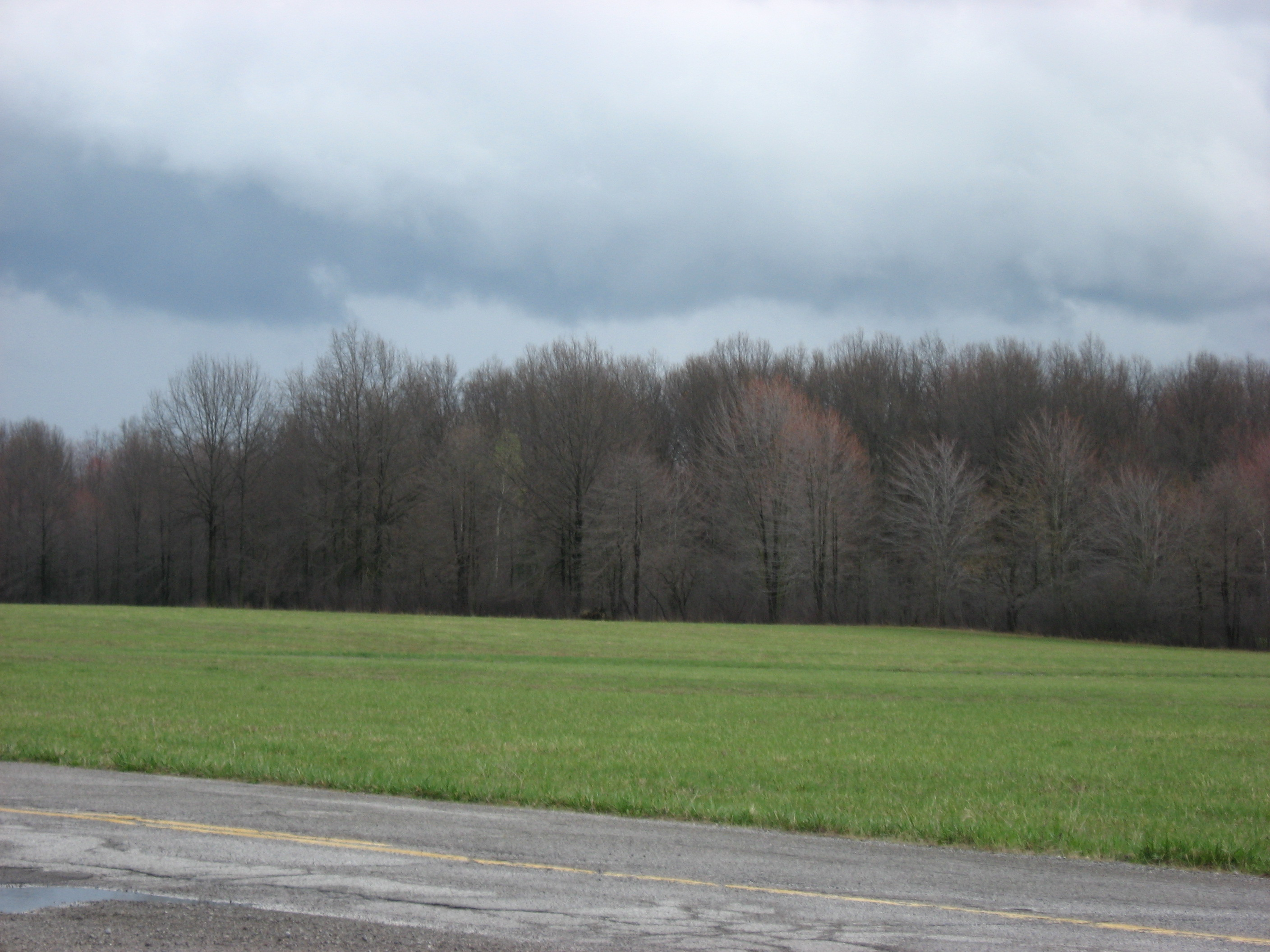
- Fields at the McGuffey Homesite in northwestern Coitsville Township

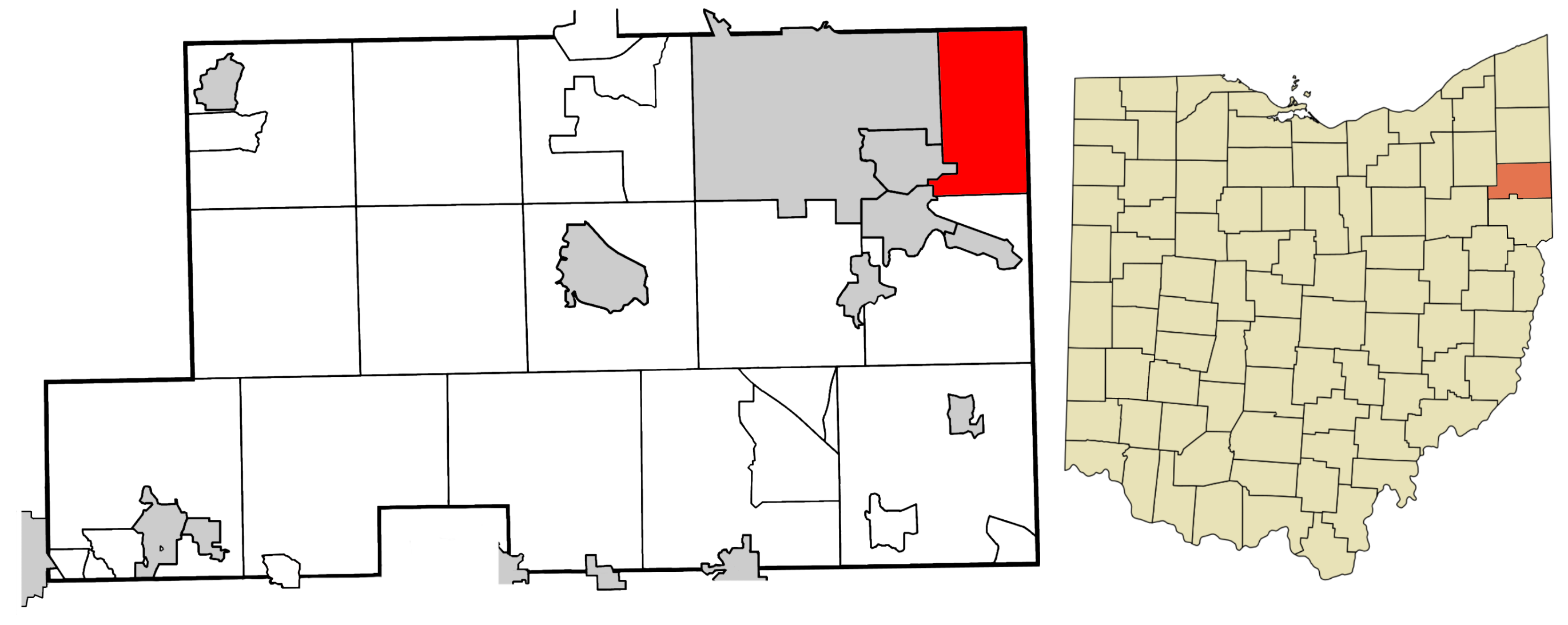
- Location of Coitsville Township in Mahoning County
- Coordinates: 41°4′56″N 80°33′21″W
- Country: United States
- State: Ohio
- County: Mahoning

Area
  - Total: 12.9 sq mi (33.4 km^{2})
  - Land: 12.8 sq mi (33.2 km^{2})
  - Water: 0.077 sq mi (0.2 km^{2})
- Elevation: 1,112 ft (339 m)

Population (2020)
  - Total: 1,264
  - Density: 98.6/sq mi (38.1/km^{2})
- Time zone: UTC-5 (Eastern (EST))
  - Summer (DST): UTC-4 (EDT)
- ZIP code: 44436
- Area codes: 234/330
- FIPS code: 39-16476
- GNIS feature ID: 1086561
- Website: https://coitsvilletwp.org/

Coitsville Township is one of the fourteen townships of Mahoning County, Ohio, United States. The 2020 census found 1,264 people in the township.

== Geography ==
Located in the northeastern corner of the county along the Pennsylvania border, it borders the following townships:

- Hubbard Township, Trumbull County - north
- Shenango Township, Mercer County, Pennsylvania - northeast
- Pulaski Township, Lawrence County, Pennsylvania - east
- Poland Township - south
- Youngstown - west

The western half of what was originally Coitsville Township is now occupied by three cities:

- The city of Campbell, in the west
- Part of the city of Struthers, in the southwest
- Part of Youngstown, in the northwest

== Name and history ==
Coitsville Township is named for Daniel Coit of the Connecticut Land Company. There is no evidence he ever lived in Coitsville, but in 1798 he sent a survey party and a land agent to Coitsville. The first Euro-American settler, Amos Loveland, came in 1798 and by 1801 settlers started coming in large numbers. Alexander McGuffey, one of the early settlers in Coitsville, moved there with his family from Washington County, Pennsylvania around 1800. His son, William Holmes McGuffey, received his common school education in Coitsville and later wrote the popular McGuffey Readers.

With excellent soil for farming in Coitsville Township, agriculture was the main occupation for many of the early settlers. In 1807 or 1808, the settlers built the first school house, a little log building in the northeastern part of Coitsville Township. In the early years, there were several sawmills and a gristmill in Coitsville; two stores, a tannery, and two blacksmith shops were eventually added to the township.

It is the only Coitsville Township statewide.

== Government ==
The township is governed by a three-member board of trustees, who are elected in November of odd-numbered years to a four-year term beginning on the following January 1. Two are elected in the year after the presidential election and one is elected in the year before it. There is also an elected township fiscal officer, who serves a four-year term beginning on April 1 of the year after the election, which is held in November of the year before the presidential election. Vacancies in the fiscal officership or on the board of trustees are filled by the remaining trustees.

== Media ==
Coitsville Township is served by the Hometown Journal, a local weekly newspaper.
