= William Wick =

- Born: William Walter Wick; June 29, 1768; Southampton, Long Island, New York
- Died: March 29, 1815 (aged 46); Hopewell Township, Pennsylvania
- Occupation: Presbyterian minister
- Years active: 1799–1815
- Known for: First minister in Connecticut Western Reserve, educator of William Holmes McGuffey
- Spouse: Elizabeth McFarland
- Children: Five daughters and eight sons, including William W. Wick (son)

William Wick (June 29, 1768 – March 29, 1815) was Presbyterian minister and schoolmaster in the frontier of Washington County, Pennsylvania, and the Connecticut Western Reserve (Western Reserve) in Ohio. His son, William W. Wick was a U.S. representative from Indiana and the secretary of state of Indiana.

== Early life and education ==
William Walter Wick was born on June 29, 1768, in Southampton, Long Island, New York. He was the son of Lemuel Wick (1743–1813) and Deborah Lupton (1751–1809). Lemuel was a lieutenant of the 5th company, 2nd Battalion, Suffolk County, New York militia in 1775. He was born in Southampton and died in Morristown, New Jersey. Both Lemuel and Deborah Wick were buried in the Southampton Cemetery in New York.

He grew up in New York City. In 1790, he left for Washington County, Pennsylvania with his father's family. He was a farmer, but became interested in studying to become a minister after meeting Rev. John McMillan. He attended Jefferson College (now Washington & Jefferson College) in Canonsburg, Pennsylvania and graduated in 1797. He then studied theology under Rev. McMillan. Wick was well-versed in the Latin, Greek, and Hebrew languages.

== Marriage and children ==
On April 21, 1794, Wick married Elizabeth McFarland, (Note: Johnson states that he was married on April 21, 1791.) the daughter of Colonel Daniel McFarland (1731–1817), an officer in the Continental Army. In 1778, he commanded the Pennsylvania Rangers in Ohio and Monongahela country. Elizabeth was well-educated, gracious, and welcoming. It was said that she had "strong faith, clear views, deeply pious, [and] had more than ordinary perseverance."

He and his wife had five daughters and eight sons, many of whom died at a young age. Eliza, Phebe, and Calvin made it to adulthood. Their son, William (known as "W"), was born in Canonsburg, Washington County, Pennsylvania.

He moved his family to the Youngstown area in 1800, and he had a cabin by September 1800. In Youngstown, Wick's residence was on Federal Street. On one side was the Presbyterian Church and his brother Henry's residence and store were on the other side. In 1801, Rev. Wick purchased a farm in Coitsville, Ohio.

His brother Henry Wick ran a mercantile business in Washington County, and then followed his brother to Youngstown where he established a residence and a store. He also purchased 37 acres of land just out of town. Samuel Bryson and Henry were the first merchants in Youngstown.

== Career ==
=== Frontier pastor ===
Wick was ordained as a Presbyterian minister by the Presbytery of Ohio on August 28, 1799, and then headed out for the present-day city of Youngstown, Ohio. (Note: He was also said to have been ordained on September 3, 1800.) William Wick was one of the first two ministers to settle in the territory of the Western Reserve, the other being a Congregational pastor by the name of Joseph Badger.

On September 1, 1799, he held a worship service for a group of settlers, which was probably the first church service held for whites in Youngstown, as well as in the Western Reserve. He is also said to have founded the First Presbyterian Church of Youngstown, Ohio on that day.

He was the pastor of the Hopewell and later out of Hopewell some congregants formed Neshannock Presbyterian Churches in Lawrence County, Pennsylvania from 1799 to 1801. During that time he traveled back to Youngstown for some services, such as the marriage of Rebecca Bush and Stephen Baldwin on November 3, 1800. It was the first marriage in the Reserve. (Note: Wick may have been responsible for the Youngstown church before 1801. Badger, who arrived in September or December 1800, stated that he arrived at Wick's cabin, who was assigned to the Hopewell, Neshannock and Youngstown churches at that time.) In May 1800, he established the Presbyterian Society in Youngstown. In 1801, he was assigned to the Hopewell and Youngstown churches, and he was assigned to both churches for 15 years. (Note: Kennedy states that he was assigned to the Hopewell and Youngstown churches on September 3, 1800.)

Until the church was built, services were held at Elder Caleb Baldwin's cabin or in a grove at the site of the current church. The log cabin church, located in Youngstown at Wood Street and Wick Avenue, was the oldest house of worship in the Reserve, (Note: The site of the log cabin church is adjacent to the current church building in Youngstown.) perhaps built in 1802 or 1805. The building was used as both a school and church for 30 years.

While leading the Youngstown church, he established the first formal religious organization in Poland, Ohio, on May 3, 1802. The first minister of the Poland church was a frontier missionary from Connecticut, Rev. Joseph Badger. Wick provided assistance in the founding of the Church of Christ in Warren on November 19, 1803. Wick was a missionary for the Connecticut Society and received his last commission for one year on January 17, 1815. He was connected with two Synods of the Trinity: the Synod of Pittsburgh and the Hartford Presbytery (later known as the Beaver Presbytery).

=== Educator ===
He taught school in the log cabin church of Hopewell in New Bedford (parents and grandparents buried in the graveyard), which was attended by William Holmes McGuffey and his sister Jane, who lived on a farm about five miles away in Coitsville, Ohio. William and Jane studied and boarded with the Wick family during the winter months, when they were not needed to work on the farm. William studied Latin, and perhaps Greek and Hebrew, as preparation for studying theology. William studied under Wick until his death, when William was 14.

== Death ==
Having become very feeble, Wick delivered his last sermon on February 13, 1815, in Hopewell. When he was unable to leave his home, congregants came to his house to hear his sermon. He died in Hopewell on March 29, 1815, and was interred in Youngstown. His original gravestone stated that he was "a respectable and punctual member of the judicature of the church, lived much beloved and died much lamented." Elizabeth received one year's salary after Wick's death. Sometime afterwards, Elizabeth went to live with one of their daughters. She died about 1835.

== Sources ==
- Butler (Jr.), Joseph Green (1921). History of Youngstown and the Mahoning Valley, Ohio. American Historical Society.
- Daughters of the American Revolution (1925). Lineage Book. The Society. p. 335.
- Johnson, Hubert Rex (1925). A History of the Neshannock Presbyterian Church, New Wilmington, Pennsylvania. National Capital Press, Incorporated.
- Kennedy, William (May 2009). The Plan of Union. Applewood Books. ISBN 978-1-4290-1826-5.
- Skrabec, Quentin R. (2009). William McGuffey: Mentor to American Industry. Algora Publishing. p. 42. ISBN 978-0-87586-726-7.
- Wickham, Gertrude Van Rensselaer (1896). Memorial to the Pioneer Women of the Western Reserve. Woman's Department of the Cleveland Centennial Commission.
- Wiggins and McKillop, ed. (1875). Youngstown, Past and Present.
