= William J. Brown (Indiana politician) =

American politician (1805–1857)

William Brown

Member of the U.S. House of Representatives from Indiana's 5th district
- In office March 4, 1843 – March 3, 1845
- Preceded by: Andrew Kennedy
- Succeeded by: William W. Wick
- In office March 4, 1849 – March 3, 1851
- Preceded by: William W. Wick
- Succeeded by: Thomas A. Hendricks

Personal details
- Born: August 15, 1805 Washington, Kentucky, U.S.
- Died: March 18, 1857 (aged 51) Indianapolis, Indiana, U.S
- Party: Democratic

William John Brown (August 15, 1805 – March 18, 1857) was a U.S. representative from Indiana.

== Early life ==
Born August 15, 1805, near Washington, Kentucky, Brown moved to Clermont County, Ohio, in 1808 with his parents, who settled near New Richmond. He attended the common schools and Franklin Academy in Clermont County. He moved to Rushville, Indiana in 1821, studied law and was admitted to the bar in 1826, commencing practice in Rushville.

== Political career ==
Brown served as a member of the Indiana House of Representatives from 1829 to 1832. He worked as a prosecutor from 1831 to 1835, and then served as Secretary of State of Indiana from 1836 to 1840. He moved to Indianapolis, Indiana in 1837 and was again a member of the Indiana House of Representatives from 1841 to 1843.

He was elected as a Democrat to the Twenty-eighth Congress (March 4, 1843 – March 3, 1845). He was appointed Second Assistant Postmaster General by President Polk and served in that capacity from 1845 until 1849.

Brown was elected to the Thirty-first Congress (March 4, 1849 – March 3, 1851). He was an unsuccessful candidate for renomination in 1850.

== Life after politics ==
Brown became chief editor of the Indianapolis Sentinel in 1850, working there until 1855. He served many times as chairman of the Democratic State central committee of Indiana. He was appointed by President Pierce as special agent of the Post Office Department for Indiana and Illinois, a position he held from 1853 until his death near Indianapolis, Indiana on March 18, 1857. He was interred in Crown Hill Cemetery.

U.S. House of Representatives
Preceded by Andrew Kennedy	Member of the U.S. House of Representatives from Indiana's 5th congressional district 1843–1845	Succeeded by William W. Wick
Preceded by William W. Wick	Member of the U.S. House of Representatives from Indiana's 5th congressional district 1849–1851	Succeeded by Thomas A. Hendricks
