= Hometown Journal =

Daily newspaper in Struthers, Ohio

The Hometown Journal
- Type: Weekly newspaper
- Format: Broadsheet
- Owner(s): The Hometown Journal Publishing Co. LLC
- Publisher: Nancy Johngrass
- Editor: Nancy Johngrass
- Founded: circa 1920
- Political alignment: Unbiased
- Headquarters: Home Savings and Loan Building, 32 State St. Suite 204, Struthers, OH 44471-1952
- Price: USD .35
- Website: http://www.hometownjournal.biz

The Hometown Journal is a weekly newspaper published in Struthers, Ohio and distributed nationally. It is owned by The Hometown Journal Publishing Co., LLC. The paper has had many transformations since its foundation at the turn of the 20th century, having once been known as the Lowellville Journal and most recently the Journal. The paper is often simply referred to as "The Journal" and specializes in community events of Struthers, Ohio, Campbell, Ohio, Lowellville, Ohio and Coitsville, Ohio, though it is known to feature news from much of Mahoning County, Ohio, the rest of the state, and parts of Western Pennsylvania. Its name was changed to the Hometown Journal in October 2006 after current publisher and owner Nancy Johngrass took control of the publication. Between the Struthers Journal and the Hometown Journal, subscribers missed only a few weeks of publication.

== Versions ==
The Journal is currently available in print, mailed as second-class periodical mail to thousands of subscribers. It is also distributed to about a dozen local businesses for individual purchase. Papers can also be purchased at the Hometown Journal office, 32 State St., Suite 204, Struthers.
