= McGuffey Art Center =

- U.S. National Register of Historic Places
- U.S. Historic district – Contributing property
- Virginia Landmarks Register
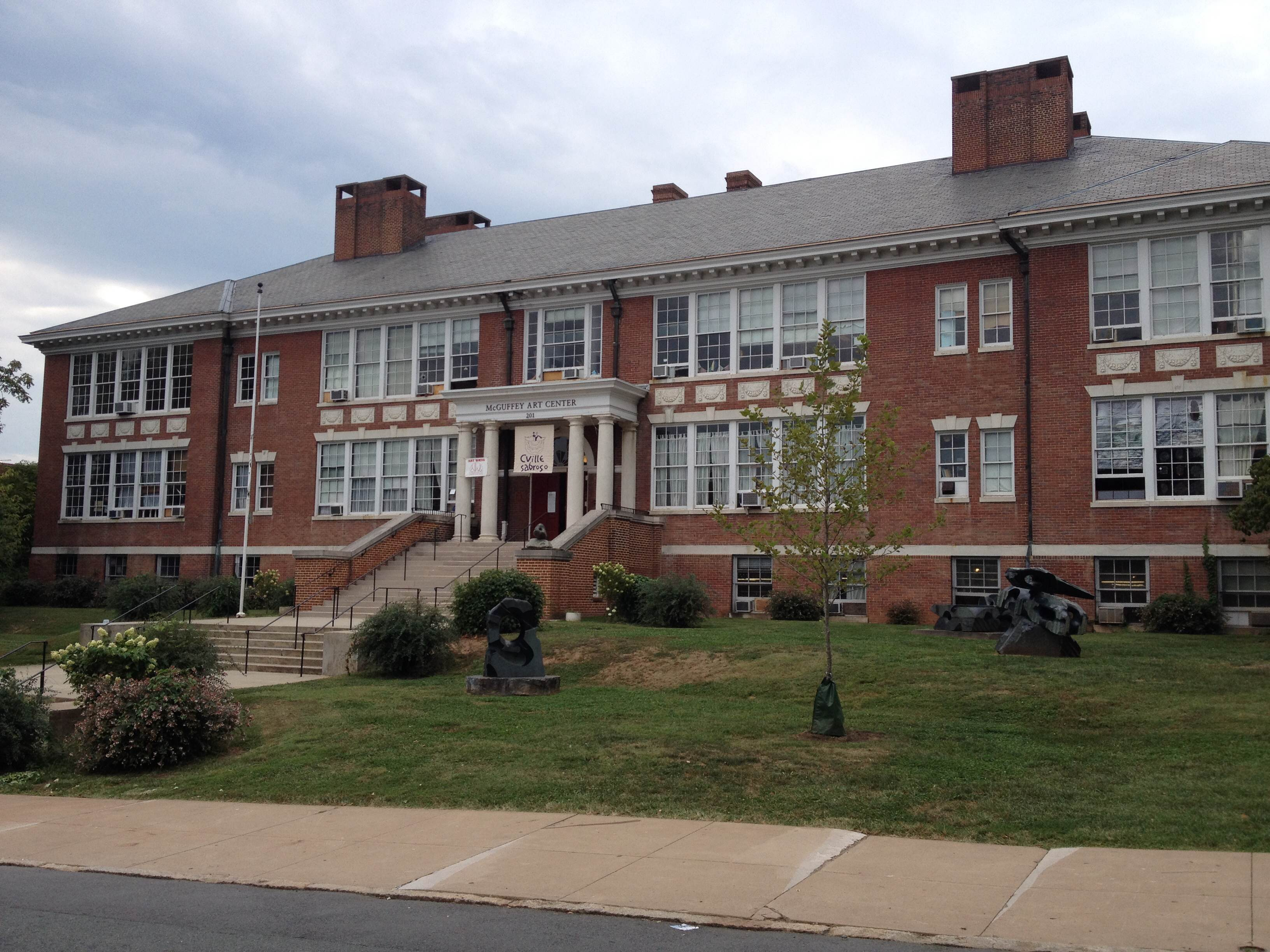
- Location: 201 2nd St. N.W., Charlottesville, Virginia
- Area: 1.9 acres (0.77 ha)
- Built: 1915-1916
- Architect: Johnson, Dr. James; Ferguson, Carlow and Taylor
- Architectural style: Colonial Revival
- NRHP reference No.: 09001156
- VLR No.: 104-0072-0300

Significant dates
- Added to NRHP: December 23, 2009
- Designated VLR: September 17, 2009

McGuffey Art Center (formerly William H. McGuffey Primary School), is an art center and historical former elementary school located in Charlottesville, Virginia.

== History ==
It was built in 1915–1916, and is a two-story, rectangular, Colonial Revival style brick building. It features single-story Tuscan order porticos that project from each side elevation as well as from the front façade. It is topped by a slate covered, low pitched, hipped roof. It was named for William Holmes McGuffey (1800-1873) the author of the first standard U.S. reader series who was a staunch advocate of public education and a University of Virginia professor of moral philosophy. McGuffey School ceased to be a public school in 1973.

In October 1975, the building reopened as an artist-run cooperative art center. The center features rotating exhibitions for local and national artists.

The building was listed on the National Register of Historic Places in 2009. It is located in the Charlottesville and Albemarle County Courthouse Historic District.
