= Abell–Gleason House =

Historic house in Virginia, United States

- U.S. National Register of Historic Places
- U.S. Historic district – Contributing property
- Virginia Landmarks Register
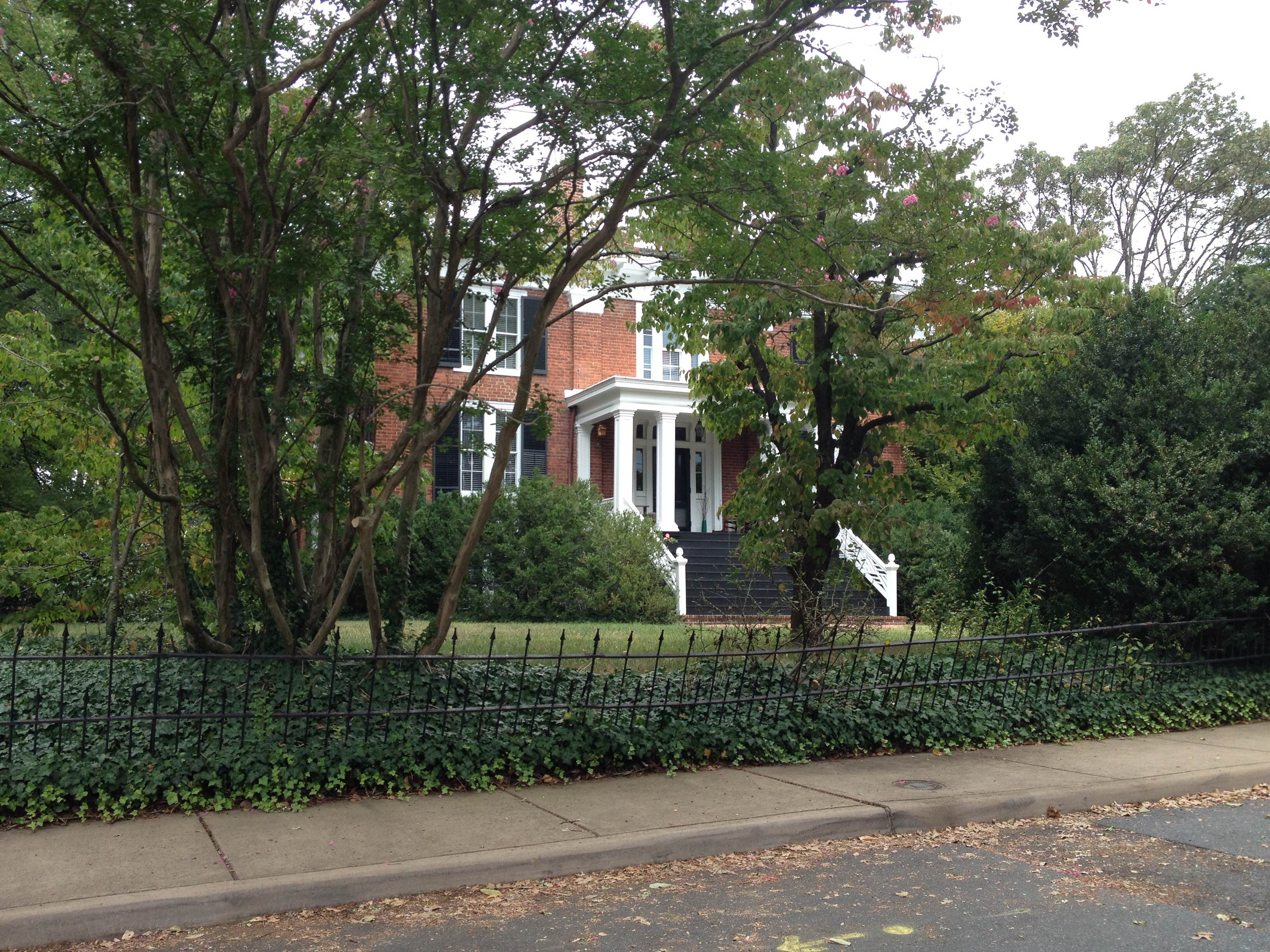

- Location within Virginia Location within the United States
- Location: 521 N. First St., Charlottesville, Virginia
- Coordinates: 38°02′07″N 78°28′47″W
- Area: 1 acre (0.40 ha)
- Built: 1859
- Architectural style: Greek Revival
- NRHP reference No.: 01000151
- VLR No.: 104-0008

Significant dates
- Added to NRHP: February 16, 2001
- Designated VLR: December 6, 2000

Abell–Gleason House is a historic home located at Charlottesville, Virginia. It was built in 1859 and is a two-story, three-bay, Greek Revival brick dwelling. Each of the bays is defined by brick pilasters with Doric order–inspired capitals faced with stucco. Also on the property is a contributing four-room servants quarters.

It was listed on the National Register of Historic Places in 2001. It is located in the Charlottesville and Albemarle County Courthouse Historic District.
