= Charlottesville and Albemarle County Courthouse Historic District =

Historic district in Virginia, United States

- U.S. National Register of Historic Places
- U.S. Historic district
- Virginia Landmarks Register
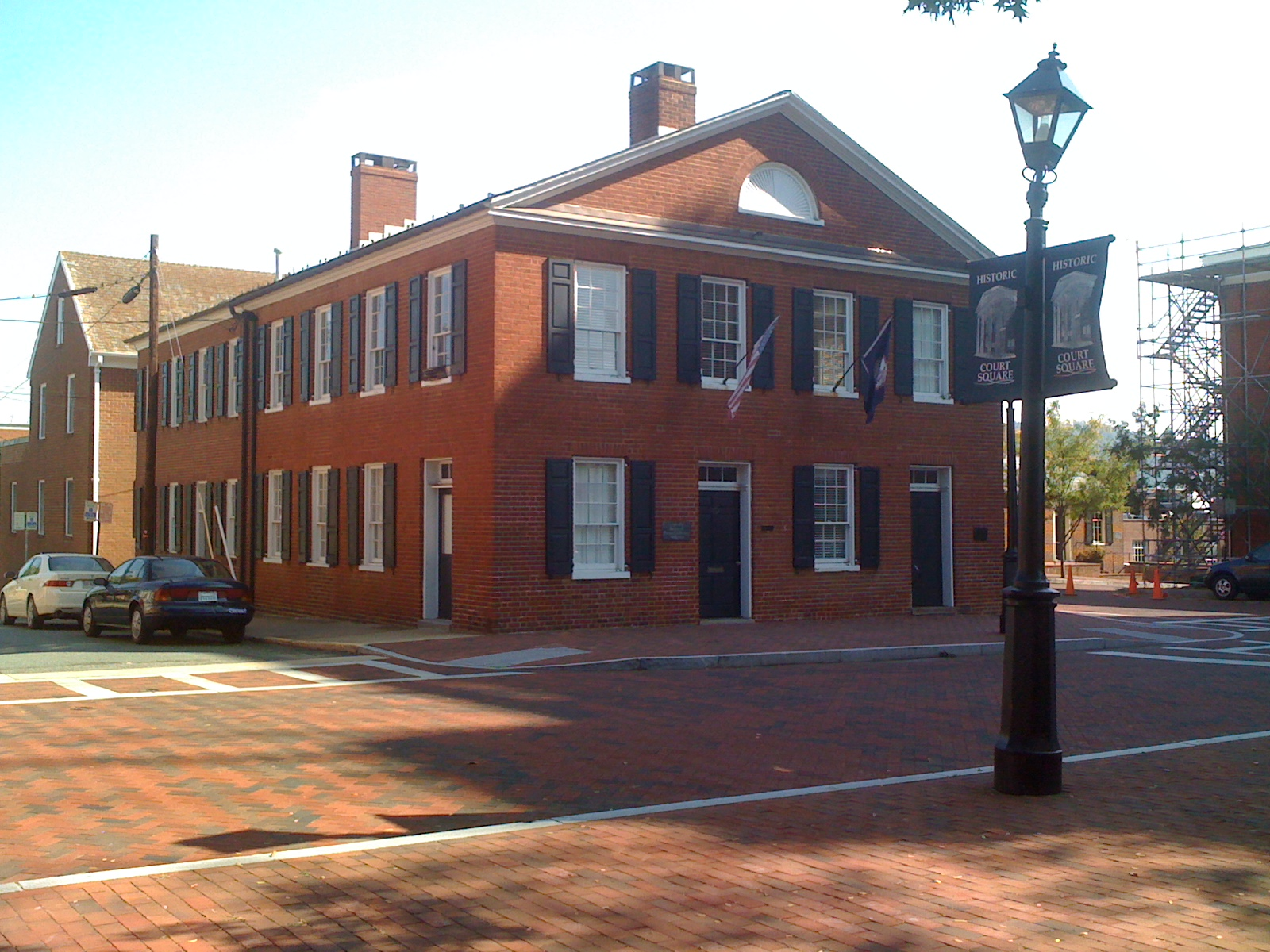

- Location within Virginia Location within the United States
- Location: Roughly bounded by Park, Water, Saxton, and Main Sts., Charlottesville, Virginia
- Coordinates: 38°2′00″N 78°28′44″W
- Area: 112 acres (45 ha)
- Architectural style: Colonial Revival, Classical Revival, Greek Revival
- NRHP reference No.: 82004904
- VLR No.: 104-0072

Significant dates
- Added to NRHP: July 28, 1982
- Designated VLR: November 18, 1980, December 6, 1995

Charlottesville and Albemarle County Courthouse Historic District, also known as the Charlottesville Historic District, is a national historic district located at Charlottesville, Virginia. The district encompasses the previously listed Albemarle County Courthouse Historic District and includes 269 contributing buildings and 1 contributing object in the city of Charlottesville. It includes the traditional heart of the city's commercial, civic, and religious activities, with early residential development and industrial sites located along the fringe. The commercial core is located along a seven block Downtown Mall designed by Lawrence Halprin (1916-2009). Notable buildings include the Albemarle County Courthouse (1803, 1859, 1865, and 1938), Levy Opera House (c. 1851), Number Nothing (c. 1820), Redland Club (c. 1832), Eagle Tavern, United States Post Office and Courts Building (1906), Christ (Episcopal) Church (1895-1898), Beth Israel Synagogue (1882-1903), Holy Comforter Catholic Church (1925), First Methodist Church (1924), McIntire Public Library (1919-1922), and Virginia National Bank (1916). Also located in the district are the separately listed Abell-Gleason House, William H. McGuffey Primary School, Thomas Jonathan Jackson sculpture, Robert Edward Lee sculpture, and Marshall-Rucker-Smith House.

It was listed on the National Register of Historic Places in 1982.
