= Marshall–Rucker–Smith House =

Historic house in Virginia, United States

- U.S. National Register of Historic Places
- U.S. Historic district – Contributing property
- Virginia Landmarks Register
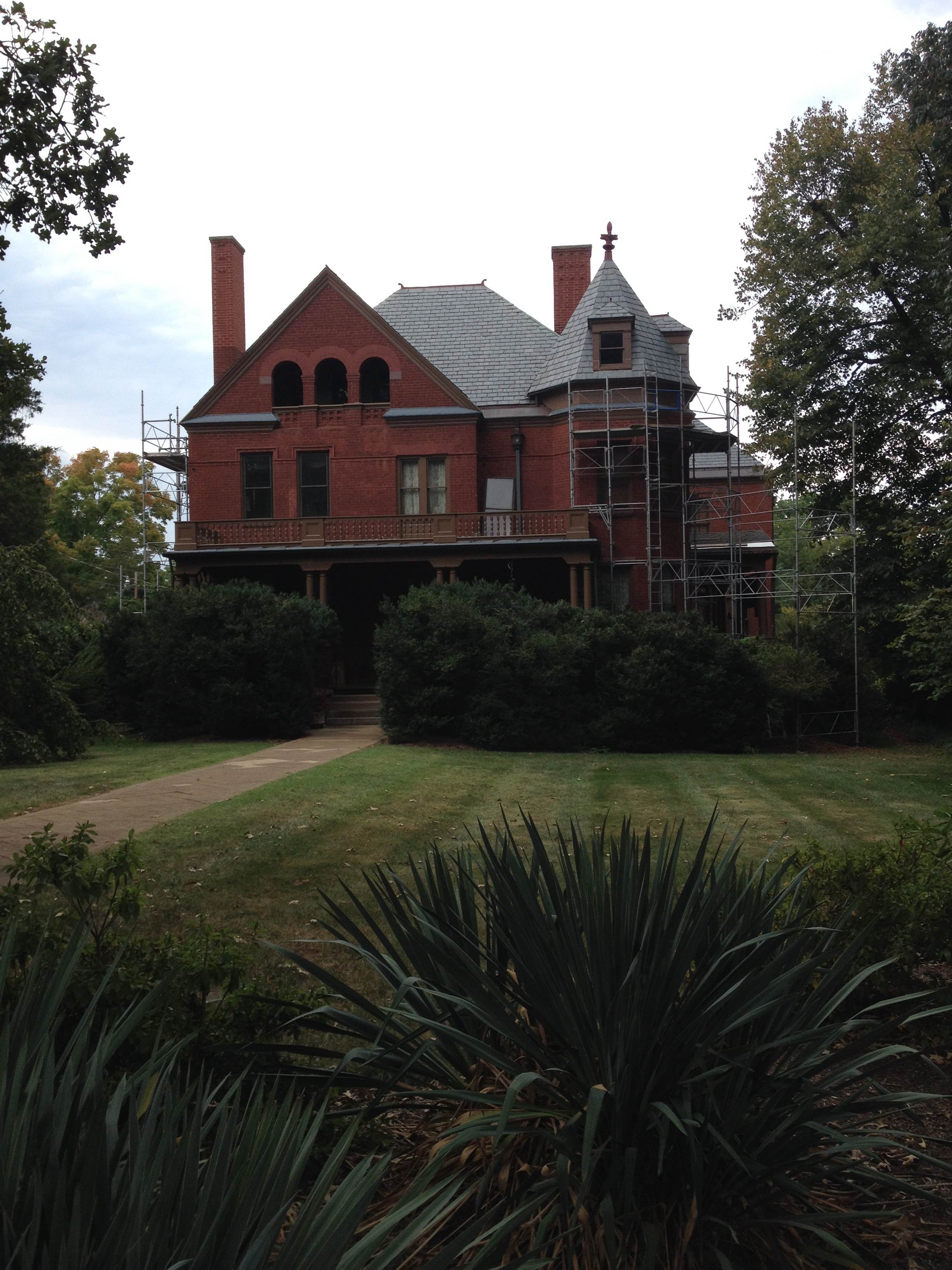

- Location within Virginia Location within the United States
- Location: 620 Park St., Charlottesville, Virginia
- Coordinates: 38°2′7″N 78°28′30″W
- Area: 0.8 acres (0.32 ha)
- Built: 1894
- Built by: Vandegrift, William T.
- Architectural style: Queen Anne
- NRHP reference No.: 99000725
- VLR No.: 104-5073

Significant dates
- Added to NRHP: June 25, 1999
- Designated VLR: March 17, 1999

The Marshall–Rucker–Smith House is a historic home located at Charlottesville, Virginia. It was built for J. William and Carrie Marshall in 1894 by William T. Vandegrift, the grandfather of General Alexander Archer Vandegrift, and is a two-story, nearly square, Queen Anne style brick dwelling. It has a three-story octagonal corner tower, a prominent front gable projection of the slate-shingled hip roof, a two-story rear wing, and multiple one-story porches. A two-story solarium and library wing were added by its second owner, William J. Rucker in about 1930. Also on the property is a contributing swimming pool (c. 1930) which is now used as a members-only neighborhood pool. In the mid-20th century, after the house had been made into a rooming house, future Supreme Court Justice Sandra Day O'Connor numbered among its residents while her husband was attending the Judge Advocate General School at the University of Virginia School of Law.

It was listed on the National Register of Historic Places in 1999. It is located in the Charlottesville and Albemarle County Courthouse Historic District.
