= William H. McGuffey House =

Historic house in Ohio, United States

- U.S. National Register of Historic Places
- U.S. National Historic Landmark
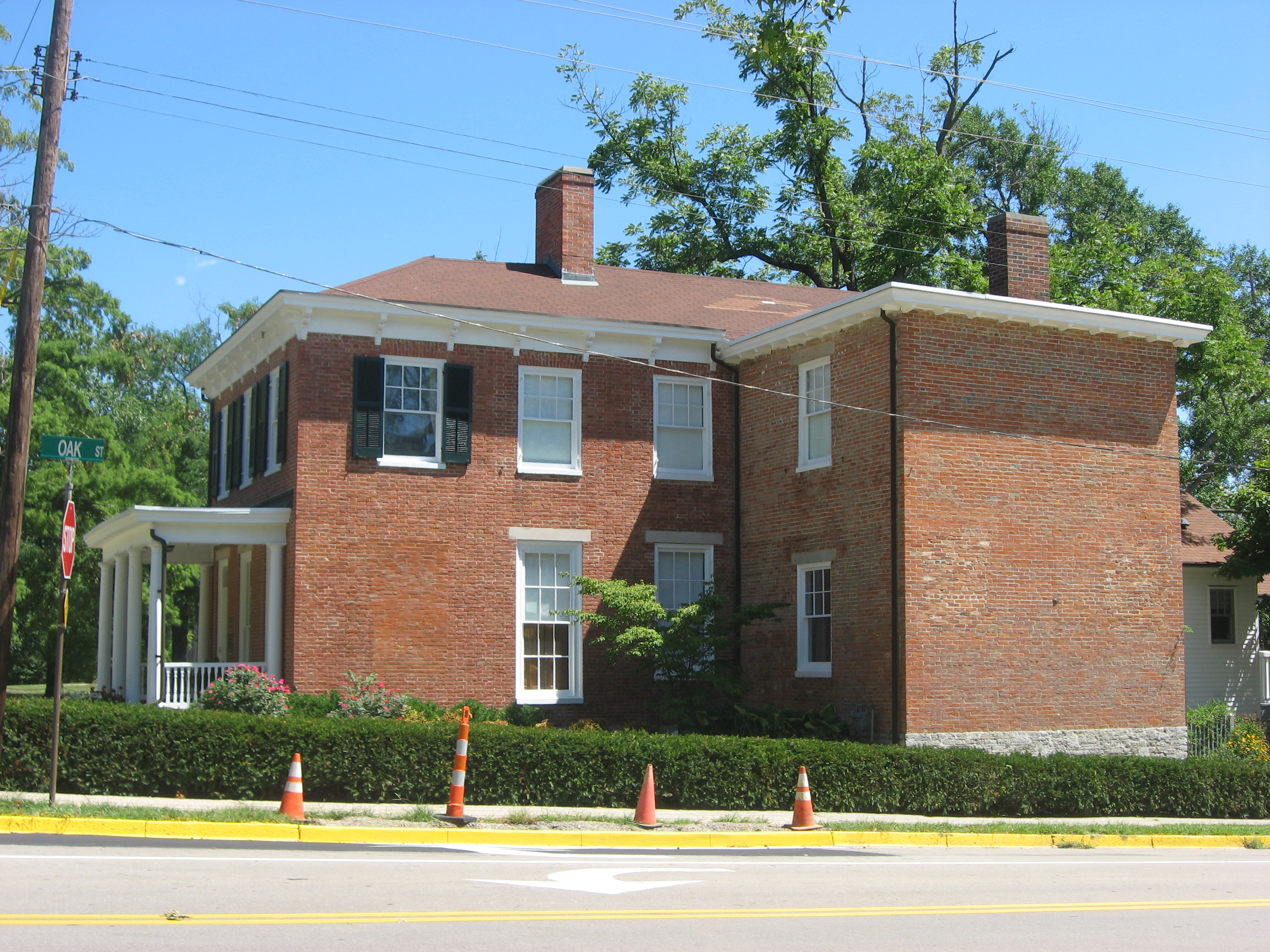
- Front and western side of the house

- Location within Ohio Location within the United States
- Location: 401 E. Spring St., Oxford, Ohio
- Coordinates: 39°30′25″N 84°44′10″W
- Area: less than one acre
- Built: 1833
- Architect: William H. McGuffey
- NRHP reference No.: 66000605

Significant dates
- Added to NRHP: October 15, 1966
- Designated NHL: December 21, 1965

The William H. McGuffey House is a historic house museum at 401 East Spring Street, on the campus of Miami University in Oxford, Ohio, United States. Built in 1833, it was the home of author and professor William Holmes McGuffey (1800–1873) from then until 1836. It is believed to be the site where he wrote the first four of the McGuffey Readers, widely popular instructional texts used to educate generations of Americans. The house was designated a National Historic Landmark in 1965. It is now operated by Miami University as the William Holmes McGuffey Museum.

== Description and history ==
The William H. McGuffey House is located southeast of uptown Oxford, at the southeast corner of East Spring and South Oak Streets. It is a two-story brick structure with a gabled roof, and a two-story wood-frame ell extending behind it. The main roof line has a bracketed cornice in the front, and the side gables are adorned with Gothic style drip moulding. A single-story porch extends across the front, with a flat roof supported by four Tuscan columns, and a spindled balustrade. The main facade is three bays wide, with the main entrance in the left bay, topped by a transom window. The interior has a restored 19th-century appearance, and includes artifacts generally of that period, as well as items specific to the ownership of William H. McGuffey.

The house was built in 1833 for William H. McGuffey, then a professor at Miami University. McGuffey had an abiding interest in public education, and it is here that he began to produce and publish the McGuffey Readers, a series of graded instructional texts. These were hugely popular, selling millions of copies nationwide, and were used by schools as instructional texts into the 20th century. McGuffey only lived here until 1836, when he moved to Athens. The house then went through a succession of owners, before it was acquired by the university and restored as a historic house museum.

== See also ==
- William H. McGuffey Boyhood Home Site
- List of National Historic Landmarks in Ohio
