= James Morrison (Indiana politician) =

American politician

3rd Secretary of State of Indiana
- In office January 14, 1829 – January 14, 1833
- Governor: James B. Ray, Noah Noble
- Preceded by: William W. Wick
- Succeeded by: William Sheets

1st Indiana Attorney General
- In office March 5, 1855 – December 17, 1856
- Governor: Joseph A. Wright
- Succeeded by: Joseph E. McDonald

Personal details
- Born: Ayrshire, Scotland
- Party: Republican

James Morrison (1796 - March 20, 1869) was an American politician, lawyer, and judge who served as the third Secretary of State of Indiana (1829–1833) and as the first Indiana Attorney General (1855–1856).

== Biography ==
Morrison was born in 1796 in Ayrshire, Scotland, Great Britain. He had two brothers, William H. and Alexander F. Morrison.

At a young age, Morrison traveled with his parents to the United States, settling in Bath, New York. There, he received a short elementary school education and read law with a local judge, William B. Rochester.

After being admitted to the bar, Morrison moved to Indiana with his brothers, settling in Charlestown, Clark County. Morrison practiced law there for a decade with Charles Dewey, who later became a Justice of the Indiana Supreme Court.

In 1828, Morrison was elected Secretary of State of Indiana, succeeding William W. Wick. Upon his election, Morrison and his brothers moved permanently from Charlestown to Indianapolis. Morrison held the position of Secretary of State for exactly four years, serving under Governors James B. Ray (an independent) and Noah Noble (a Whig). Morrison was succeeded to the position by William Sheets.

After his time as Secretary of State, Morrison served as President Judge of the Fifth Circuit Court (comprising the counties of Marion, Hancock, Shelby, Bartholomew, Johnson, Morgan, Hendricks, Boone, Hamilton, and Madison). Morrison was appointed to the position by Governor David Wallace. He served on the bench from August 2, 1839, to August 15, 1842.

Morrison also served for ten years as the second President of the Bank of Indiana, succeeding Samuel Merrill after Merrill resigned to become President of the Jeffersonville, Madison and Indianapolis Railroad.

In 1855, Governor Joseph A. Wright appointed Morrison (who at this point had become a Republican) as the first Attorney General of Indiana. Morrison would serve as Attorney General for only a short time, however, leaving the position in December 1856, around the same time Wright's final term as Governor was ending.

Morrison was senior warden of Christ Church and later St. Paul's Church in Indianapolis. He also served as the first President of a Burns Club in Indianapolis.

Morrison died in 1869.

Political offices
Preceded by William W. Wick	Secretary of State of Indiana; 1829-1833	Succeeded by William Sheets
Preceded by Office established	Indiana Attorney General; 1855–1856	Succeeded by Joseph E. McDonald
