= Albemarle County Courthouse Historic District =

Historic district in Virginia, US

- U.S. National Register of Historic Places
- U.S. Historic district
- Virginia Landmarks Register
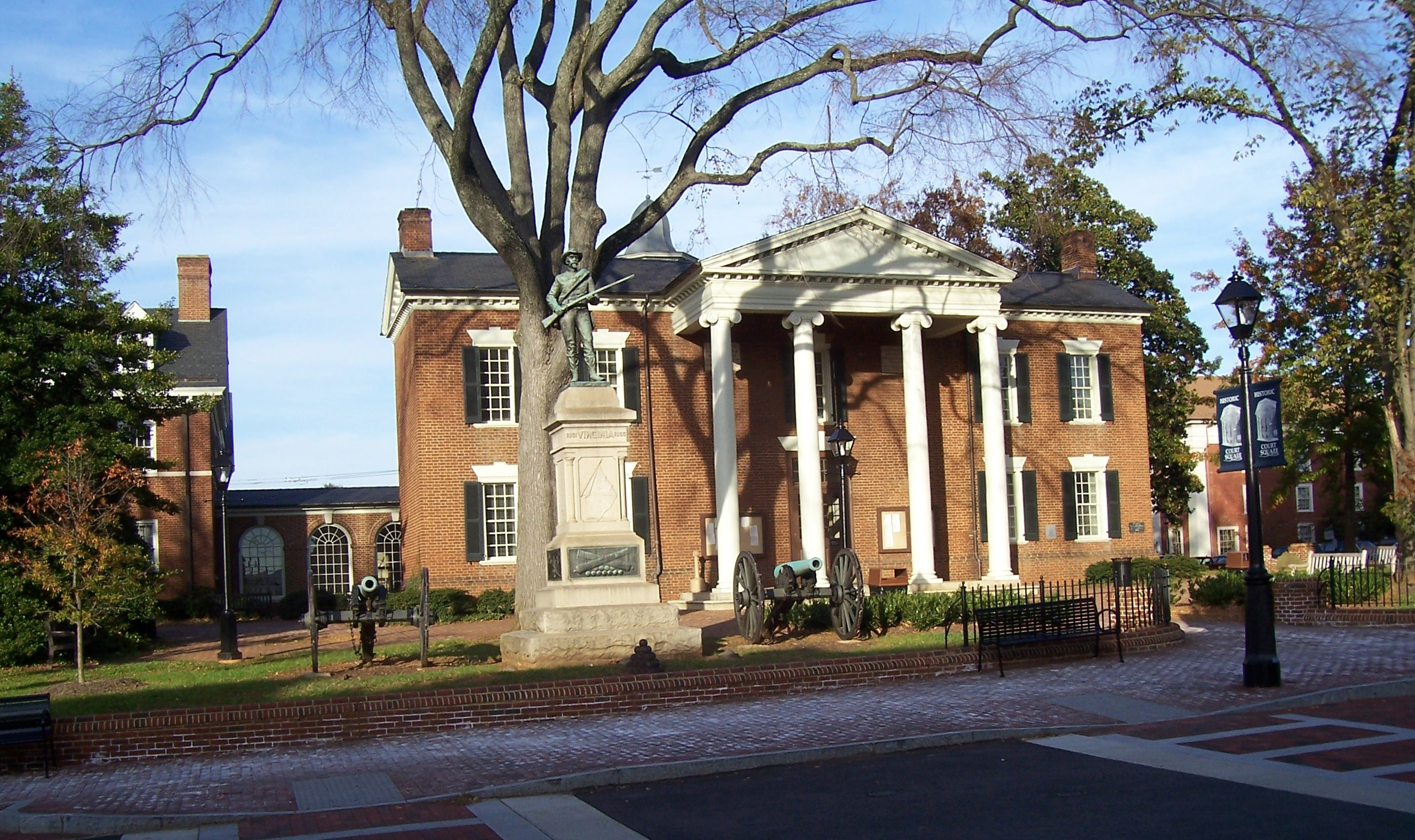
- Albemarle County Courthouse and Confederate monument, 2010

- Location within Virginia Location within the United States
- Location: Courthouse Sq. and surrounding properties, Charlottesville, Virginia
- Coordinates: 38°1′55″N 78°28′38″W
- Area: 9.9 acres (4.0 ha)
- Architectural style: Colonial Revival, Greek Revival, Federal
- NRHP reference No.: 72001503
- VLR No.: 104-0057

Significant dates
- Added to NRHP: June 30, 1972
- Designated VLR: January 18, 1972

Albemarle County Courthouse Historic District is a historic courthouse and national historic district located at Charlottesville, Virginia. The district encompasses 22 contributing buildings and 1 contributing object (the Thomas Jonathan Jackson sculpture) centered on Court Square. The original section of the courthouse was built in 1803 in the Federal style and is now the north wing. The courthouse is a two-story, five-bay, T-shaped brick building with a Greek Revival style portico. Other notable buildings include the Levy Opera House (c. 1851), Number Nothing (c. 1820), Redland Club (c. 1832), and Eagle Tavern.

It was listed on the National Register of Historic Places in 1973. The district was incorporated into the Charlottesville and Albemarle County Courthouse Historic District in 1982.
