= William W. Wick =

American politician

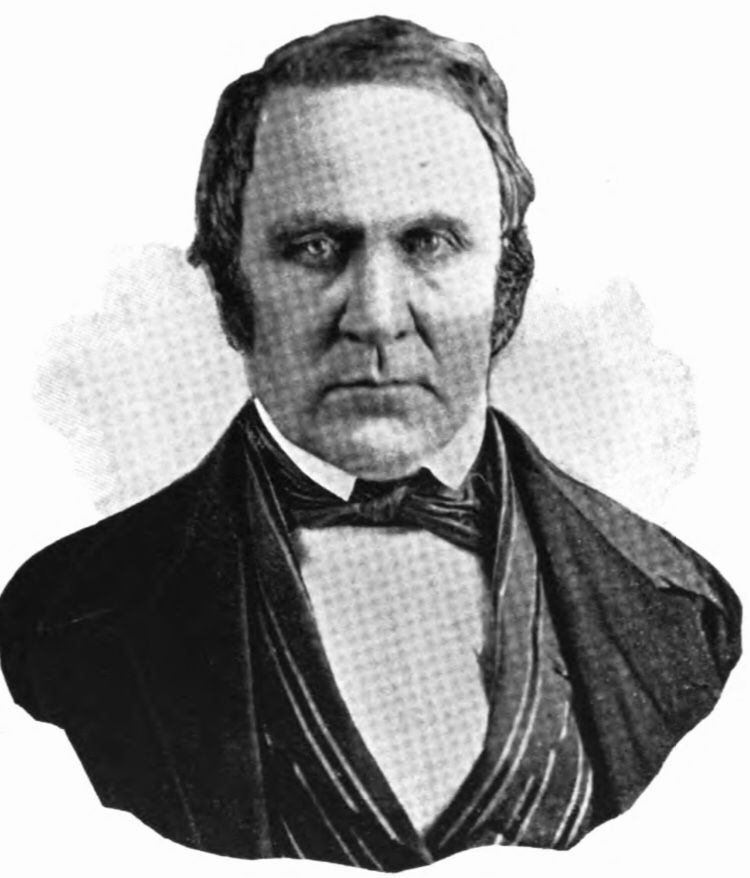

2nd Secretary of State of Indiana
- In office January 14, 1825 – January 14, 1829
- Governor: William Hendricks; James B. Ray
- Preceded by: Robert A. New
- Succeeded by: James Morrison

Member of the U.S. House of Representatives from Indiana's 6th district
- In office March 4, 1839 – March 4, 1841
- Preceded by: William Herod
- Succeeded by: David Wallace

Member of the U.S. House of Representatives from Indiana's 5th district
- In office March 4, 1845 – March 4, 1849
- Preceded by: William J. Brown
- Succeeded by: William J. Brown

Personal details
- Born: William Watson Wick; February 23, 1796 Canonsburg, Pennsylvania, United States
- Died: May 19, 1868 (aged 72) Franklin, Indiana, U.S.
- Resting place: Greenlawn Cemetery, Franklin, Indiana, United States
- Party: Democratic
- Parents: William Wick (father); Elizabeth McFarland Wick (mother)

William Watson Wick (February 23, 1796 – May 19, 1868) was a U.S. representative from Indiana and the 2nd secretary of state of Indiana. He was a lawyer and over his career he was a judge for 15 years. President Franklin Pierce appointed him postmaster of Indianapolis, Indiana.

Wick proposed an amendment to extend the Missouri Compromise line west to the Pacific coast with the Wilmot Proviso (1846). The provision that would make slave states of the American southwest was passed in the House, but defeated in the Senate. Wick supported the colonization of blacks to Liberia. He campaigned for Stephen A. Douglas in 1860.

== Early life and education ==
William Watson Wick was born on February 23, 1796, in Canonsburg, Washington County, Pennsylvania. He was the son of a Presbyterian minister, Rev. William Walter Wick and his wife, Elizabeth (née McFarland). (Note: Most mentions of Wick's parents describe a high level biography (father a Presbyterian minister who was an early settler in Connecticut Western Reserve from Washington County, Pennsylvania, etc), but not their names. Woollen states that William's father is Rev. William Wick, and Butler states that Rev. William Wick was married to Elizabeth McFarland.)

In 1800, his parents moved the family to the Connecticut Western Reserve for the purpose of missionary work in the region; his father became the first minister to settle in the Western Reserve.

William completed preparatory studies, and after his father's death in 1815, he moved to Cincinnati, Ohio, where he taught school and studied medicine until 1818. He then studied law and was admitted to the bar at Franklin, Indiana, in 1819.

== Career ==
After practicing law in Connersville, Indiana, Wick served as Clerk of the Indiana House of Representatives in 1820 and Assistant Clerk for the Indiana Senate in 1821. Appointed to a state judgeship, he served as President Judge of the Fifth Judicial Circuit from 1822 to 1825, presiding over the first court in Morgan County, Indiana. He moved to Indianapolis in 1822. He was the Quartermaster General in 1826.

He was then Indiana's Secretary of State until 1829. He returned to the Fifth Judicial Circuit, first as a Prosecutor until 1831, and, from 1834 to 1837, he was again a President Judge. He presided over the trial about the Fall Creek massacre, which resulted in the first recorded case of a white man being sentenced to death for crimes against Native Americans under U.S. law.

In 1838, Wick was elected to the Twenty-sixth Congress as a Democrat, and began his first term on March 4, 1839. Having failed in his bid for reelection, he resumed his private law practice in Indianapolis.

He was elected to the Twenty-ninth and Thirtieth Congress, and served from March 4, 1845, to March 3, 1849. In 1846, during the debates about the Wilmot Proviso, he proposed an amendment to extend the Missouri Compromise line to the Pacific coast. Wick feared that free blacks would "flood" the urban northeast. The proposal was defeated 89–54. The Wilmot Proviso passed the House and was defeated in the Senate.

Wick was a leading opponent of racial mixing and integration, and famous for his opposition to the annexation of Mexican territory. He stated: "I do not want any mixed races in our Union, nor men of any color except white, unless they be slaves. Certainly not as voters or legislators." He served as Secretary of the Indiana Colonization Society (affiliated with the American Colonization Society), which helped to establish Liberia as a homeland for free blacks.

He sat as a judge of the Circuit Court for a third time from 1850 to 1853. In 1853, President Franklin Pierce appointed him Postmaster of Indianapolis, in which capacity he served until April 6, 1857. Later he served as Adjutant General in the State Militia. He moved to Franklin, Indiana, in 1857, where he continued his law practice. He sat as a judge of the Circuit Court for a fourth time until the Autumn of 1859, for a total of 15 years on the bench. In 1860, he supported Stephen A. Douglas's campaign for president by giving speeches throughout Indiana.

== Personal life ==
Wick was married on August 20, 1820, to Laura (or Lora) Finch, the sister of the esteemed lawyer Fabius M, Finch, in Fayette County, Indiana. (Note: His wife is also stated to have been Alice Finch, the daughter of Judge J. Finch. The marriage records state that his wife was Lora Finch.) They had two sons and a daughter. His wife died in 1832. He married Isabella Graham Barbee on November 7, 1839, in Washington, Indiana. Isabella was the daughter of Alice Bickerton Winston and Thomas Barbee. The Wicks had a daughter, Alice Barbee Wick.

Around 1860, Wick moved to Franklin, Indiana, to live with his daughter, Laura W. Overstreet (Mrs. William H. Overstreet), who was born about 1824. The Overstreets had four children by 1850 and the same year 20-year-old Cyrus Wick lived with them. He died at his daughter's house in Franklin on May 19, 1868. He was interred in Greenlawn Cemetery. He was described as "warm-hearted, humorous and improvident… and he took no thought for the morrow." Isabella, his second wife, lived until 1875.

== Notes ==
Political offices
Preceded by Robert A. New	Secretary of State of Indiana; 1825–1829	Succeeded by James Morrison
U.S. House of Representatives
Preceded by William Herod	Member of the U.S. House of Representatives from Indiana's 6th congressional district 1839–1841	Succeeded by David Wallace
Preceded by William J. Brown	Member of the U.S. House of Representatives from Indiana's 5th congressional district 1845–1849	Succeeded by William J. Brown
