= William Holmes McGuffey =

Early influential American educator

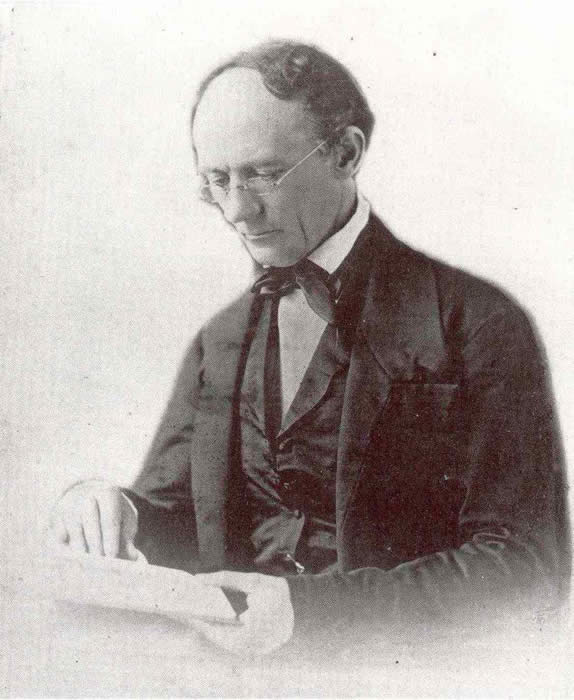
- Born: September 23, 1800; Claysville, Pennsylvania, U.S.
- Died: May 4, 1873 (aged 72); Charlottesville, Virginia, U.S.
- Occupations: Educator, Academic Author
- Known for: McGuffey Readers

William Holmes McGuffey (September 23, 1800 – May 4, 1873) was an American college professor and president who is best known for writing the McGuffey Readers, the first widely used series of elementary school-level textbooks. More than 120 million copies of McGuffey Readers were sold between 1836 and 1960, placing its sales in a category with the Bible and Webster's Dictionary.

== Early years ==
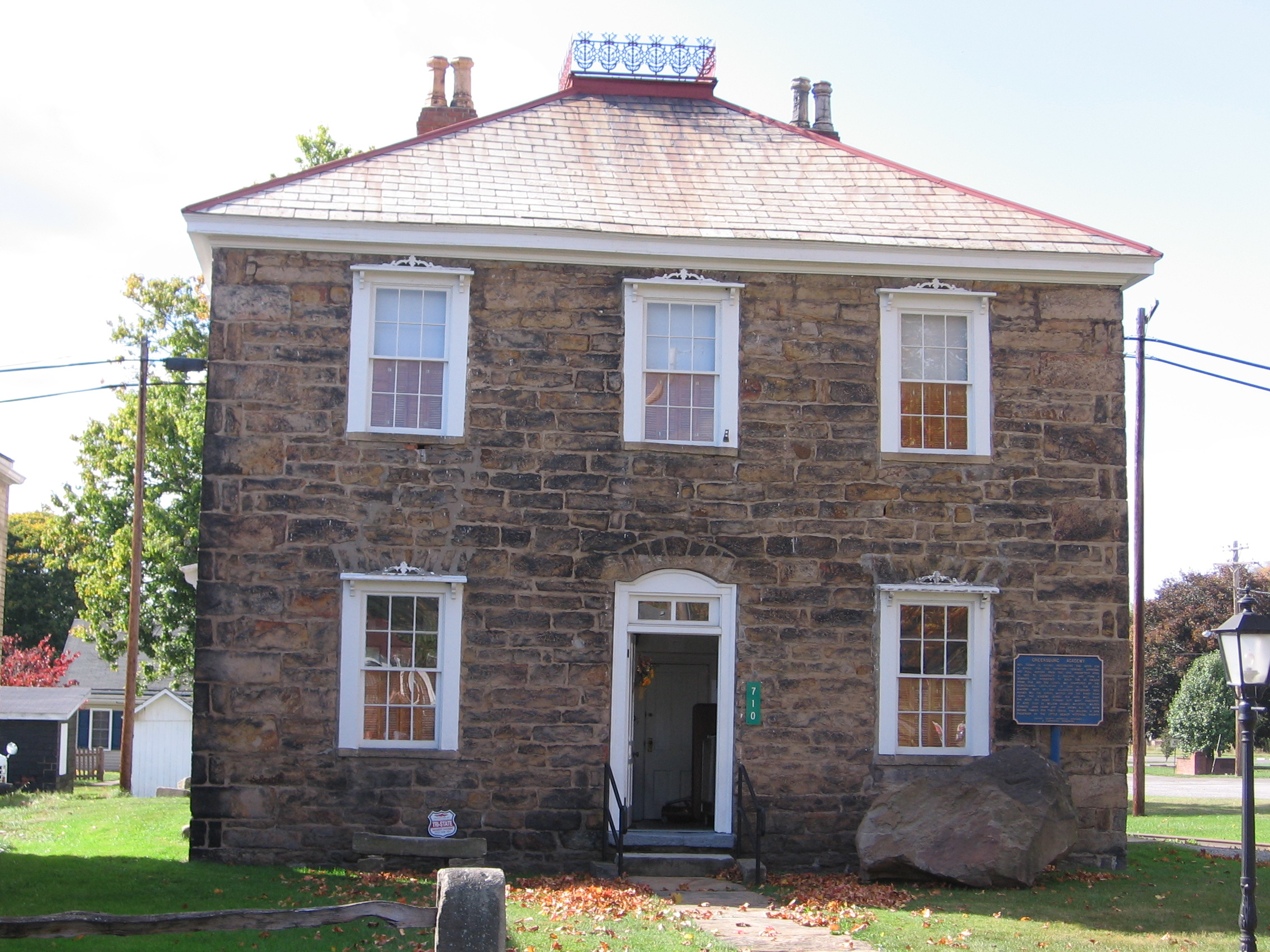
Greersburg Academy, a college preparation academy in Darlington, Pennsylvania.

William Holmes McGuffey, born September 23, 1800, was the son of Alexander and Anna (Holmes) McGuffey near Claysville in West Finley Township, Washington County, Pennsylvania, which is 45 miles southwest of Pittsburgh. His family, who had strong opinions about education and religion, immigrated from Scotland to the United States in 1774. In 1802, the McGuffey family moved farther out into the frontier at Tuscarawas County, Ohio. He attended country school, and after receiving special instruction at Youngstown, he attended Greersburg Academy in Darlington, Pennsylvania.

== Early career and college education ==
At the age of 14, he was a roving instructor in a one-room schoolhouse in Calcutta, Ohio. He traveled through the frontier of Ohio, Kentucky, and western Pennsylvania. He was "one of an army of half-educated young men who tramped the roads and trails drumming up 'subscription scholars'." (Note: These half-educated young men would travel to and from different settlements looking for a part-time teaching job. They would teach in log-cabins to children whose parents would pay for their education. The teachers would educate the children until the parents ran out of funding or until the parents did not care to have their children educated anymore. One of the small settlements where he taught was Poland, Ohio.) His students generally brought their Bibles, because there were few textbooks at that time. He taught children from the age of six to twenty-one. He taught in frontier schools, often eleven hours a day and six days a week.

In between jobs as a teacher, he attended and graduated in 1826 from Pennsylvania's Washington College, where he became an instructor. He was close friends with Washington College's President Andrew Wylie and lived in Wylie's house for a time; they often would walk the three miles to Washington College together.

== Career and life ==
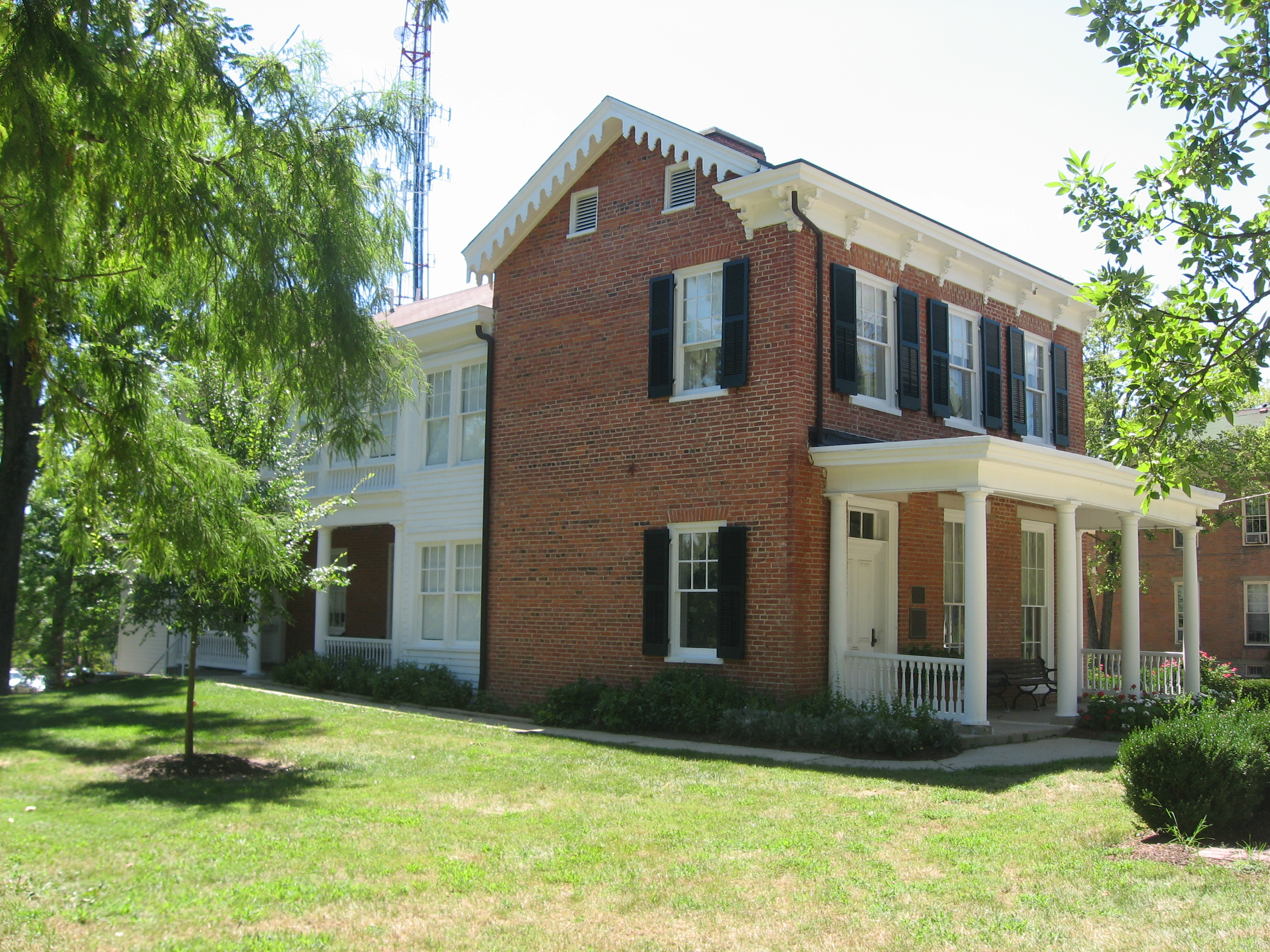
William H. McGuffey House in Oxford, Ohio. It is a museum and National Historic Landmark.

McGuffey left Washington College in 1826 to become a professor of ancient languages at Miami University in Oxford, Ohio. In 1832, he was transferred to the chair of moral philosophy.

In 1829, he was licensed as a minister in the Presbyterian Church at Bethel Chapel. He preached frequently during the remainder of his life.

Truman and Smith, a Cincinnati publisher, wanted to publish a series of four graded readers for schoolchildren. Based upon a recommendation from Harriet Beecher Stowe, they hired McGuffey. His brother Alexander Hamilton McGuffey wrote the fifth and sixth readers for the McGuffey Readers series. His books sold over 120 million copies and still continue to be used for homeschooling.

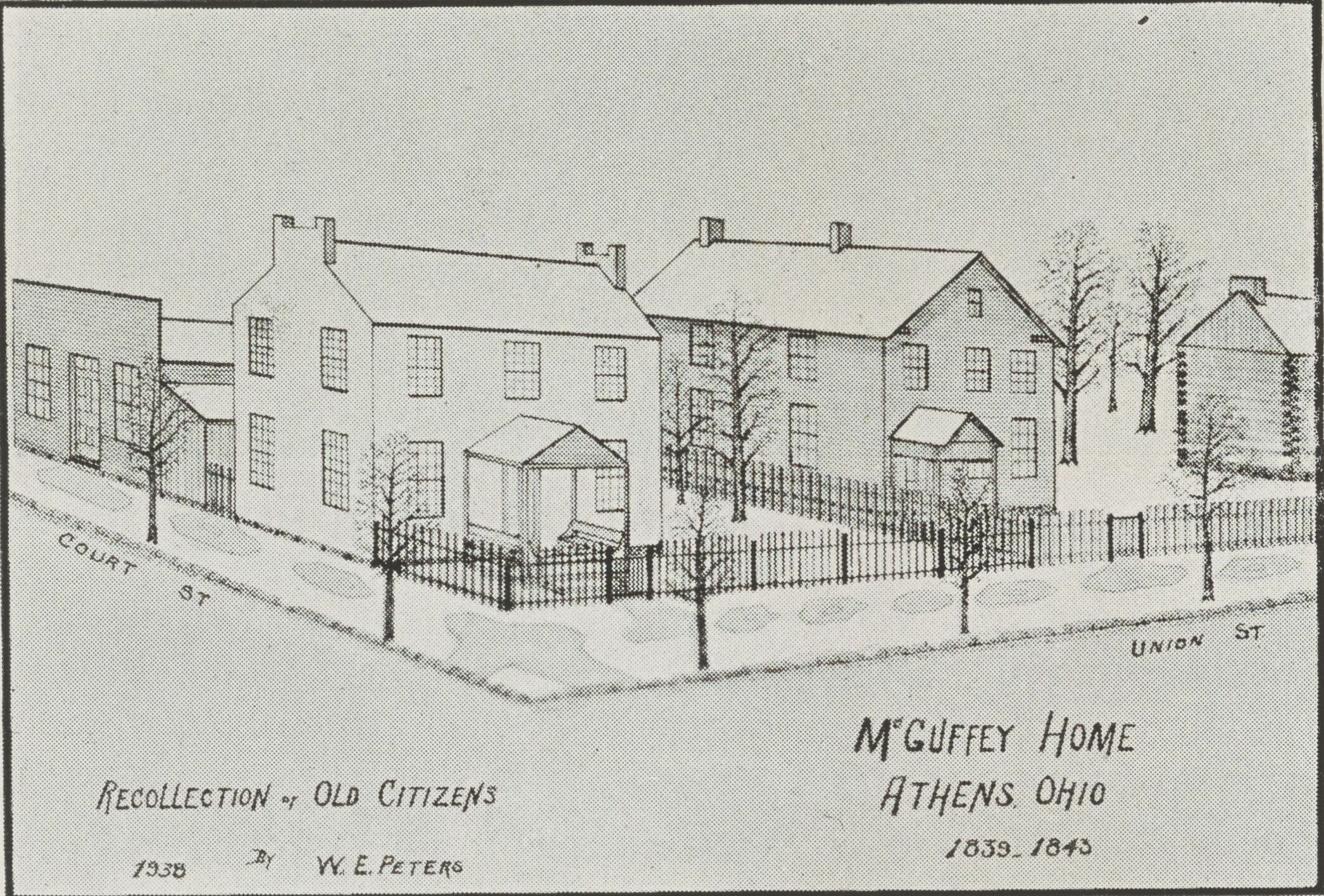
The McGuffey home while he was president of Ohio University in Athens, Ohio.

In 1836, he left Miami to become president of Cincinnati College, where he also served as a distinguished teacher and lecturer. He left Cincinnati in 1839 to become the 4th president of Ohio University, which he left in 1843 to become president of what was then called the Woodward Free Grammar School in Cincinnati, one of the country's earliest public schools.

From 1843 to 1845, he was a professor in Woodward College in Cincinnati. While in Cincinnati he began the preparation of an "Eclectic" series of readers and spellers, which became popular, and have been many times revised and reissued. From 1845 till his death, he occupied the chair of moral philosophy and political economy in the University of Virginia in Charlottesville, Virginia.

== Personal life ==
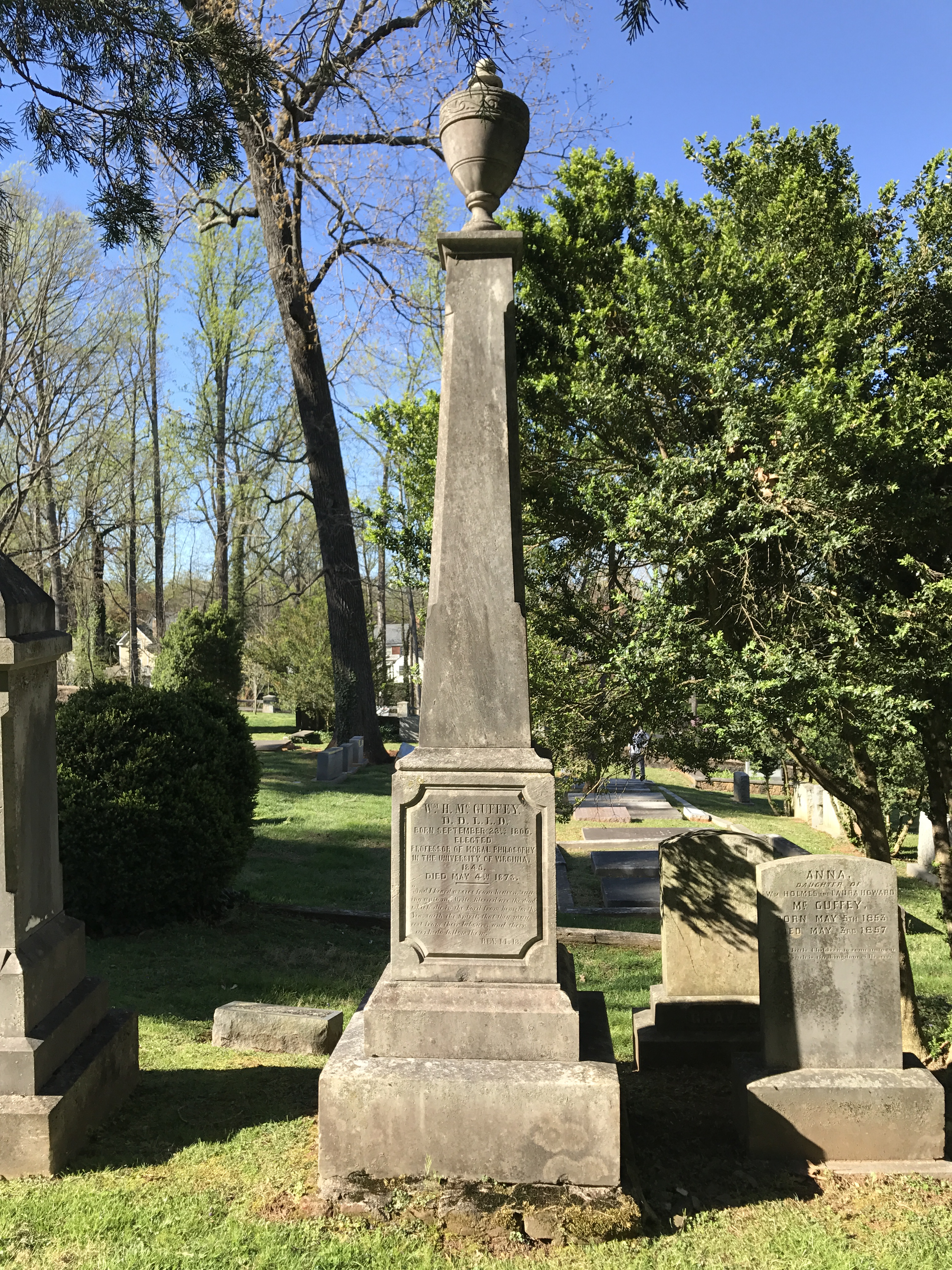
McGuffey's grave obelisk at the University of Virginia Cemetery in Charlottesville, Virginia.

He was married to Harriet Spinning of Dayton, Ohio, in 1827. They had five children, who were expected to act with submission and obedience, according to the diary of one of their daughters. McGuffey believed in the importance of education and religion to live successful lives.

McGuffey and Harriet had as many as three slaves while at Virginia. (Note: Ford notes that the McGuffeys had three slaves in 1850 and one in 1860.) One of these enslaved individuals was William Gibbons, who was hired out to them. Gibbons was literate. He was said to be self-taught and also said to have been instructed by McGuffey's daughter Maria. He later became a minister in Charlottesville and Washington, D.C. (Note: Although McGuffey was born in Pennsylvania and raised in Ohio, two free states which had abolished slavery, Virginia was at that time still a slave state. According to anthropologist Benjamin Ford in Educated in Tyranny: Slavery at Thomas Jefferson's University, McGuffey and his first wife Harriet "did not embrace slavery".)

Harriet was ill during the summer of 1850 and was taken to her parents' home in Woodside by McGuffey. Her health did not improve as hoped and she died on July 3. She was buried in Woodside Cemetery. He later married Miss Laura Howard, daughter of Dean Howard of the University of Virginia. They had one daughter, Anna. She died at the age of four.

During the American Civil War and the Reconstruction era, McGuffey was generous in his donations to the poor and African Americans. McGuffey died May 4, 1873, at the University of Virginia, and is buried in the University of Virginia Cemetery, in Charlottesville, Virginia.

== Influences ==
McGuffey was Henry Ford's favorite author and was always proud of his exposure to McGuffey's teachings, which "reinforced an ordered, rigid, and straightforward view of the world where white was white and black was black".

== Legacy ==
Named for William Holmes McGuffey's influential primers that first appeared in 1836 and remained in print until 1921, the McGuffey longevity awards recognize long-lived, still-in-use textbooks of excellence.

Places named after McGuffey:

- The William H. McGuffey Primary School in Charlottesville, VA bears his name. The historic building is currently an artist-run cooperative arts center, currently known as the McGuffey Art Center.
- Enslaved workers of University of Virginia faculty, including the McGuffey household, lived in McGuffey Cottage, which is preserved behind Pavilion IX at the University of Virginia.
- McGuffey High School and Middle School in Claysville, Pennsylvania. In 1998, the Pennsylvania Historical and Museum Commission installed a historical marker noting McGuffey's historic importance.

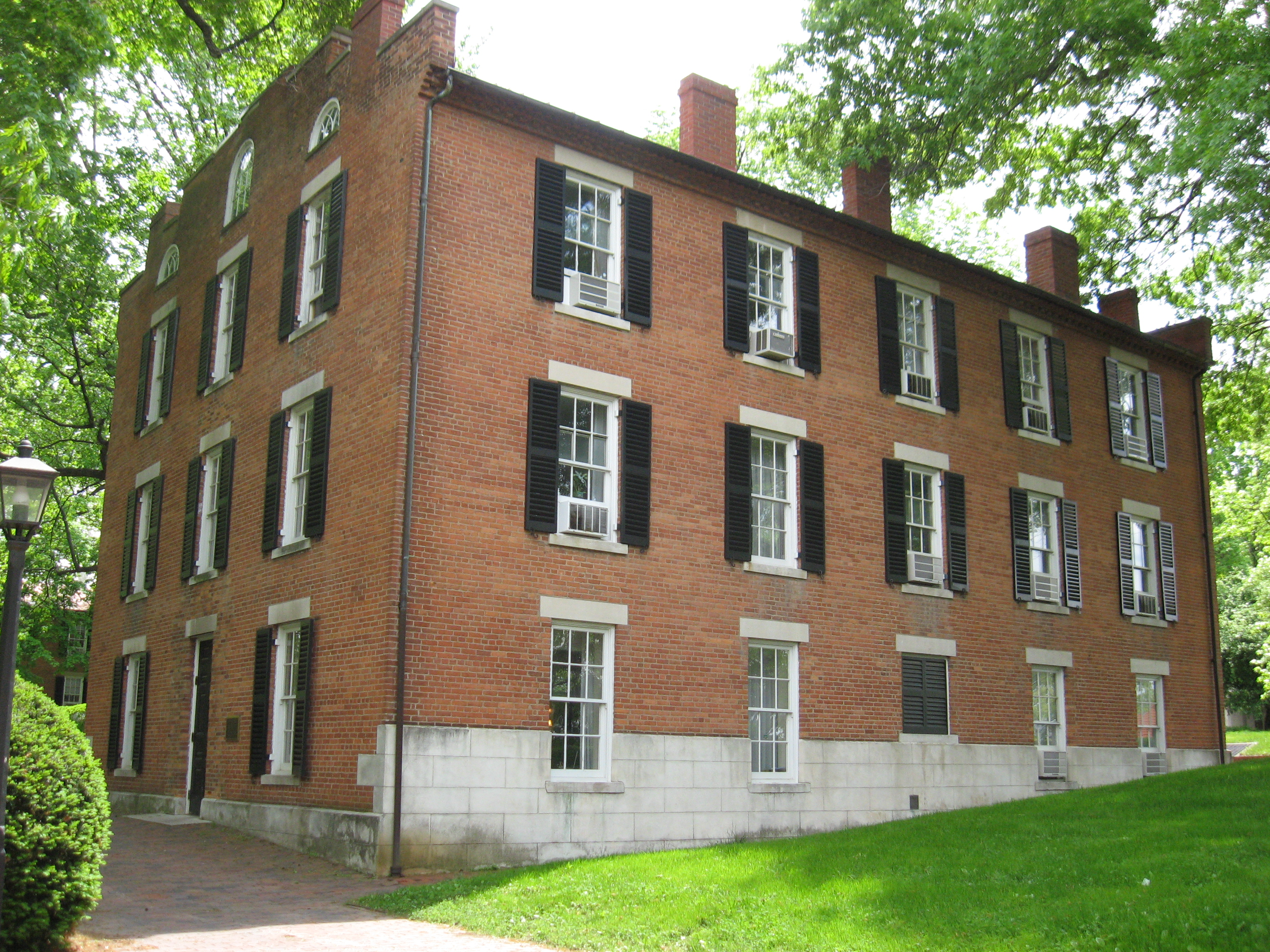
McGuffey Hall at Ohio University, named for William McGuffey

- Ohio University's Department of University Advancement is housed in a building named McGuffey Hall.
- At Miami University, McGuffey Hall is a large academic building home to several education-related departments. The university ran the McGuffey Laboratory School from 1910 until 1983 on its campus. When the school closed, some of the parents started The William Holmes McGuffey School Foundation which operates an independent progressive school in Oxford called the McGuffey Foundation School. The school was later renamed the McGuffey Montessori School.
- The McGuffey School District in Washington County, Pennsylvania is named for William Holmes McGuffey.
- The McGuffey Wildlife Preserve in Coitsville, Ohio, is named for William Holmes McGuffey

== Notes ==
Academic offices
| Preceded by Reverend Elijah Slack | President of the University of Cincinnati; 1836 – 1839 | Succeeded by Thomas J Biggs |
| Preceded by Robert G. Wilson | President of the Ohio University; 1839 – 1843 | Succeeded by Alfred Ryors |
