= McGuffey Readers =

Series of children's early reading books

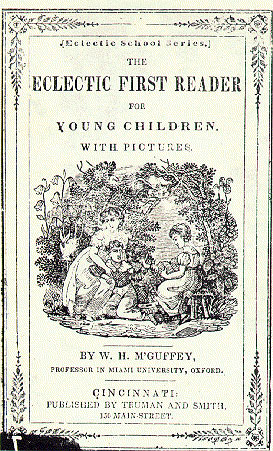
Cover of McGuffey's First Reader

The Eclectic Readers (commonly, but informally known as the McGuffey Readers) are a series of graded primers for grade levels 1–6. They were widely used as textbooks in American schools from the mid-19th century to the early 20th century, and are still used today in some private schools and homeschooling.

The editors of the Readers were brothers William Holmes McGuffey and Alexander Hamilton McGuffey. William created the first four readers and Alexander McGuffey created the fifth and sixth reader. About 120 million copies of McGuffey's Readers were sold between 1836 and 1960, placing its sales in a category with the Bible and Webster's Dictionary. Since 1961, they have continued to sell at a rate of some 30,000 copies a year. Only the Ray's Arithmetic series (1834–1913) matched it in popularity, written by a colleague of McGuffey's and begun in 1834.

== Publication ==
William Holmes McGuffey established a reputation as a lecturer on moral and biblical subjects while he was teaching at Miami University. In 1835, the small Cincinnati publishing firm of Truman and Smith asked him to create a series of four graded readers for primary level students. He had been recommended for the job by longtime friend Harriet Beecher Stowe. He completed the first two readers within a year of signing his contract, receiving a fee of $1,000 ($30,000 in 2025 dollars). He compiled the first four readers (1836–1837 edition), while the fifth and sixth were created by his brother Alexander Hamilton McGuffey during the 1840s. The series consisted of stories, poems, essays, and speeches. The advanced Readers contained excerpts from the works of well-regarded English and American writers and politicians such as Lord Byron, John Milton, and Daniel Webster.

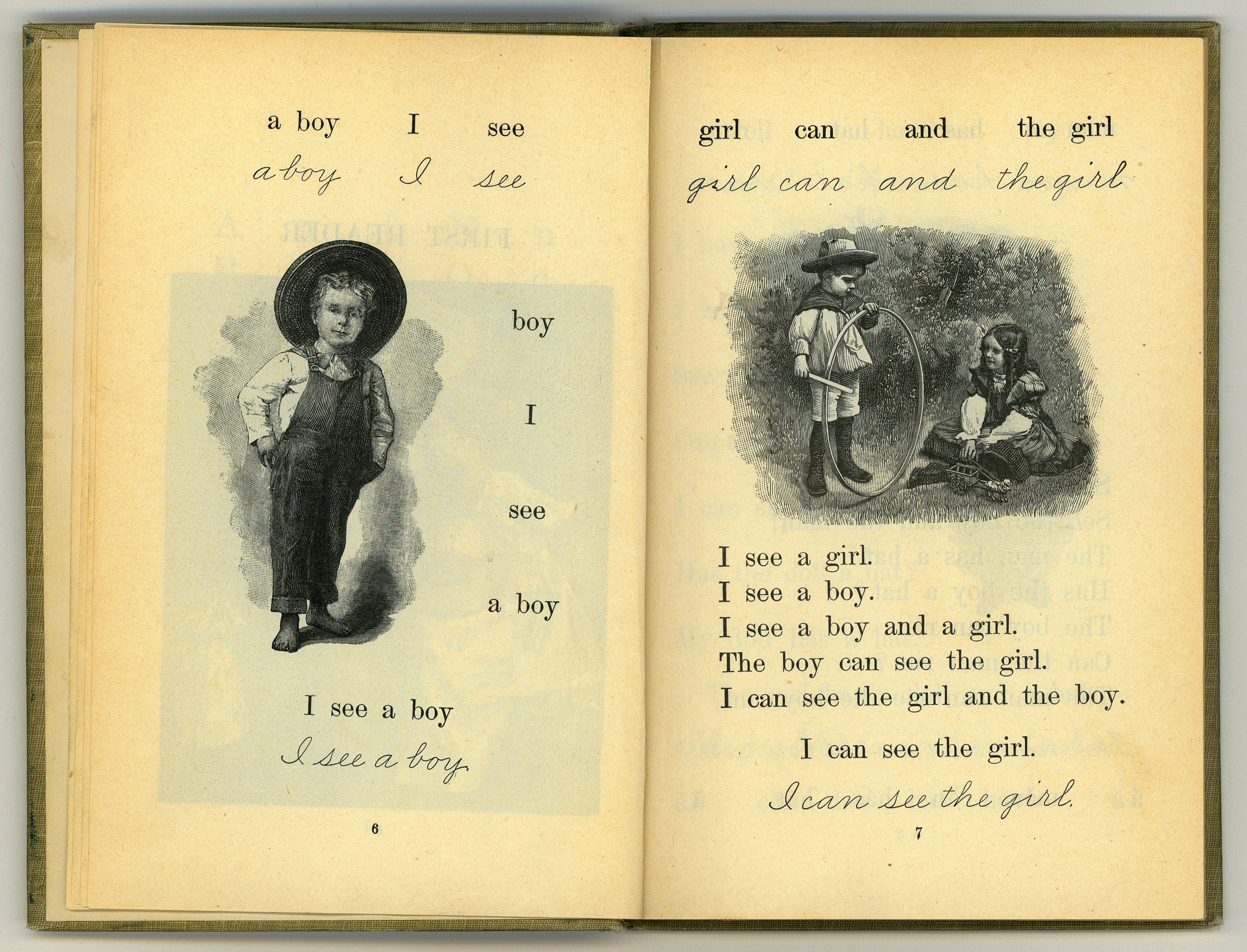
McGuffey Reader 1901

Most schools of the 19th century used only the first two in the series of McGuffey's four readers. The first Reader taught reading by using the phonics method, the identification of letters and their arrangement into words, and aided with slate work. The second Reader was used once students could read. It helped them to understand the meaning of sentences, while providing vivid stories which children could remember. The third Reader taught the definitions of words and was written at a level equivalent to the modern 5th or 6th grade. The fourth Reader was written for the highest levels of ability on the grammar school level.

McGuffey's Readers were among the first textbooks in the United States designed to be increasingly challenging with each volume. They used word repetition in the text as a learning tool, developing reading skills by challenging students using the books. Sounding-out, enunciation, and accents were emphasized. Colonial-era texts had offered dull lists of 20 to 100 new words per page for memorization. In contrast, McGuffey used new vocabulary words in the context of real literature, gradually introducing new words and carefully repeating the old.

McGuffey believed that teachers, as well as their students, should study the lessons and suggested that they read aloud to their classes. He also listed questions after each story, for he believed that asking questions was critical for a teacher to give instruction. The Readers emphasized spelling, vocabulary, and formal public speaking, which was a more common requirement in 19th-century America than today.

McGuffey is remembered as a conservative theological teacher. He interpreted the goals of public schooling in terms of moral and spiritual education, and attempted to give schools a curriculum that would instill Presbyterian Calvinist beliefs and manners in their students. These goals were considered suitable for the relatively homogeneous America of the early- to mid-19th century, though they were less so for the increasingly pluralistic society that developed in the late 19th century and early 20th century.

The content of the readers changed drastically between McGuffey's 1836–1837 edition and the 1879 edition. The revised Readers were compiled to meet the needs of national unity and the dream of an American melting pot for the world's masses. The Calvinist values of salvation, righteousness, and piety were excluded from the later versions, though they had been prominent in the early Readers. The content of the books was secularized and replaced by middle-class civil religion, morality, and values. McGuffey's name was featured on these revised editions, yet he neither contributed to them nor approved their content.

Other types of schoolbooks gradually replaced McGuffey's in the academic marketplace. The desire for distinct grade levels and less overtly religious content, and the greater profitability of consumable workbooks all helped to bring about their decline. McGuffey's Readers never entirely disappeared, however. Reprinted versions of his Readers are still in print, and may be purchased in bookstores across the country. Today, McGuffey's Readers are popular among homeschoolers and in some Protestant religious schools.

== Influence ==
Pulitzer Prize-winning writer Ron Powers notes that the Readers affected the first mass-educated and mass-literate generation in the modern world. The books made Shakespeare's plays widely known in America. Author Hamlin Garland said "I got my first taste of Shakespeare from the selected scenes which I read in these books." Students were encouraged to memorize, and read aloud, classic orations such as Antony's Oration over Dead Caesar's Body and Henry V. to His Troops. Shakespeare's tragedies were represented by The Hamlet Soliloquy. The McGuffey canon contributed to an American belief in Shakespeare's authority as second only to the Bible.

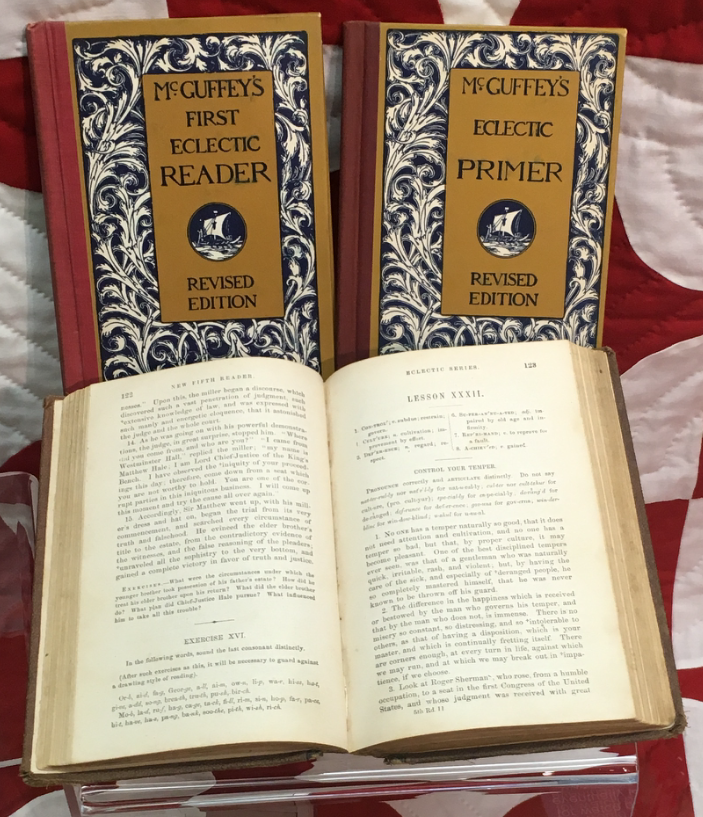
Henry Ford's childhood set of McGuffey's Readers

Industrialist Henry Ford cited McGuffey's Readers as one of his most important childhood influences. Otherwise Ford was poorly educated and read little. He was an avid fan of McGuffey's Readers first editions. Ford republished all six Readers from the 1867 edition and donated complete sets of them to schools across the United States. In 1934, Ford had the log cabin where McGuffey was born moved to Greenfield Village, Ford's museum of Americana at Dearborn, Michigan. In 1936, Ford sponsored a collection of excerpts from McGuffey Readers.

American composer Burrill Phillips composed a work entitled Selections from McGuffey's Reader, for orchestra, based on poems by Henry Wadsworth Longfellow and Oliver Wendell Holmes Sr. It was completed in 1933.

In the late 20th century many evangelical homeschooling parents used the McGuffey Readers to recapture 19th century conservative values for their children.

== See also ==
- Basal reader
- Primer (textbook)
- Dick and Jane
- Why Johnny Can't Read

== Bibliography ==
- Best, John Hardin (2000). "McGuffey, William Holmes". American National Biography Online.
- Corinth, Jacqueline. "'McGuffey's Eclectic Readers' and their Continuing Influence on American Education: A Historical Analysis of the Secondary Literature." International Journal of the Book 6.1 (2009).
- Kammen, Carol. "The McGuffey Readers." Children's Literature 5.1 (1976): 58–63 online.
- Lindberg, Stanley W. "Institutionalizing a Myth: The McGuffey Readers and the Self‐Made Man." Journal of American Culture 2.1 (1979): 71–82. excerpt
- Mosier, Richard D. (1947). Making the American Mind: Social and Moral Ideas in the McGuffey Readers. online reviewonline
- Neem, Johann N. "The strange afterlife of William McGuffey and his readers." The Hedgehog Review 20.2 (2018): 114–123. online
- Saunders, Dero A. "Social ideas in McGuffey readers." Public Opinion Quarterly 5.4 (1941): 579–589 online.
- Sullivan, Dolores P. William Holmes McGuffey: Schoolmaster to the Nation (Fairleigh Dickinson University Press, 1994).
- Vail, Henry Hobart. A history of the McGuffey Readers (Burrows Brothers, 1911) online.
- Westerhoff III, John H. (1978). McGuffey and His Readers: Piety, Morality, and Education in Nineteenth-Century America.
