= List of Miami University people =

This is a list of Miami University people who have some significant affiliation with the school, including university presidents, notable alumni, and faculty members.

== Alumni ==
=== Academia ===
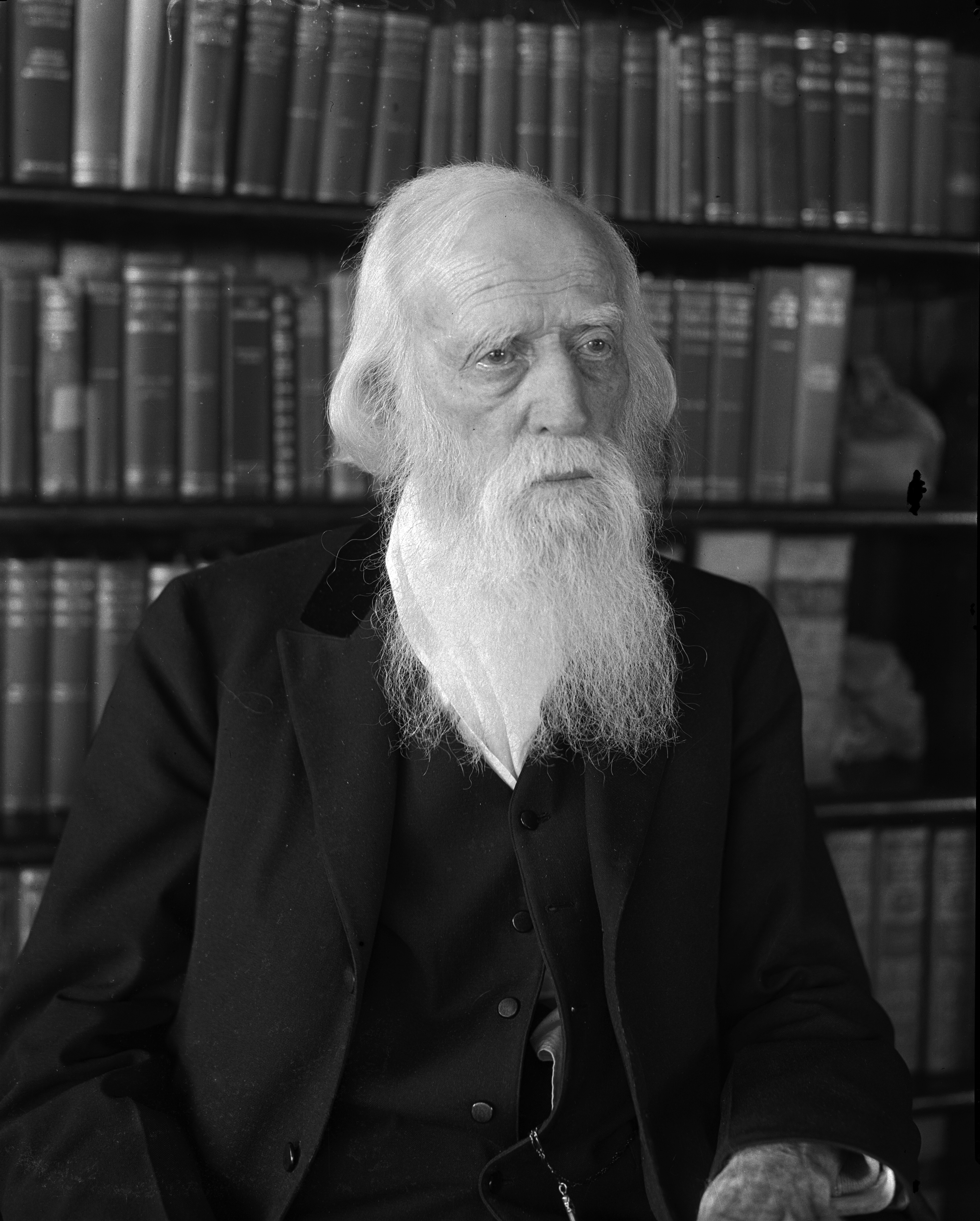
Joseph Widney, second president of the University of Southern California, director of the United States Public Health Service, and director of the New York Public Library

- Carol Anderson, professor of African American Studies at Emory University
- John Alexander Anderson, former congressman from Kansas; consul to Egypt; second president of Kansas State University
- C. Michael Armstrong, chairman, board of trustees Johns Hopkins Medicine, Health System Corp. and Hospital, Baltimore, Maryland
- Joseph M. Bachelor, poet, professor
- Donald Barr, professor of Human Ecology at Cornell University and leader of movement to disinvest in South Africa
- Jeffrey Brown, dean, College of Business, University of Illinois
- David A. Caputo, president of Pace University
- Ronald Crutcher, president of University of Richmond; formerly, president of Wheaton College
- Katharine Jane Densford, director of the University of Minnesota School of Nursing, provided important nursing leadership during World War II
- David Dickey, statistician
- Alston Ellis, president of Ohio University
- John Feldmeier, professor of Political Science at Wright State University and First Amendment attorney
- Grayson L. Kirk, former president of Columbia University
- Benjamin Lee, theoretical physicist
- Carolyn Ringer Lepre, academic administrator
- Jeffrey Lieberman, president of American Psychiatric Association; chief of psychiatry at Columbia University
- Henry Mitchell MacCracken, former chancellor of New York University
- Arman Manukyan, professor at Bogazici University in Istanbul
- Jeffrey McKee, biological anthropologist, academic, and author
- Fannie Ruth Robinson, president of Oxford College until 1893
- Mark B. Rosenberg, chancellor of the State University System of Florida
- Donna Shalala, former U.S. Secretary of Health and Human Services for President Bill Clinton, current president of the University of Miami (Florida) and a graduate of the Western College for Women prior to its merger with Miami University
- Ernest H. Volwiler, former chairman, Abbott Labs and co-inventor, Pentothal
- Joseph Widney, 2nd president of the University of Southern California, 1st dean of the USC School of Medicine, physician of scientific medical data; former director of the United States Public Health Service; former director of the New York Public Library; enlisted by philanthropist Andrew Carnegie to help develop a worldwide library system, resulting in the Carnegie libraries
- Richard K. Wilson, director, The Genome Institute at Washington University in St. Louis

=== Art ===
- Fletcher Benton, sculptor and painter
- Leslie Greene Bowman, art curator and museum administrator
- Austin Kleon, artist
- Roger Welch, artist

=== Business ===
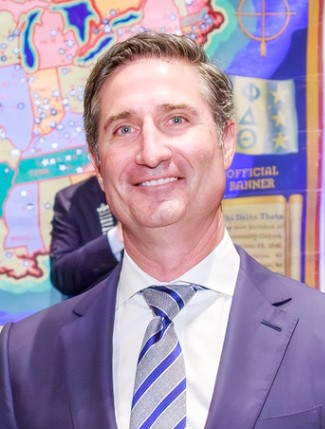
Brian Niccol, chairman and chief executive officer of Starbucks

- C. Michael Armstrong, former CEO of AT&T, Hughes Electronics and Comcast Corporation; former chairman of the IBM World Trade Corporation
- Mohammed Al Barwani, Omani billionaire and chairman of MB Holding
- Arthur D. Collins, Jr., chairman (retired), Medtronic, Inc.
- Emily E. Douglas, CEO and founder of Grandma's Gifts Inc.
- Bruce Downey, CEO of Barr Pharmaceuticals
- Richard T. Farmer, founder and chairman of Cintas Corporation
- Tom Fox, CEO of Aston Villa football club, England
- Lynn Good, chairman, president and CEO of Duke Energy
- Ryan Graves, billionaire, former CEO of Uber
- Gregory D. Hague, entrepreneur, lawyer, author
- Samuel Laws, inventor of the stock ticker on the New York Gold Exchange
- Marne Levine, COO of Instagram
- Kim Lubel, chairman and CEO of CST Brands
- Richard McVey, founder, chairman and CEO of MarketAxess
- Dwight Merriman, Internet executive and entrepreneur; co-founder of DoubleClick, current subsidiary of Google
- Brian Niccol, CEO of Starbucks, formerly chairman and CEO of Chipotle
- Dinesh Paliwal, chairman, CEO and president of Harman International
- John H. Patterson, founder of NCR (National Cash Register)
- Mitchell Rales, co-founder, CEO, and current chairman of the executive committee and director of Danaher Corporation
- Jack Rogers, chairman of the board and CEO of United Parcel Service (retired)
- Jeff Schwartz, founder and president of Excel Sports Management
- John G. Smale, CEO at Procter & Gamble; chairman of General Motors

=== Entertainment ===
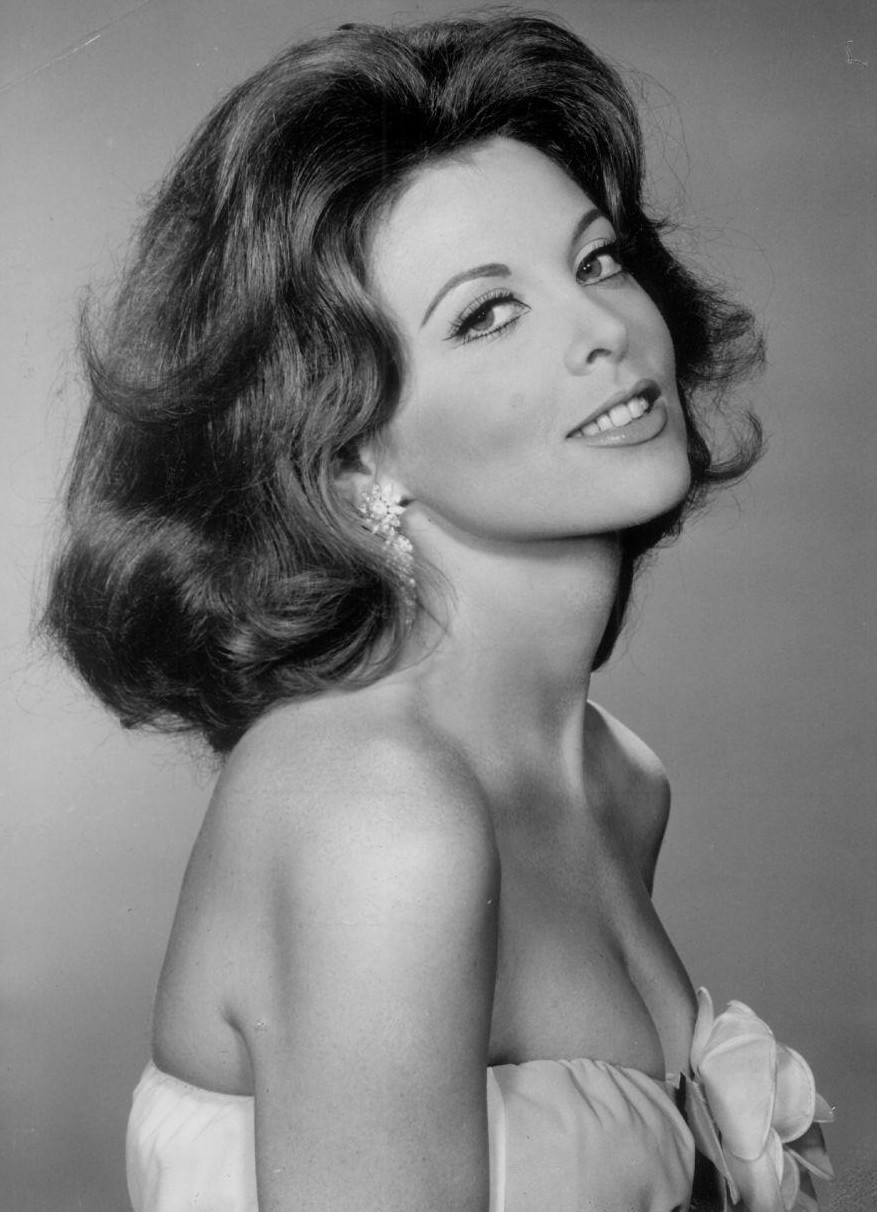
Tina Louise, actress

- Kirk Baily, actor; Kevin 'Ug' Lee on Salute Your Shorts
- Rebecca Budig, actress, All My Children
- Larry Clark, award-winning filmmaker associated with the "Los Angeles School of Black Filmmakers"
- Art Clokey, claymation artist and creator of Gumby and Pokey
- Joseph W. Clokey, organist, composer
- Ray Combs, Family Feud game show host (did not graduate)
- Chase Crawford, actor and producer (did not graduate)
- Charles Michael Davis, actor and director
- Mike Emrick, NHL play-by-play for New Jersey Devils, NBC, Versus; London and Rio Olympics announcer for NBC
- Theresa Flaminio, musician
- Bill Hemmer, Fox News Channel anchor
- Mark Hentemann, executive producer of Family Guy
- Griffin House, singer/songwriter
- Nick Lachey, pop musician; 98 Degrees (did not graduate)
- Eric Lange, television and movie actor
- Katie Lee, television personality, food critic, and ex-wife of pop music superstar Billy Joel
- The Lemon Pipers, 1960s psychedelic band
- Tina Louise, actress; Ginger on Gilligan's Island
- Rick Ludwin, NBC television executive
- Terence Moore, sports journalist, CNN.com, AOL FanHouse, sports on Earth.com, ESPN Outside the Lines, MSNBC
- Mojo Nixon, musician
- Jeff Pegues, CBS News correspondent; former Miami football player (wide receiver)
- Plies, rapper
- Steven Reineke, conductor of The New York Pops
- Jackson Rohm, pop/country musician
- Chris Rose, sportscaster
- Kristen Erwin Schlotman, film producer
- Beth Stelling, comedian
- Kate Voegele, singer, songwriter, guitarist, and pianist; also known for a prominent role in CW TV series One Tree Hill (did not graduate)
- Jack Warshaw, folk singer, songwriter, musician
- John M. Watson, Sr., trombonist with Red Saunders and Count Basie Orchestras; educator; actor in 13 movies (The Fugitive, Soul Food) and several theater roles including the Broadway production of One Flew Over the Cuckoo's Nest
- Gerri Willis, television news journalist; host of The Willis Report on Fox Business Network; formerly with CNN hosting Your Bottom Line and as the senior financial correspondent of SmartMoney
- Matthew Yuricich, Academy Award winner, special effects

=== Law ===
- James M. Alexander, judge of the Michigan Sixth Judicial Circuit Court (2001–2020)
- Frederic W. Allen, chief justice of the Vermont Supreme Court (1984–1997)
- Burnie Bridge, judge of the Wisconsin Court of Appeals for the 4th district (2007–2010)
- Richard S. Brown, judge of the Wisconsin Court of Appeals for the 2nd district (1978–2015)
- Jennifer Brunner, justice of the Ohio Supreme Court (since 2021), 48th and first female Ohio secretary of state (2007–2011)
- Dana Douglas, Judge of the US Court of Appeals for the Fifth Circuit (Since 2022)
- Mike DeWine, 70th governor of Ohio (since 2019), former U.S. senator from Ohio (1995–2007), 50th Ohio attorney general (2011–2019)
- Pat DeWine, justice of the Ohio Supreme Court (since 2017)
- Lindsay C. Jenkins, Judge of the United States District Court for the Northern District of Illinois (Since 2023)
- John F. Kibbey, fifth Indiana attorney general (1862)
- Jeremy Kudon, chairman of the Sports Betting Alliance and executive director of the American Innovators Network (AIN)
- Samuel Taylor Marshall, lawyer and founder of Beta Theta Pi
- John Weld Peck II, judge of the United States Court of Appeals for the Sixth Circuit (1966–1993)
- George E. Pugh, U.S. senator from Ohio (1855–1861), third Ohio attorney general (1852–1854)
- Camille Stewart, cybersecurity attorney
- Anthony Thornton, justice of the Supreme Court of Illinois (1870–1873) and U.S. representative from Illinois (1865–1867)
- Andy Vollmer, acting general counsel of the United States Securities and Exchange Commission (2009)

=== Literature and journalism ===
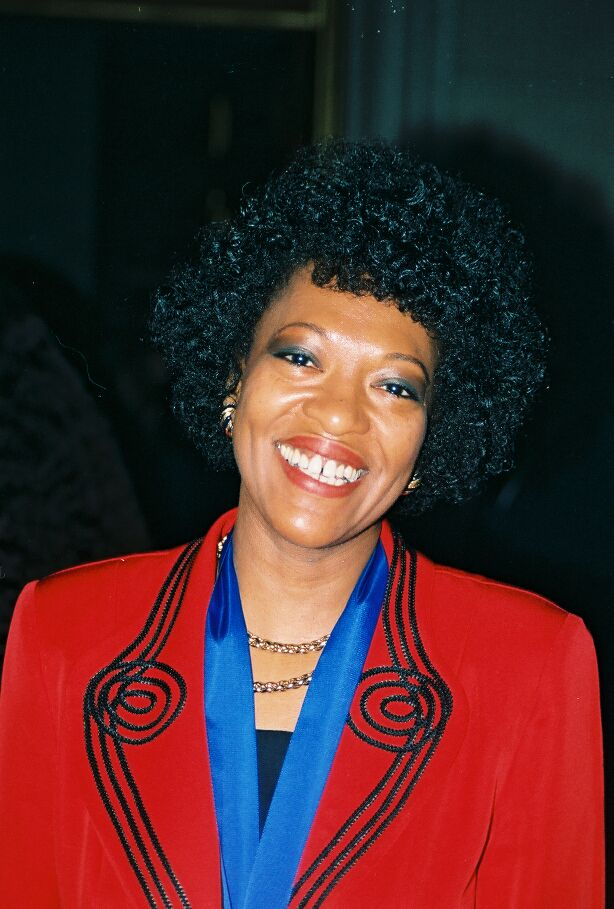
Rita Dove, Pulitzer Prize winner and first African-American U.S. Poet Laureate

- Ira Berkow, sports writer, The New York Times
- Kathryn Craft, author of literary fiction and contemporary women's fiction
- Rita Dove, Pulitzer Prize winner; first African-American U.S. Poet Laureate; consultant to the Library of Congress; 2012 recipient, Presidential National Medal of Arts Award
- Eric Ehrmann, columnist, sports and global affairs, Huffington Post, LePost-LeMonde, pioneer contributor to Rolling Stone in 1968, member of PEN (dropped out 1968)
- Ina Fried, technology journalist for Axios
- Wil Haygood, Washington Post writer; author of A Butler Well Served by This Election, inspiration for the movie The Butler, Two on the River, King of Cats: The Life and Times of Adam Clayton Powell Jr., and The Haygoods of Columbus: A Love Story
- Dave Hyde, sports columnist, Sun Sentinel
- Rajiv Joseph, dramatist and Pulitzer Prize finalist
- Alexander C. McClurg, senior partner of A. C. McClurg and Union Army general
- Dorothy Misener Jurney, the "godmother of women's pages" (Western College)
- P. J. O'Rourke, conservative satirist
- Marvin Pierce, former president of McCall Corporation, father of First Lady Barbara Bush
- Whitelaw Reid, editor-in-chief, New York Tribune; US vice presidential candidate with President Benjamin Harrison (the only time in US history that presidential and vice presidential candidates were alumni of the same university)
- Bill Sammon, senior White House correspondent, Washington Examiner, formerly at the Washington Times; and political analyst for Fox News Channel, and the author of four New York Times bestsellers
- David Teeuwen (1970–2015), managing editor of USA Today, where he helped pioneer digital news
- Joseph Widney, prolific author

=== Military ===
- Stan Arthur, U.S. Navy admiral
- Stuart P. Baker, U.S. Navy admiral
- Joseph R. Davis, C.S. Army general and commanding general of the Mississippi National Guard 1888–1895
- Arthur F. Gorham, U.S. Army Distinguished Service Cross recipient
- Terrence C. Graves, U.S. Marine Corps Medal of Honor recipient
- James G. Jones, U.S. Air Force general
- Thomas E. Kuenning Jr., U.S. Air Force general
- Robert J. Meder, U.S. Army Air Forces pilot and participant in the Doolittle Raid
- Joseph Ralston, U.S. Air Force general and commander of the U.S. European Command/SHAPE 2000–2003
- William W. Rogers, U.S. Marine Corps general
- Stephen Clegg Rowan, U.S. Navy admiral
- Durbin Ward, U.S. Army general
- Lester J. Whitlock, U.S. Army major general

=== Politics ===
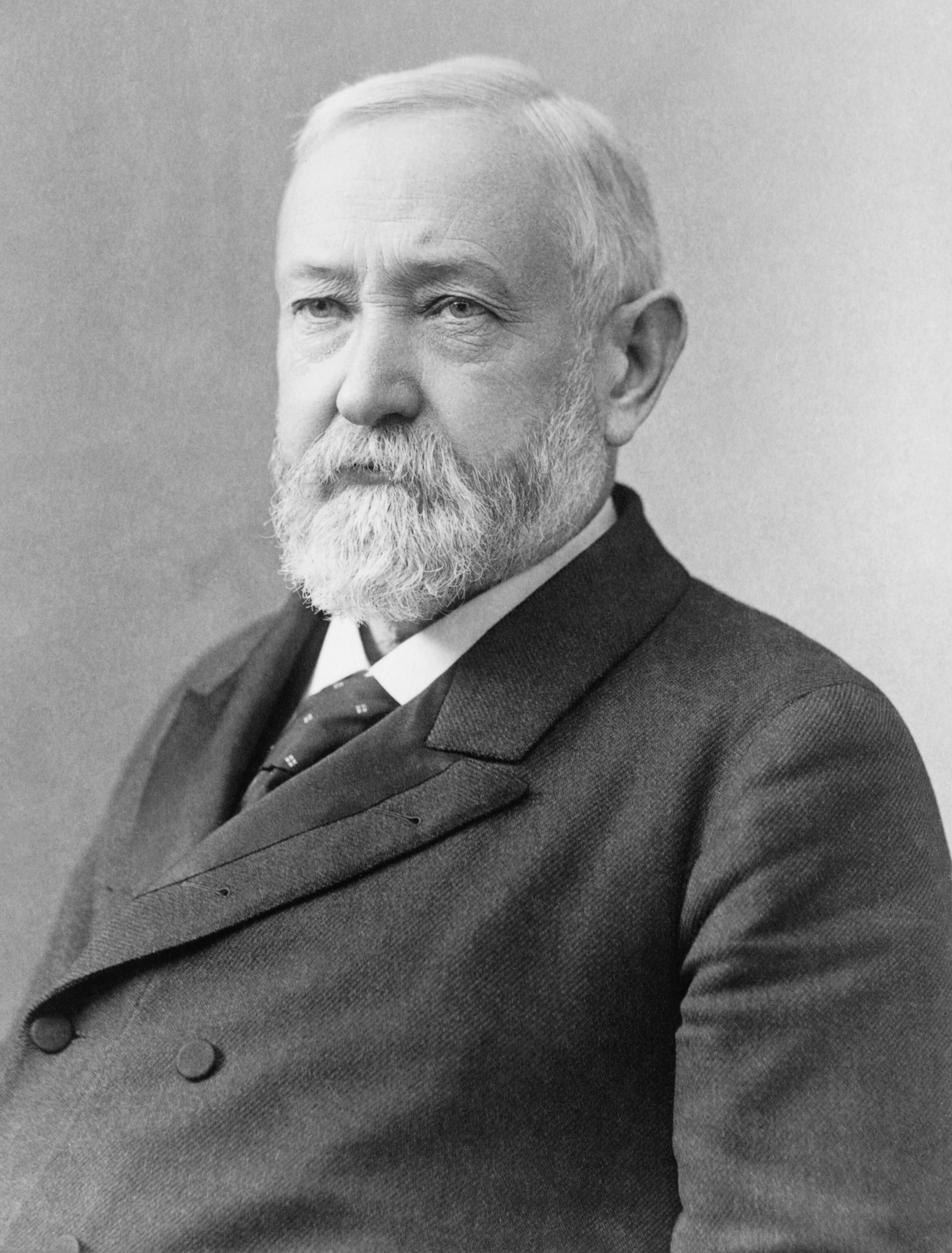
Benjamin Harrison, 23rd president of the United States

==== Presidents and prime ministers ====
- Benjamin Harrison, 23rd president of the United States (1889–1893)
- Chung Un-chan, 36th prime minister of South Korea (2009–2010)

==== U.S. Senate ====
- Calvin S. Brice, U.S. senator from Ohio (1891–1897), railroad magnate and campaign manager for Grover Cleveland's U.S. presidential campaign against Brice's fellow Miami alumnus, Benjamin Harrison
- Maria Cantwell, U.S. senator from Washington (since 2001)
- Mike DeWine, 70th governor of Ohio (since 2019), former U.S. senator from Ohio (1995–2007), 50th Ohio attorney general (2011–2019)
- John J. McRae, U.S. senator from Mississippi (1851–1852), 21st governor of Mississippi (1854–1857), U.S. representative from Mississippi (1858–1861)
- Oliver P. Morton, U.S. senator from Indiana (1867–1877), 14th governor of Indiana (1861–1867)
- George E. Pugh, U.S. senator from Ohio (1855–1861), third Ohio attorney general (1852–1854)
- John B. Weller, U.S. senator from California (1852–1857), fifth governor of California (1858–1860), U.S. representative from Ohio (1839–45), U.S. minister to Mexico (1861)

==== U.S. House of Representatives ====
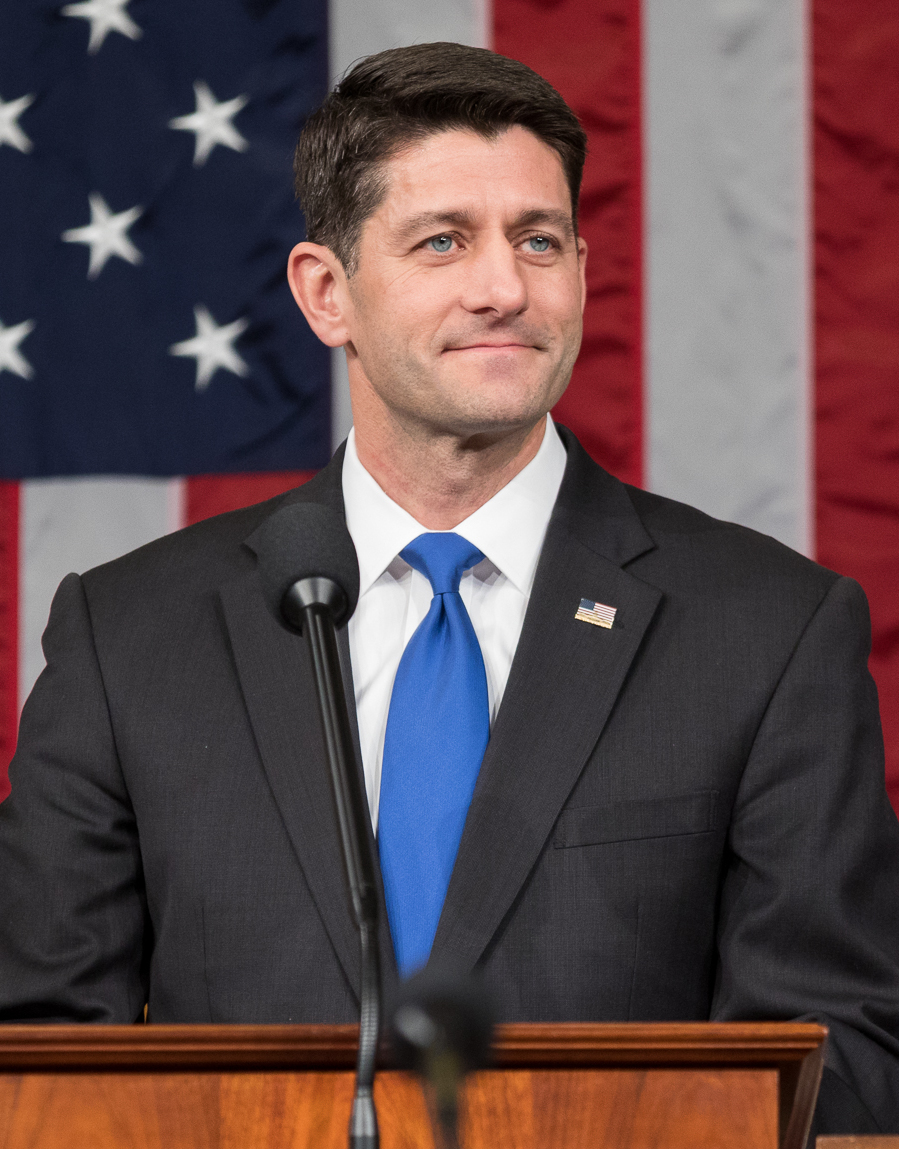
Paul Ryan, 54th speaker of the U.S. House of Representatives

- Susan Brooks, U.S. representative from Indiana (2013–2021)
- Ozro J. Dodds, U.S. representative from Ohio (1872–1873)
- Steve Driehaus, U.S. representative from Ohio (2009–2011)
- Samuel Galloway, U.S. representative from Ohio (1855–1857)
- Isaac M. Jordan, U.S. representative from Ohio (1883–1885)
- Michael Oxley, U.S. representative from Ohio (1981–2007) and co-sponsor of the Sarbanes–Oxley Act
- Paul Ryan, 54th speaker of the U.S. House of Representatives (2015–2019); 2012 Republican vice presidential candidate; U.S. representative from Wisconsin (1999–2019)
- Milton Sayler, U.S. representative from Ohio (1873–1879)
- Caleb B. Smith, sixth U.S. secretary of the interior (1861–1863), U.S. representative from Indiana (1843–1849), federal judge
- David Taylor, U.S. representative from Ohio (since 2025)
- Anthony Thornton, justice of the Illinois Supreme Court (1870–1873) and U.S. representative from Illinois (1865–1867)

==== Governors ====
- Charles Anderson, 27th governor of Ohio (1865–1866)
- James E. Campbell, 38th governor of Ohio (1890–1892)
- William Dennison Jr., 24th governor of Ohio (1860–1862) and U.S. Postmaster General
- Mike DeWine, 70th governor of Ohio (since 2019), former U.S. senator from Ohio (1995–2007), 50th Ohio attorney general (2011–2019)
- Andrew L. Harris, 44th governor of Ohio (1906–1909), U.S. commissioner, American Civil War General
- John J. McRae, U.S. senator from Mississippi (1851–1852), 21st governor of Mississippi (1854–1857), U.S. Representative from Mississippi (1858–1861)
- Oliver P. Morton, U.S. senator from Indiana (1867–1877), 14th governor of Indiana (1861–1867)
- John B. Weller, U.S. senator from California (1852–1857), fifth governor of California (1858–1860), U.S. representative from Ohio (1839–45), U.S. minister to Mexico (1861)

==== State ====
- Jennifer Brunner, justice of the Ohio Supreme Court (since 2021), 48th and first female Ohio secretary of state (2007–2011)
- Sara Carruthers, member of the Ohio House of Representatives
- Courtney Combs, member of Ohio House of Representatives
- Timothy Derickson, member of Ohio House of Representatives
- Denise Driehaus, member of Ohio House of Representatives
- Thomas Hall, member of Ohio House of Representatives
- Janet Greenip, Maryland state senator
- Helen Jones-Kelley, former director of the Ohio Department of Job and Family Services
- Dave Karmol, member of Ohio House of Representatives
- Steve Wilson, current State Senator for Ohio's 7th Districts, former CEO of Lebanon Citizens National Bank

==== Local ====
- Michael Cabonargi, commissioner of the Cook County Board of Review (2011–2022), regional director of the U.S. Department of Health and Human Services (2023–2025)
- Herman Goldner, mayor of St. Petersburg, Florida (1961–1967, 1971–1973)
- Paul Muenzer, mayor of Naples, Florida (1992–1996)
- Yvette Simpson, member of the Cincinnati City Council (2011–2018)

==== Ambassadors ====
- John E. Dolibois, U.S. ambassador to Luxembourg (1981–1985) and interrogator at the Nuremberg Trials
- Shefali Razdan Duggal, U.S. ambassador to the Netherlands (2022–2025)
- Edwin Dun, U.S. minister to Japan (1893–1897), o-yatoi gaikokujin and advised the Meiji government on modernizing agricultural techniques
- Kenneth H. Merten, U.S. ambassador to Haiti (2009–2012), U.S. ambassador to Croatia (2012–2015), U.S. ambassador to Bulgaria (2023–2025)
- Whitelaw Reid, U.S. minister to France (1889–1892), U.S. ambassador to the United Kingdom (1905–1912)
- John B. Weller, U.S. senator from California (1852–1857), fifth governor of California (1858–1860), U.S. representative from Ohio (1839–45), U.S. minister to Mexico (1861)

==== Cabinet members and other politicians ====
- Stan Greenberg, Democratic Party pollster and campaign strategist
- William Isaac, chairman of the Federal Deposit Insurance Corporation (1981–1985)
- Stephen Mandel, leader of the Alberta Party (2018–2019), Alberta minister of health (2014–2015), mayor of Edmonton (2004–2013)
- Brigham McCown, former U.S. Department of Transportation regulator during the George W. Bush administration
- Vinay Reddy, White House director of speechwriting (2021–2025)
- Steve Ricchetti, counselor to the president; chief of staff to US Vice President Joe Biden; former deputy chief of staff to President Bill Clinton
- Michael Sekora, founder and director of the intelligence community's classified program, Project Socrates, during the Reagan administration
- Caleb B. Smith, sixth U.S. secretary of the interior (1861–1863), U.S. representative from Indiana (1843–1849), federal judge
- Sidney Souers, first director of U.S. central intelligence

=== Science ===
- Benjamin W. Lee, theoretical physicist

=== Sports ===
==== Baseball ====
- Walter Alston (1935), former manager of the Brooklyn and Los Angeles Dodgers baseball teams; earned four World Series championships and seven National League pennants
- Bill Doran, former second baseman for the Houston Astros, Cincinnati Reds, and Milwaukee Brewers; bench coach, Kansas City Royals
- Adam Eaton, former center fielder with Washington Nationals, Chicago White Sox and Arizona Diamondbacks
- John Ely, Major League Baseball pitcher, Los Angeles Dodgers
- Steve Fireovid, former Major League Baseball pitcher and author of The 26th Man: One Minor League Pitcher's Pursuit of a Dream
- Danny Hall (1977), head baseball coach, Georgia Tech
- Charlie Leibrandt (1978), former pitcher for the Cincinnati Reds, Kansas City Royals, Atlanta Braves, and Texas Rangers; 140-119 Major League record
- Bill Long, former pitcher in Major League Baseball, played for the Chicago White Sox, Chicago Cubs and Montreal Expos
- Marvin Miller, union leader Major League Baseball Players Association (attended Miami University before transferring to and graduating from NYU)
- Tim Naehring, former MLB player, Boston Red Sox
- Ty Neal (1999), college baseball coach at Cincinnati
- Scott Sauerbeck, Major League Baseball pitcher, Cincinnati Reds

==== Basketball ====
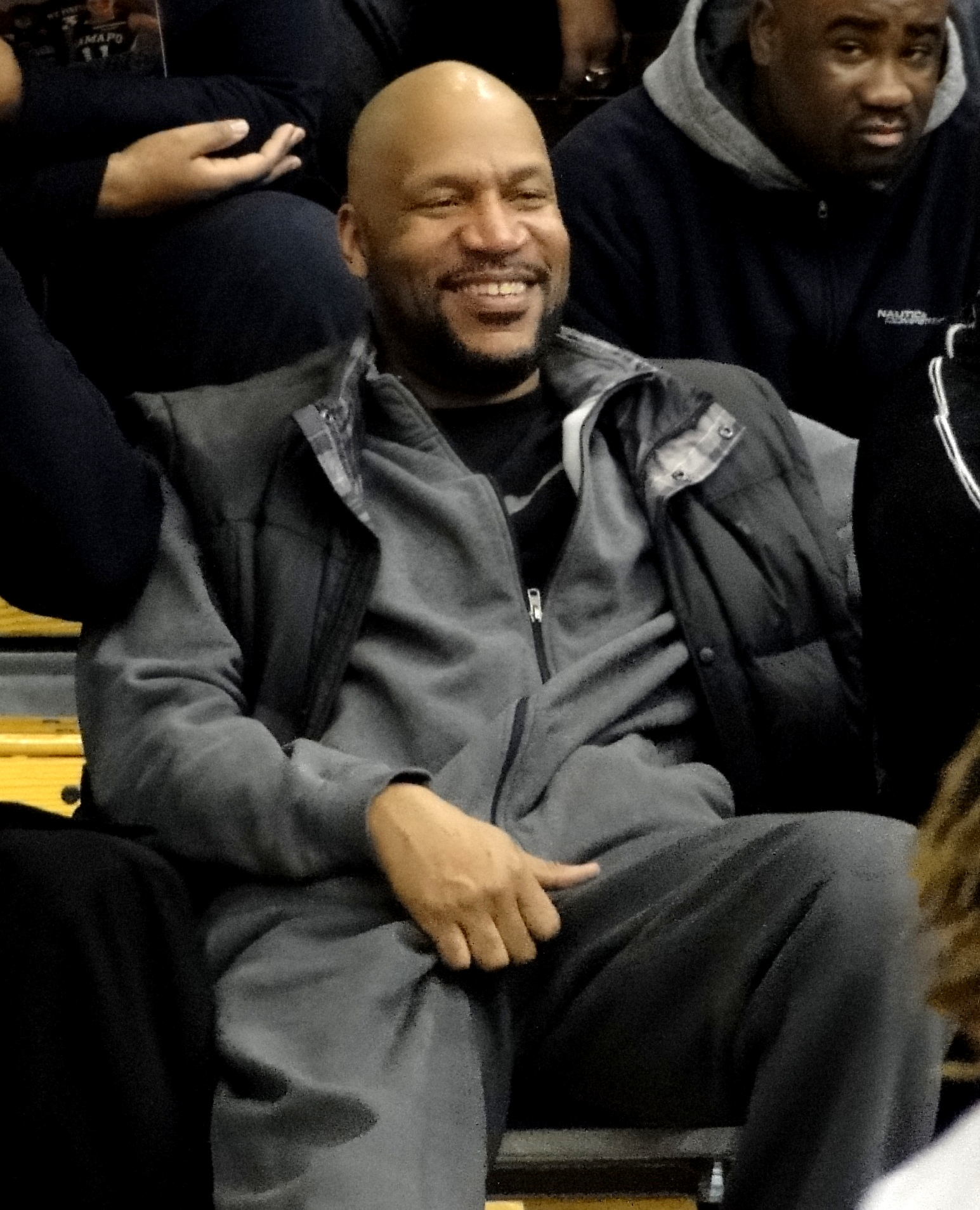
Ron Harper, five-time NBA champion

- Randy Ayers (1978), former NBA player and college head coach at Ohio State University and head coach of the NBA's Philadelphia 76ers, assistant coach of the Orlando Magic and current assistant coach of NBA Washington Wizards
- Michael Bramos, professional basketball player; joined the Spanish ACB League club Gran Canaria in 2010
- Wayne Embry (1958), senior advisor and former general manager, NBA Toronto Raptors; former NBA player and NBA executive with the Milwaukee Bucks and Cleveland Cavaliers, and was the first African American NBA general manager and team president; two-time basketball All-American at Miami
- Fred Foster, former forward, NBA Portland Trail Blazers
- Ron Harper, retired NBA guard, five-time NBA Champion, Chicago Bulls and Los Angeles Lakers; coach, Detroit Pistons and Orlando Magic
- Darrell Hedric (1955), winningest basketball coach in Miami history
- Ron Hunter, head men's basketball coach, Georgia State University; formerly head men's basketball coach, IUPUI
- Phil Lumpkin (1981), guard, NBA Portland Trail Blazers and Phoenix Suns, later became a successful high school basketball coach in Washington State
- Matt Lynch (Master's, 2015), as of 2024 the only out head coach in men's college basketball
- Julian Mavunga, professional basketball player, currently with Kyoto Hannaryz of Japanese First Division
- Ira Newble, NBA player, Cleveland Cavaliers, Seattle SuperSonics and Los Angeles Lakers
- Rob Senderoff, college basketball coach
- Nike Sibande (2020), guard in the Israeli Basketball Premier League
- Wally Szczerbiak (1999), NBA forward, Cleveland Cavaliers, Boston Celtics and Minnesota Timberwolves; current CBS Sports announcer

==== Football ====
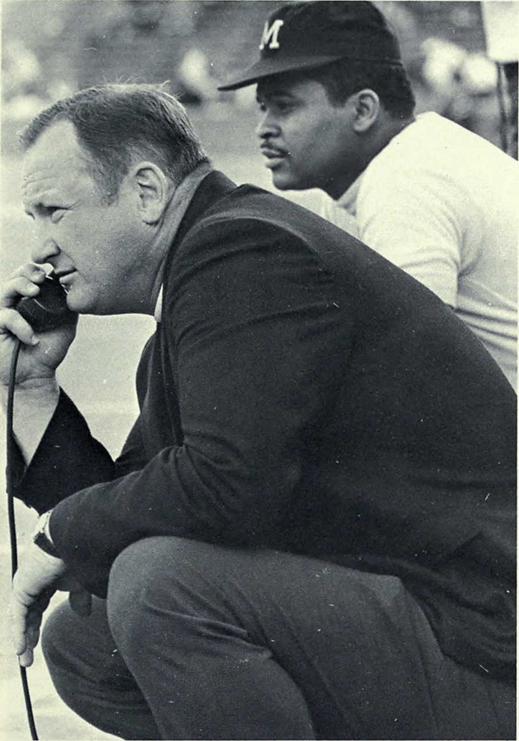
Bo Schembechler, head football coach at the University of Michigan

- Jerry Angelo, former general manager of the Chicago Bears
- JoJuan Armour, former NFL and CFL player
- Bill Arnsparger (1949), NFL coach, Baltimore Colts and Miami Dolphins, San Diego Chargers; NCAA football coach; head coach, LSU; athletic director, University of Florida
- Bob Babich (1969), former NFL player, San Diego Chargers and Cleveland Browns; First-Team All-American in football
- Jacob Bell, NFL, St. Louis Rams
- Eric Beverly, NFL player, Detroit Lions and Atlanta Falcons
- Earl "Red" Blaik (1918), former head coach, Army football; member of the NFL Foundation Hall of Fame
- Brandon Brooks, NFL player, Philadelphia Eagles and Houston Texans
- Paul Brown (1930), partial founder of the Cleveland Browns and the Cincinnati Bengals and the first head coach for both teams
- Rob Carpenter (1977), NFL player, where he rushed for 4,363 yards in a 10-year career with the Houston Oilers, New York Giants and Los Angeles Rams
- Carmen Cozza (1952), former head football coach, Yale University; played in NFL for Green Bay Packers and in Cleveland Indians and Chicago White Sox organization
- Tom Crabtree, NFL tight end, Green Bay Packers
- Paul Dietzel (1948), All-American center, football; head coach, football at LSU, South Carolina and Army; National Coach of the Year
- Weeb Ewbank (1928), Super Bowl-winning NFL head coach; won two NFL titles with the Baltimore Colts and the New York Jets
- Trevor Gaylor, player, NFL, Kansas City Chiefs
- John Harbaugh (1984), head coach, New York Giants
- Bob Hitchens (1974), player, NFL, New England Patriots, Kansas City Chiefs and Pittsburgh Steelers
- Alphonso Hodge, NFL player, cornerback, Kansas City Chiefs
- Bob Jencks (1963), NFL player, Washington Redskins and Chicago Bears; Super Bowl Champions with Chicago Bears
- Ernie Kellermann (1965), former defensive back for the Cleveland Browns, Cincinnati Bengals and Buffalo Bills
- Aaron Kromer, NFL, New Orleans Saints 2012 Interim Head Coach; Offensive Line and Running Game Coach
- Bill Mallory (1957), head football coach, Miami University, University of Colorado at Boulder, Indiana University Bloomington; Big Ten Coach of the Year
- Ryan McNeil, former NFL player
- John McVay (1953), former head coach, New York Giants; general manager, San Francisco 49ers (5 Super Bowl Championships; NFL Executive of the Year winner)
- Sean McVay, head coach, Los Angeles Rams (youngest head coach in NFL history); tight ends coach, Washington Redskins
- Jake O'Connell, tight end, NFL, Kansas City Chiefs
- Henry Orth, football player
- Ara Parseghian (1949), former head football coach of the Notre Dame Fighting Irish
- John Pont (1952), head football coach, Miami University, Yale University, Indiana University, Northwestern University; national Coach of the Year; led Indiana to Big Ten title and Rose Bowl
- Travis Prentice, retired NFL player, NCAA Division I-A Career leader in points scored, Cleveland Browns, Minnesota Vikings
- Ryne Robinson, NFL player, Carolina Panthers
- Ben Roethlisberger (2012), NFL player, two-time Super Bowl-winning quarterback for the Pittsburgh Steelers
- Quinten Rollins, NFL player, Green Bay Packers
- Ollie Savatsky, NFL player, Cleveland Rams
- Bo Schembechler (1951), former football head coach of the University of Michigan Wolverines
- Sam Sloman (born 1997), NFL football player
- Sherman Smith (1976), NFL player, Seattle Seahawks; running backs coach, Seattle Seahawks; coach, Tennessee Titans; offensive coordinator, Washington Redskins
- Milt Stegall, CFL player, Winnipeg Blue Bombers, CFL all-time leader in receiving yards and touchdowns; NFL player, Cincinnati Bengals
- Alex Sulfsted, player, NFL, Kansas City Chiefs
- Jerry Walker (1971), team archivist at San Francisco 49ers; director of public relations at San Francisco 49ers; sports information director at Lorain County Community College, University of New Orleans and San Jose State; assistant SID at LSU
- Randy Walker (1976), former head football coach at Miami and Northwestern University
- Sheldon White, vice president of Pro Personnel, Detroit Lions, Inc.; former NFL player with New York Giants, Detroit Lions and Cincinnati Bengals
- Kevin Wilson, offensive coordinator, Ohio State University football team; former head coach, Indiana University football team
- Nobby Wirkowski (1951), professional football player and coach
- Ron Zook, former head football coach at the University of Illinois and University of Florida

==== Hockey ====
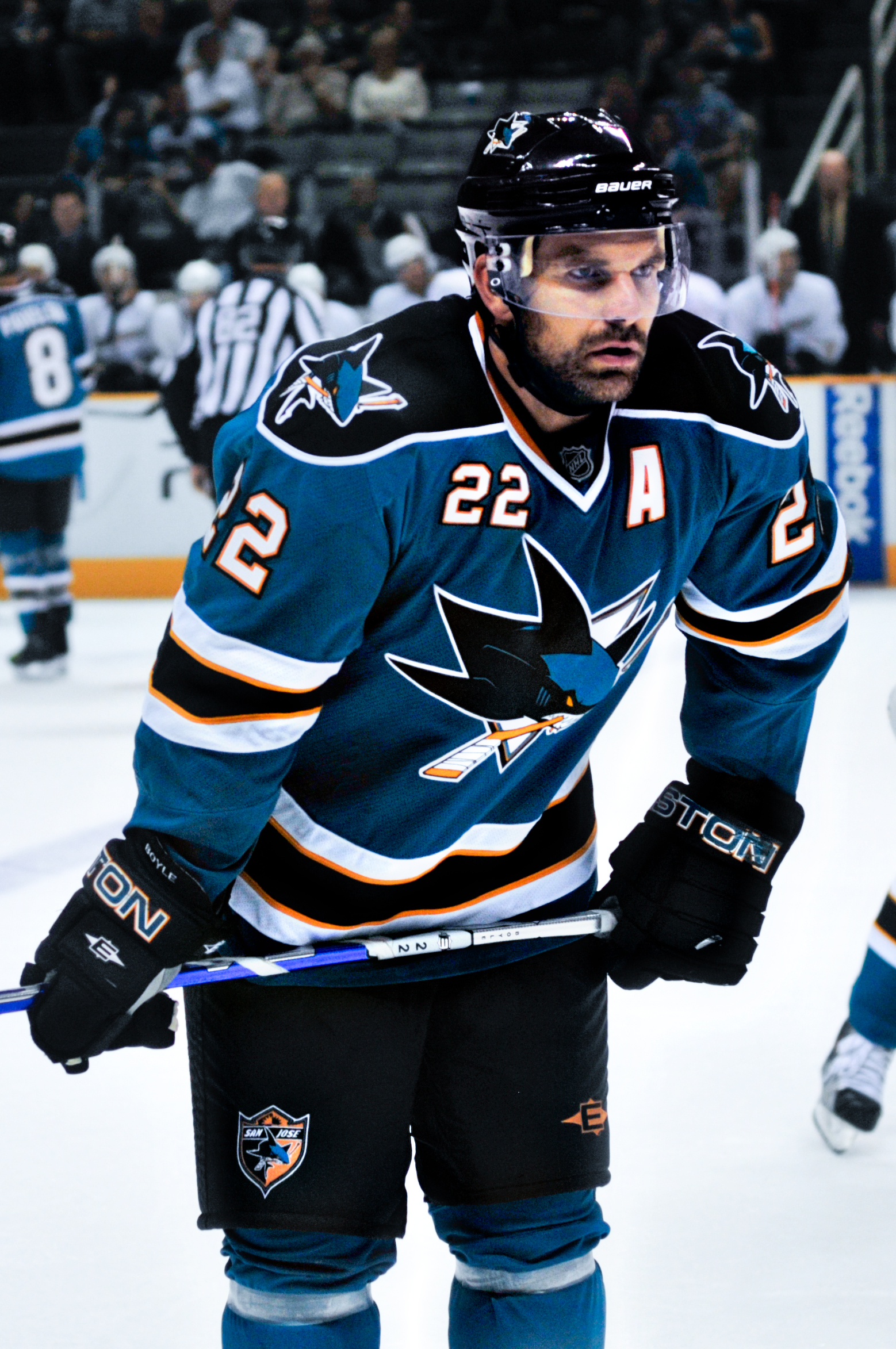
Dan Boyle, Stanley Cup winner and Olympic gold medalist ice hockey defenceman

- Kevyn Adams, former NHL player, Chicago Blackhawks; member of 2006 Stanley Cup champion Carolina Hurricanes
- Riley Barber, player, NHL, Washington Capitals
- Chris Bergeron, head men's hockey coach, former head coach at Bowling Green and former professional hockey center
- Enrico Blasi, former head men's hockey coach, Miami University; two-time recipient of national coach of the year award
- Dan Boyle (1998), NHL player for the New York Rangers and San Jose Sharks; won Stanley Cup and 2010 gold medal with Canadian Olympic Team
- Carter Camper, NHL player, New Jersey Devils; formerly, Boston Bruins
- Patrick Cannone, NHL player, Minnesota Wild
- Alain Chevrier (1984), NHL player, New Jersey Devils
- Blake Coleman, NHL player, New Jersey Devils
- Austin Czarnik, NHL player, Boston Bruins, Calgary Flames
- Mike Emrick, NHL play-by-play for New Jersey Devils, NBC, Versus; London and Rio Olympics announcer for NBC
- Mike Glumac, NHL player, St. Louis Blues
- Andy Greene, NHL player, New Jersey Devils
- Ryan Jones, NHL player, Edmonton Oilers; Nashville Predators
- Sean Kuraly, NHL player, Boston Bruins
- Vincent LoVerde, player, NHL Los Angeles Kings organization
- Alec Martinez, NHL player, three-time Stanley Cup champion, Las Vegas Golden Knights
- Curtis McKenzie, player, NHL, Dallas Stars
- Justin Mercier, NHL player, Colorado Avalanche organization
- Andy Miele, 2011 Hobey Baker Award recipient; NHL player, Philadelphia Flyers, Phoenix Coyotes
- Randy Robitaille, NHL player, Ottawa Senators
- Jack Roslovic, NHL player, Winnipeg Jets organization; member of 2017 gold medal United States World Juniors team
- Brian Savage, NHL player, Philadelphia Flyers
- Cameron Schilling, NHL player, Chicago Blackhawks; and Washington Capitals organization
- Reilly Smith, NHL player, Florida Panthers, formerly Boston Bruins and Dallas Stars
- Gary Steffes, professional hockey player, AHL, varied teams; member of Team USA at the 2005 IIHF World U18 Championships
- Justin Vaive, player, NHL New York Islanders organization
- Trent Vogelhuber, player, NHL Colorado Avalanche, Columbus Blue Jackets organization
- Chris Wideman, NHL player, Ottawa Senators
- Hayley Williams, Russian Women's Hockey League player
- Tommy Wingels, NHL player, San Jose Sharks
- Jeff Zatkoff, NHL goaltender, Los Angeles Kings, Pittsburgh Penguins; member of 2016 Stanley Cup champion Pittsburgh Penguins

==== Wrestling ====
- Mark Coleman (1985–1987), NCAA All-American wrestler who placed 4th in 1986 (190lbs), retired professional mixed martial artist, first ever UFC Heavyweight Champion and UFC Hall of Fame member
- Mike Mizanin, aka The Miz, WWE wrestler/entertainer
- Brian Pillman, professional wrestler

==== Other sports ====
- Dave Abelson (born 1975), Canadian tennis player
- Brad Adamonis, professional golfer who currently plays on the PGA Tour
- Jack Baruth, pro BMX rider and Alt Fuel class winner of the 2006 Cannonball Run
- Brendan Burke, inspiration for You Can Play organization
- Bud Haidet (1957), athletic director, University of Wisconsin–Milwaukee; instrumental in their move from NAIA to NCAA Division I membership in 1990
- Bill Mulliken (1961), 1960 Olympic gold medalist, swimming
- Bob Schul (1966), 1964 Olympic gold medalist, 5000m run
- Amelia Strickler, British shot putter; 3-time National Champion; European, Commonwealth and World finalist
- Steve Strome (1964), tennis coach, Miami, LSU, Duke and Army

=== Theology ===
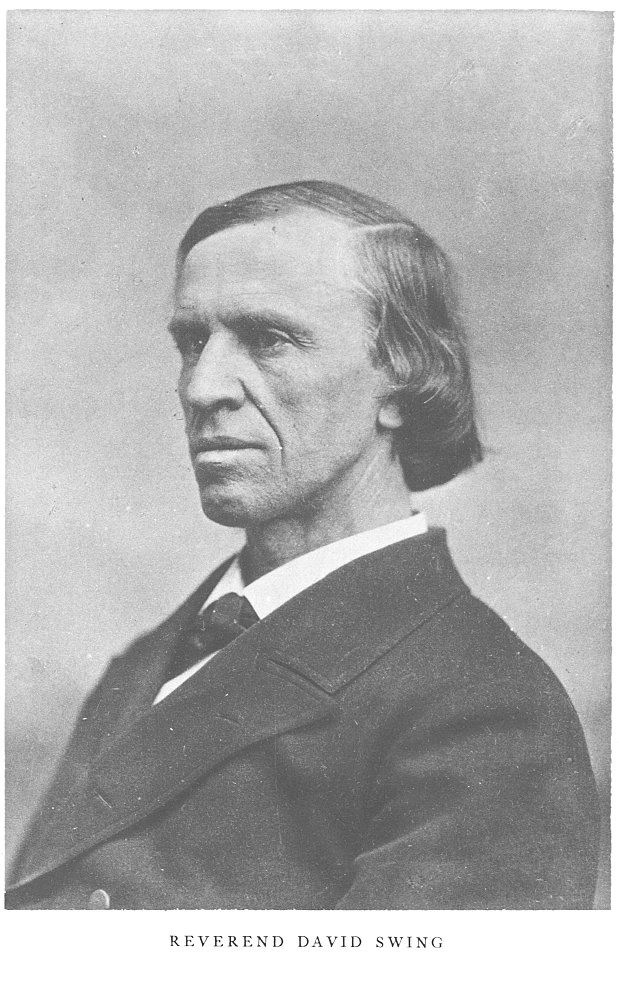
David Swing, preacher and liberal theologian

- Joseph R. Binzer, auxiliary bishop of the Archdiocese of Cincinnati, 2011–2020
- David Swing, 19th-century preacher and liberal theologian; confidant of Abraham Lincoln and Mary Todd Lincoln
- William McClure Thomson, 19th-century missionary based in Lebanon
- Walter Wangerin, Jr., theologian and award-winning author
- Joseph Pomeroy Widney, co-founder of the Church of the Nazarene and the Church of the All-Father

== Notable faculty and staff ==
=== Faculty ===
- José Antonio Bowen, president of Goucher College
- Raymond Burke, instructor, businessman, founder of the Miami University Men's Glee Club and member of the United States House of Representatives from Ohio's third district
- Karen Dawisha, political scientist, author of Putin's Kleptocracy
- Burton L. French, professor and member of the United States House of Representatives from Idaho's 1st congressional district
- Walter Havighurst, English professor and namesake of the Havighurst Center for Russian and Post-Soviet Studies
- Daisy Hernández, writer and editor
- Louise Holland, academic, philologist and archaeologist
- William Holmes McGuffey
- Donald E. Parker, experimental psychologist and professor emeritus

=== Presidents of Miami University ===
The following persons have served as president of Miami University:

No.	Image	President	Term start	Term end	Refs.
1		Robert Hamilton Bishop	1824	1841	
2		George Junkin	1841	1844	
3		Erasmus D. MacMaster	1845	1849	
4		William Caldwell Anderson	1849	1854	
pro tem		Orange Nash Stoddard	1854	1854	
5		John W. Hall	1854	1866	
6		Robert L. Stanton	1866	1871	
pro tem 7		Andrew Dousa Hepburn (Note: pro tempore; later considered to be regular)	1871	1873	
pro tem 8		Robert White McFarland (Note: pro tempore; later considered to be regular)	1885	1888	
9		Ethelbert Dudley Warfield	1888	1891	
10		William Oxley Thompson	1891	1899	
11		David Stanton Tappan	1899	1902	
12		Guy Potter Benton	1902	1911	
acting		Edgar Ewing Brandon	1909	1910	
acting		Raymond M. Hughes	1911	1913	
13		Raymond M. Hughes	1913	1927 (Note: resigned to head Iowa State University)	
acting		Edgar Ewing Brandon	1927	1928	
14		Alfred H. Upham	1928	1945	
acting		Alpheus K. Morris	1945	1946	
15		Ernest H. Hahne	1946	1952	
acting		Clarence W. Kreger	1952	1953	
16		John D. Millett	1953	1964	
acting		Charles Ray Wilson	1964	1965	
17		Phillip R. Shriver	1965	1981	
18		Paul G. Pearson	1981	1992	
19		Paul G. Risser	1993	1995 (Note: resigned to head Oregon State University)	
acting		Anne Hopkins	December 1995	July 31, 1996	
20		James C. Garland	August 1, 1996	June 30, 2006	
21		David C. Hodge	July 1, 2006	June 30, 2016	
22		Greg Crawford	July 1, 2016	present	

Table notes:

== See also ==
- Cradle of Coaches
