= Harrison Hall =

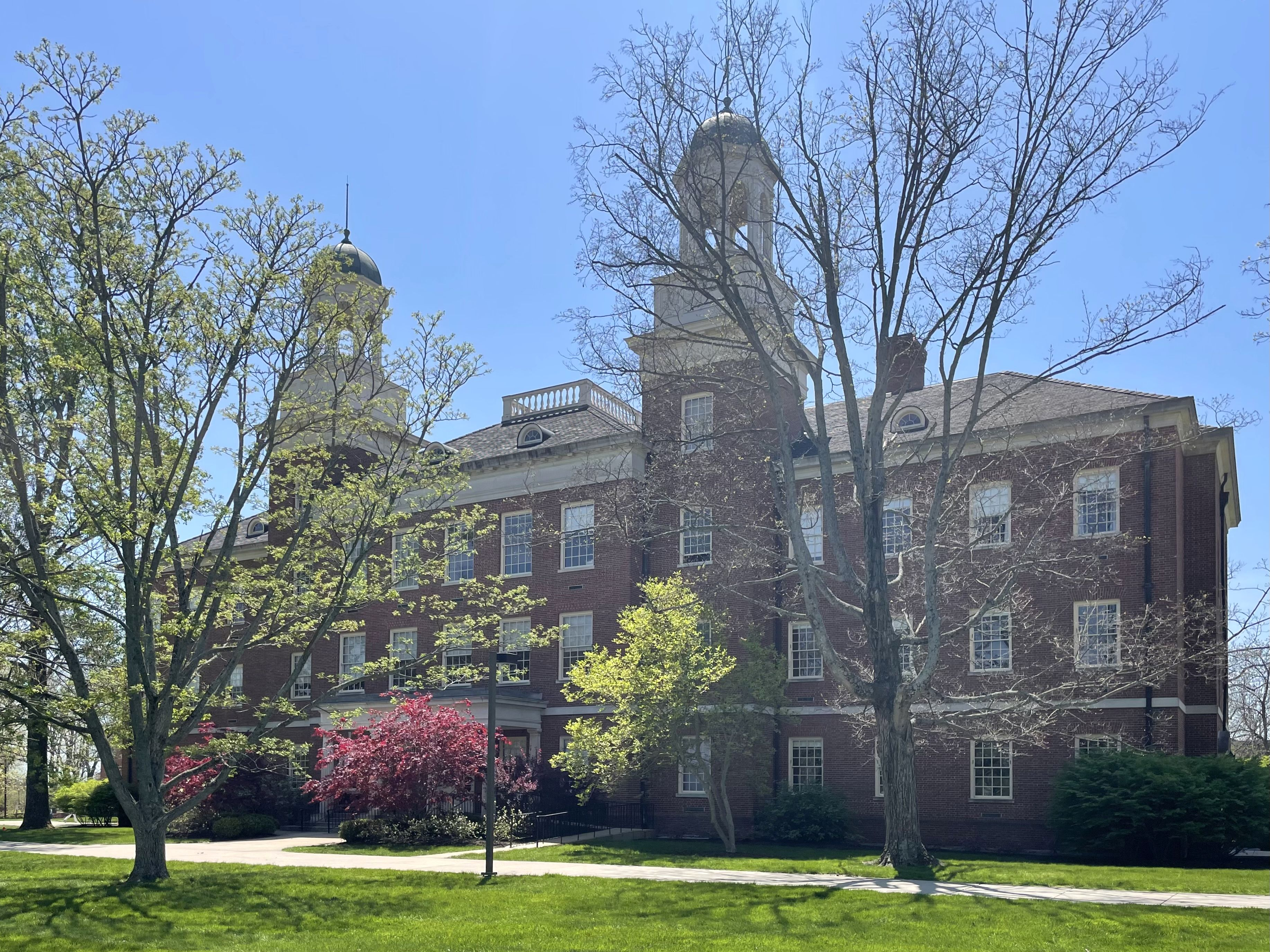
- Harrison Hall at Miami University in 2022
- Interactive map of the Harrison Hall area

General information
- Type: Academic
- Architectural style: Georgian
- Location: Oxford, Ohio, United States, 349 East High Street, Oxford, OH 45056
- Coordinates: 39°30′32.3″N 84°44′11.0″W
- Completed: 1960
- Cost: $1,004,000

Technical details
- Floor area: 40,000 GSF

Design and construction
- Architects: Cellarius & Hilmer
- Main contractor: Frank Messer & Sons

Harrison Hall is an academic building on the campus of Miami University housing the Department of Political Science and the Center for Public Management and Regional Affairs. It replaced an earlier building on the site built in 1818 and demolished in 1958. The original building was first named Franklin Hall, and became known as Old Main by the student body. It was officially renamed to Harrison Hall in 1931 after the 23rd President of the United States, Benjamin Harrison, who was a Miami University alumnus.

== Original structure (1816–1958) ==
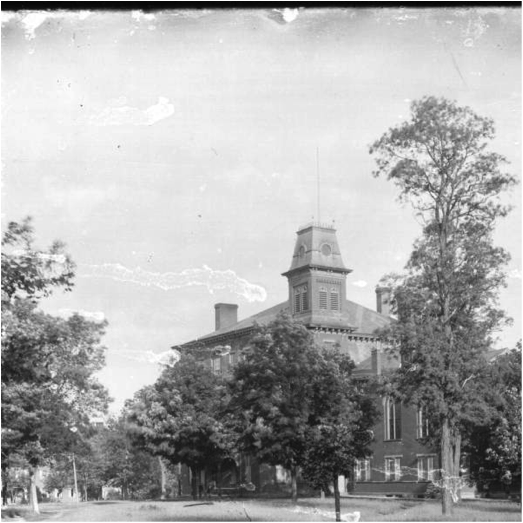
A picture of Franklin Hall, or Old Main, taken before the construction of the East Wing.

Construction for the original Harrison Hall, then known as Franklin Hall, began in 1816, shortly after the completion of the log schoolhouse in the University Square in 1811. The central part of the building was completed in 1818, and various additions were made to the building afterwards. The west wing of the building was added in 1868 following the Civil War, and the east wing was built in 1898.

The first day of classes at Miami University began on November 1, 1824 in Franklin Hall, which was the only classroom building on campus at that time. Over the years, Franklin Hall came to be known as Old Main by students due to it being the central building on campus, as was common at universities.

The first two student organizations, the Erodelphian and the Union Literary Societies, began in 1825 and met on Friday evenings on the third floor of Old Main, debating issues involving social and economic progress, including slavery and feminism. Other organizations began forming as well, including fraternities. Beta Theta Pi was founded in 1839 at Old Main at Miami University and was the first of the Miami Triad of fraternities to be founded there.

=== Student and faculty conflicts ===
Disputes between the administration and fraternities reached a tipping point on January 12, 1848 with the Snowball Rebellion. Numerous students, many of whom were fraternity members, rolled snowballs up to the entrance of Old Main and blocked it, which was discovered early the next morning by the janitor, who informed then President Erasmus D. MacMaster of the snowballs. President MacMaster informed the faculty and students later that day at a chapel meeting, which all students and faculty members were required to attend, that those involved in the incident with Old Main would be expelled. This ultimately backfired though, for the following night even more students broke into Old Main and packed the main floor with snow, along with chairs, tables, benches, and the entire wood fuel supply for the winter, which then froze overnight. MacMaster expelled all students involved over the next two weeks, and Miami’s enrollment fell to 68 students. However, not wanting to close the university, the Board of Trustees fired MacMaster and hired William Anderson as the next president, who allowed Phi Delta Theta fraternity to be formed in December 1848.

=== Later history ===
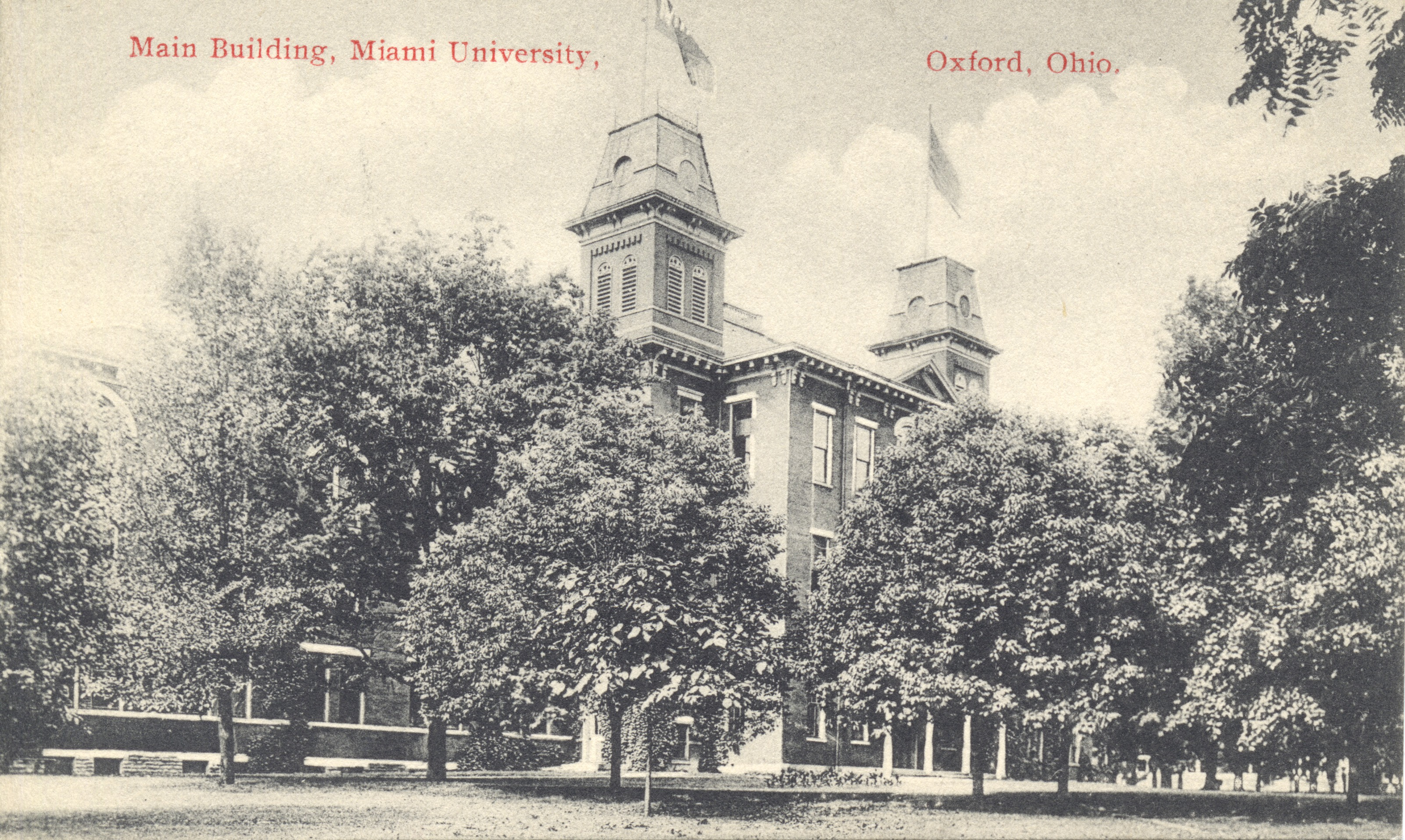
The original Harrison Hall after completion.

Old Main was home to not only academic tradition but also to athletic tradition. The bell in the rivalry for the Victory Bell between the University of Cincinnati and Miami University, who square off each year in football, originally hung in Old Main, which was near where the first football game was played in 1888. The Bell was rung for Miami victories and remained at Old Main until it began traveling with the winning team in the 1890s. Phi Kappa Tau fraternity was founded in the Union Literary Society Hall in Old Main in 1906.

Franklin Hall was officially renamed Harrison Hall in 1931 after President Benjamin Harrison, who was an alumnus of the university.

Before the construction of the new Harrison Hall, a fire occurred in December 1946. It was spotted by a group of students on Sunday, December 1 at 7:45 p.m. resulting in 150 dollars' worth of damage, and destroyed one of the stained glass windows inside of Harrison Hall. Although the cause of the fire was never determined, one of the managers of the building believed that cigarette butts were the cause for the fire.

== Second structure (1959–present) ==
On April 29, 1957, the State Department of Industrial Relations condemned any further instructional use of Harrison Hall after a building inspection. As a result, Miami allocated resources to many of the academic divisions housed within Harrison Hall to other buildings on campus including Bonham House and Ogden Hall. After this, plans for the new Harrison Hall began, which were decided upon on February 1, 1958 by the Board of Trustees. The Board stated that the new Harrison Hall should be devoted to classroom purposes and that it would house the departments of Sociology and Anthropology, Psychology, Government, and the Scripps Foundation. Bids for the construction of the new building were received on October 17, 1958 by the State Architect’s Office in Columbus and construction began in January. The cornerstone was laid on May 9, 1959 and was presided by the Chairman of the Board of Trustees, Hugh C. Nichols. A strike that began on June 8, 1959 interrupted the construction of the building, which was later completed in 1960.

The new Harrison Hall was designed to resemble the old building, and is only about 60 percent as large as Old Main, yet it actually has more space for students and for activities. A memorandum by then President John D. Millett on April 3, 1959 discussed the potential distribution of rooms and offices within the new Harrison Hall, also stating which departments would be housed within the building. The official dedication of Harrison Hall occurred on October 8, 1960, which occurred inside one of the three lecture rooms featured within the building. The Chairman of the Board of Trustees, E.W. Nippert, presided over the ceremony, while James H. Maloon represented the State of Ohio. Harrison Hall is 40,000 square feet (3,700 m^{2}) and cost $1,004,000 to build.
