= Lara Spencer =

American television journalist (born 1969)

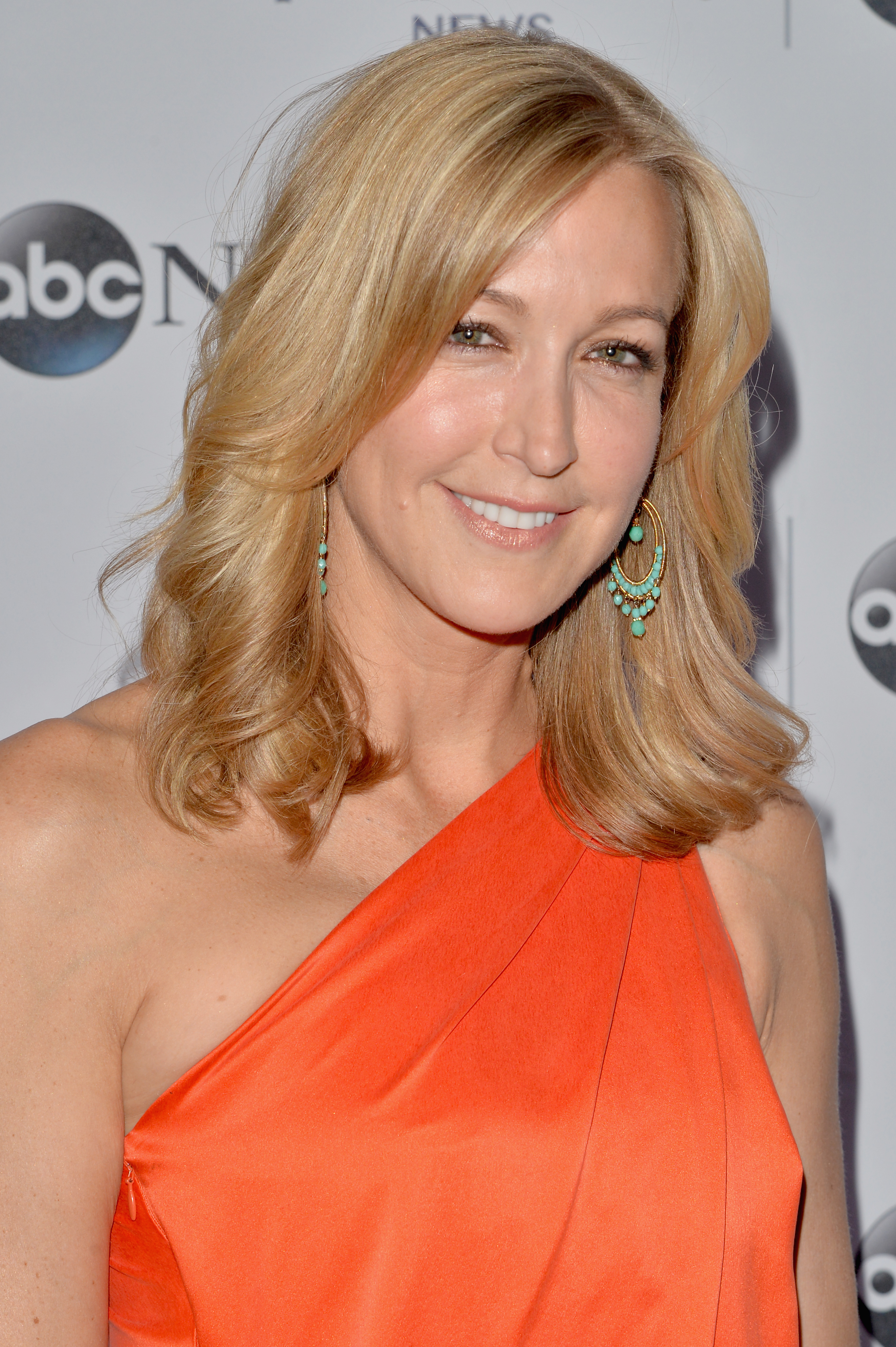
- Spencer in 2014
- Born: Lara Christine Von Seelen; June 19, 1969 (age 57); Garden City, New York, U.S.
- Education: Pennsylvania State University
- Occupations: Television host, television producer
- Spouses: David Haffenreffer (m. 2000; div. 2015) Richard McVey (m. 2018)
- Children: 2

Lara Christine Von Seelen (known professionally as Lara Spencer; born June 19, 1969) is an American television journalist. She is best known for her work on ABC's Good Morning America, previously as co-anchor and currently as contributor. She is also a correspondent for Nightline and ABC News. She was the host of the syndicated entertainment newsmagazine The Insider from 2004 to 2011 and was a regular contributor to CBS's The Early Show.

She was also the national correspondent for Good Morning America and spent several years as a lifestyle reporter for WABC-TV. She hosted Antiques Roadshow on PBS for the 2004 and 2005 seasons and Antiques Roadshow FYI, a spin-off of Antiques Roadshow, during 2005. She hosts the show Flea Market Flip on both HGTV and the Great American Country channel. In April 2018, she announced she would be only appearing on GMA three days a week to focus on her television producing.

== Early life and education ==
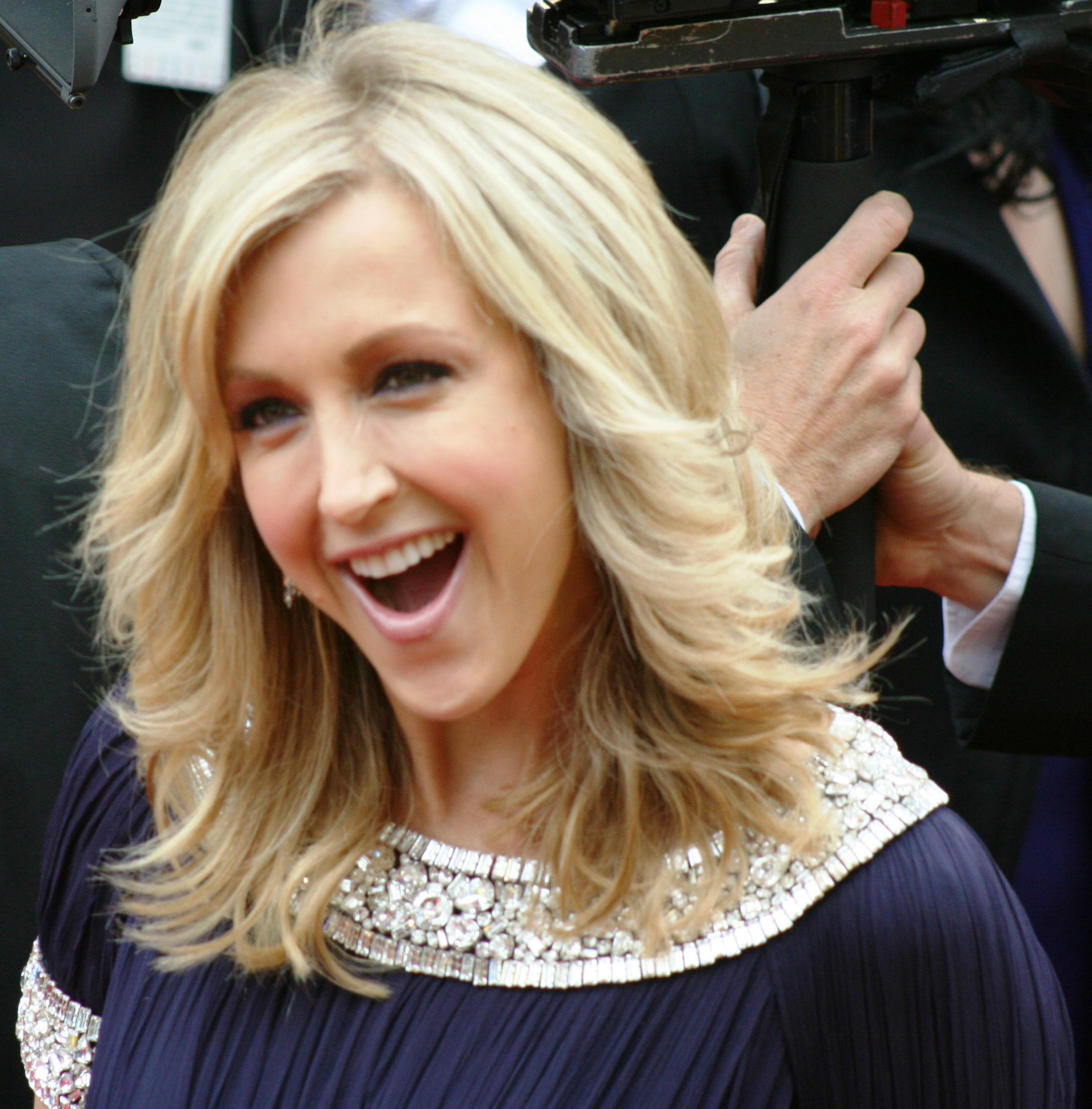
Spencer in 2009

Spencer grew up in Garden City, New York, on Long Island, the daughter of Richard Ernest and Carolyn von Seelen. She graduated from Garden City High School in 1987. She attended Pennsylvania State University on an athletic scholarship for springboard and platform diving and was a nationally ranked competitive diver. She was named an All American Athlete in 1991, her senior year, and graduated with a degree in broadcast journalism.

== Career ==
Following college, Spencer went into the NBC page program, where she would volunteer to work with other reporters in order to gain experience. From there, she landed a position at the CBS affiliate WDEF-TV in Chattanooga, Tennessee as a multimedia journalist shooting and producing her own stories. A year later, she joined News 12 Long Island. Two years later, she began to anchor overnight news updates for WABC-TV. While there, she convened over coverage of the TWA Flight 800 crash, bringing her to the attention of national news executives. She then joined ABC's Good Morning America in 1999 as a national correspondent.

Spencer married former CNNfn journalist David Haffenreffer on September 30, 2000, at St. Andrew's Dune Church in an Episcopal ceremony. They lived in the Riverside section of Greenwich, Connecticut. The couple divorced in June 2015.

In 2014, Spencer was named grand marshal at Penn State's homecoming.

In 2017, she hosted the limited series People Icons.

Spencer announced in January 2018 that she was engaged to New York tech entrepreneur Richard McVey. Spencer first met McVey after a mutual friend set them up on a blind date. He is the founder, chairman and CEO of MarketAxess, a publicly traded financial technology company. On September 1, 2018, Spencer and McVey married in an outdoor ceremony in Vail, Colorado.

In 2018, People announced Spencer’s plans to leave her job as one of the co-anchors on Good Morning America to focus on her production company, DuffKat Media, and work on Good Morning America from behind the scenes in a lesser capacity.

In 2019, Spencer was the guest picker on College GameDay for the Michigan vs. Penn State game.

=== Television producer ===
Spencer was the creator and executive producer of the prime time game show, It's Worth What?, hosted by Cedric the Entertainer, which aired during the summer of 2011 on NBC. She created and produced two television shows based on her passions for interior designing, a one-hour special titled I Brake for Yard Sales that originally aired in April 2012 on HGTV and a flea market-themed series currently airing on Great American Country called Flea Market Flip.

=== Other work ===
Spencer's first book, I Brake for Yard Sales, a guide on how to create high-end looking rooms using secondhand finds, was published and released in April 2012.

She replaced Brooke Burke-Charvet and co-hosted the 87th Miss America pageant at the Boardwalk Hall in Atlantic City, New Jersey with Chris Harrison on September 15, 2013. She and Harrison co-hosted Miss America 2015 on September 14, 2014.

Spencer's second book, titled Flea Market Fabulous: Designing Gorgeous Rooms with Vintage Treasures, a guide on designing rooms and homes, was published and released on September 16, 2014.

== Controversy ==
In August 2019, Spencer's comments about six-year-old Prince George of Cambridge enjoying ballet classes (among other hobbies) were interpreted by some as offensive, causing public backlash. Spencer issued an Instagram apology, saying, "I fully believe we should all be free to pursue our passions" and apologized on Good Morning America during an interview with three professional male dancers.

== See also ==
- New Yorkers in journalism

Media offices
Preceded by Brooke Burke	Miss America co-host with Chris Harrison; 2013–2014	Succeeded by Brooke Burke
