= List of Old Main buildings =

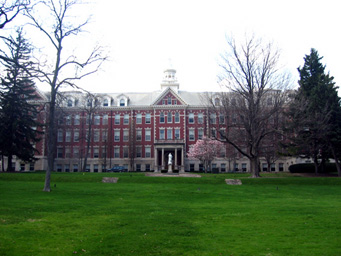
Former Barat College Old Main building, Lake Forest, Illinois.

Old Main is a term often applied to the original building present on college or university campuses in the United States. The building serves today as home to administrative offices, such as the president or provost, but in its early inception may have served multiple functions, including classrooms and residences. Although many university campuses have outgrown the initial capacity of "old mains" and their geography has made them less central to university life than they once were, the building is commonly depicted in university or college marketing material to promote the longevity and tradition of the institution. Many old main buildings are surmounted by large towers, cupolas, or spires, occasionally housing bells or carillons. Some examples of "old mains" (sorted by U.S. state):

== Arizona ==
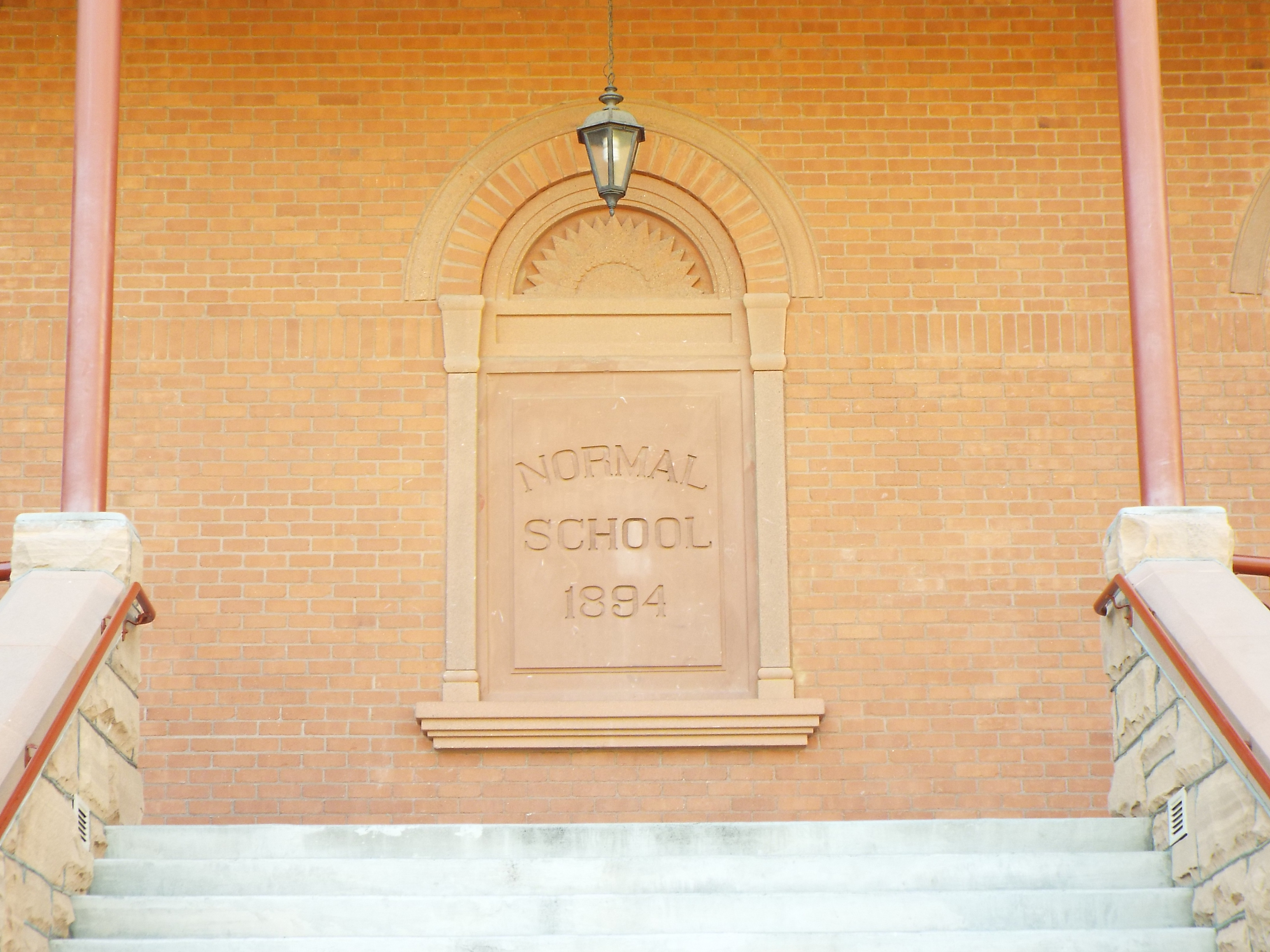
Entrance of "Old Main" on the campus of Arizona State University in Tempe, Arizona.

- Old Main (Arizona State University), the first building on the campus of Arizona State University in Tempe, Arizona
- Old Main, University of Arizona, the first building on the campus of the University of Arizona in Tucson, Arizona

== Arkansas ==
- Old Main (University of Arkansas), the first building on the campus of the University of Arkansas in Fayetteville, Arkansas

== Colorado ==
- Old Main, at the University of Colorado Boulder in Boulder, Colorado

== District of Columbia ==
- Chesapeake and Potomac Telephone Company, Old Main Building, Washington, D.C.
- Old Main, at The George Washington University in Washington, DC

== Georgia ==
- Old Main (Agnes Scott College), at Agnes Scott College in Decatur, Georgia

== Illinois ==
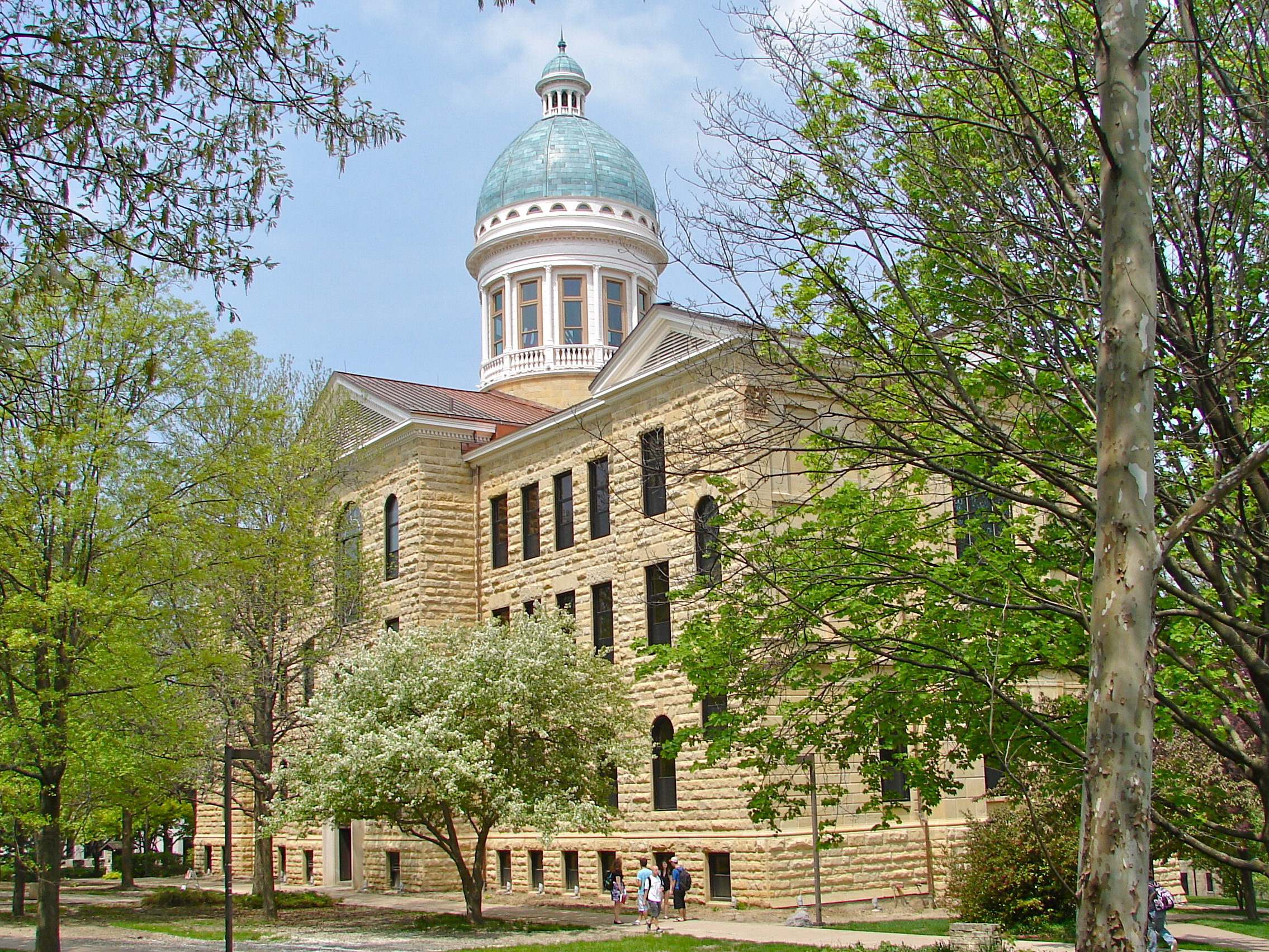
Old Main at Augustana College in Rock Island

- Old Main, Almira College, listed on the National Register of Historic Places listings in Bond County, Illinois, currently part of Greenville College
- Old Main, Augustana College, constructed from 1884 to 1893, listed on the National Register of Historic Places in Illinois
- Old Main (Eastern Illinois University), one of the castle-like structures built on several Illinois universities during and after the administration of Governor John Peter Altgeld
- Old Main at Illinois State University, opened 1860, top story removed ca. 1940, remainder of building demolished in 1958; the bell, dating to 1882, is displayed on the campus quadrangle
- Old Main (Knox College), the only existing site of the 1858 senatorial debates between Abraham Lincoln and Stephen Douglas, in Illinois
- Hauptgebaude, commonly known as Old Main, at Elmhurst University
- Old Main, North Central College, completed in 1870, with a fourth floor in the central part of the building added in 1998
- Old Main (North Park University), built by North Park University in 1894 in North Park, Chicago and listed on the National Register of Historic Places listing in North Side Chicago

== Indiana ==
- Old Main (Franklin College), Franklin College (Indiana), Franklin, Indiana

== Iowa ==
- Old Main (Drake University), administrative building on the campus of Drake University in Des Moines
- Old Main (Grand View University) on the campus of Grand View University in Des Moines, listed on the National Register of Historic Places in Polk County, Iowa.
- Old Main (Iowa Wesleyan University), listed on the National Register of Historic Places in Henry County, Iowa
- Old Main (Wartburg College), listed on the National Register of Historic Places in Bremer County, Iowa

== Maryland ==
- Old Main at Frostburg State University built in 1902

== Michigan ==
- Old Main at Alma College, built in 1886, it was the main administration and academic building for Alma College students until it was destroyed by fire on March 10, 1969.
- Old Main at Central Michigan University, built in 1893, it served as the original administration building of CMU before being destroyed by fire in 1925.
- Old Main, Suomi College, the first building on the campus of Suomi College (now Finlandia University) in Hancock, Michigan. The building is listed on the National Register of Historic Places.
- Old Main (Wayne State University), a historical building on the campus of Wayne State University, which originally housed the Detroit Central High School, in Michigan. The building is listed on the National Register of Historic Places.

== Minnesota ==
- Old Main, Augsburg University built in 1901 and originally known as "New Main"
- Old Main, University of Minnesota, built in 1856 and destroyed by fire in 1904
- Old Main, Hamline University, built in 1884 after a fire destroyed the original University Hall in 1883
- Old Main, Martin Luther College, built in 1884
- Old Main, St. Olaf College, built in 1877
- Old Main, Macalester College, built in 1888
- Old Main, Concordia College (Moorhead, Minnesota), built in 1906
- Old Main, Winona State University, built in 1866-1870, burned down in 1922.

== Mississippi ==
- Old Main (Mississippi State University), historic dormitory on the campus of Mississippi State University destroyed by fire in 1959

== Nebraska ==
- Old Main (Nebraska Wesleyan University), historic building on the campus of Nebraska Wesleyan University, Lincoln, Nebraska

== New York ==
- Old Main (SUNY New Paltz), the first building on the campus of the State University of New York at New Paltz.
- Old Main (Vassar College), a National Historic Landmark building on the campus of Vassar College in Poughkeepsie, New York
- Old Main Mental Asylum, in Utica, New York, now closed

== North Carolina ==
- Old Main, erected in 1923 and the oldest building on the campus of the University of North Carolina at Pembroke in Pembroke, North Carolina. The building is listed on the National Register of Historic Places.

== North Dakota ==
- Old Main (Minot State University), a building on the campus of Minot State University in Minot, North Dakota.
- Old Main (Minot State University-Bottineau), a building on the campus of Minot State University-Bottineau in Bottineau, North Dakota.
- Old Main (North Dakota State College of Science), a building on the campus of North Dakota State College of Science in Wahpeton, North Dakota
- Old Main (North Dakota State University), a historic building on the campus of North Dakota State University in Fargo, North Dakota.

== Ohio ==
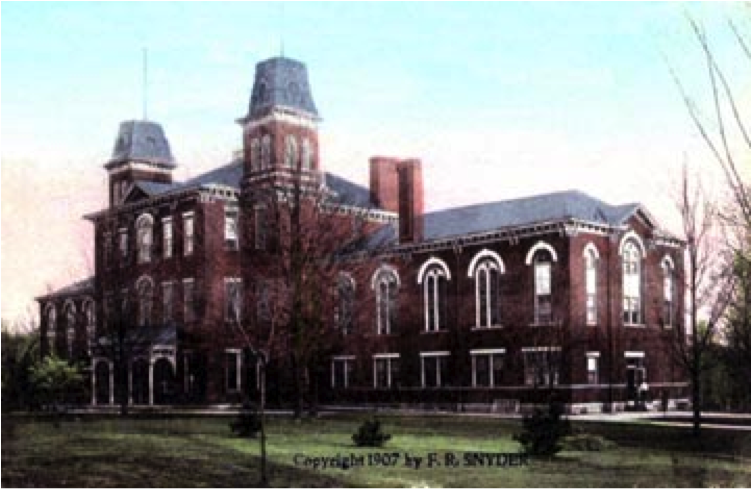
Old Main at Miami University, Oxford, Ohio

- Old Main at Case Western Reserve University building designed by Charles F. Schweinfurth
- Old Main at Miami University stood from 1818 to 1958 and was replaced by the current Harrison Hall (Miami University). Beta Theta Pi and Phi Kappa Tau fraternities were founded in Old Main in 1839 and 1906, respectively.
- Old Main at the University of Findlay, built in 1888 and tower lowered due to stability issues in 1912.

== Pennsylvania ==
- Old Main (IUP) John Sutton Hall, the heart of Indiana University of Pennsylvania's historic area called The Oak Grove and registered in the National Register of Historic Places.
- Old Main (Slippery Rock University), on the campus of Slippery Rock University of Pennsylvania.
- Old Main (Mansfield University), a building on Commonwealth University-Mansfield campus.
- Old Main (Bloomsburg University), a building on the campus of Commonwealth University-Bloomsburg.
- Old Main (Shippensburg University of Pennsylvania), the first building on the campus of Shippensburg University of Pennsylvania
- Old Main (The Kiski School), a building on the campus of The Kiski School, Saltsburg
- Old Main (California University of Pennsylvania), a building on the campus of Pennsylvania Western University, California
- Old Main (Pennsylvania State University), a building on the campus of Pennsylvania State University
- Old Main (Washington & Jefferson College), a building on the campus of Washington & Jefferson College
- Old Main (Geneva College), the first building on the campus of Geneva College in Beaver Falls, Pennsylvania
- Old Main (Widener University), a building on the campus of Widener University, Chester, PA
- Old Main (Franklin & Marshall College), a building on the campus of Franklin & Marshall College
- Old Main (Westminster College), a building on the campus of Westminster College (Pennsylvania)
- Old Main (Kutztown University), a building on the campus of Kutztown University of Pennsylvania
- Old Main (Duquesne University), the first building on the current campus of Duquesne University
- Daniel C. Roberts Hall at Bucknell University, formerly known as Old Main

== South Dakota ==
- Old Main (University of South Dakota), a building on the campus of University of South Dakota

== Texas ==
- Old Main (Baylor University), the first building on the campus of Baylor University after it moved to Waco in 1886
- Old Main (Sam Houston State University), historic building on the campus of Sam Houston State University in Huntsville built in 1889
- Old Main (Texas State University), the first building built on the campus of Texas State University in San Marcos
- Old Main (Texas Woman's University), the first building on the campus of Texas Woman's University in Denton, opened in 1903
- Old Main (The University of Texas at Austin), the first permanent building on the campus of the University of Texas at Austin in Austin

== Utah ==
- Old Main (Southern Utah University), a historic building completed in 1898 on the campus of what is now Southern Utah University in Cedar City, Utah
- Old Main (Utah State University), the original classroom and administration building on the campus of Utah State University in Logan, Utah

== Washington ==
- Old Main (Western Washington University), a building on the campus of Western Washington University in Bellingham.
- Old Main (Pacific Lutheran University), a building on the campus of Pacific Lutheran University in Tacoma, currently serving as a residence hall and known more commonly as Harstad Hall.

== West Virginia ==
- Old Main (Alderson-Broaddus College) (1909), burned in 1978; replaced by "New Main Hall"
- Old Main (Nicholas County High School), listed on the NRHP in West Virginia
- Old Main (Bethany College), a National Historic Landmark building on the Bethany College campus in West Virginia.
- Old Main (Marshall University) the oldest building still standing on the Marshall University campus in Huntington, West Virginia.

== Wisconsin ==
- Old Main (University of Wisconsin Stevens Point)
- Old Main (Lakeland University)

== Wyoming ==
- Old Main (University of Wyoming), the first building built on the campus of University of Wyoming, in Laramie, Wyoming.

== See also ==
- Main Hall (disambiguation), also used similarly for main buildings of universities
- Administration Building (disambiguation), also used similarly
