= Main Hall =

Main Hall may refer to:

in China

- Mahavira Hall, the main hall of traditional Buddhist temples

in Japan

- Main Hall (Japanese Buddhism), of a Buddhist temple
- Honden, the main hall of a shinto Shrine

in the United States

- Main Hall (Raymond, Mississippi), listed on the NRHP in Hinds County, Mississippi
- Main Hall (Springfield, South Dakota), listed on the NRHP in Bon Homme County, South Dakota
- Main Hall, Randolph-Macon Women's College, Lynchburg, Virginia, NRHP-listed
- Main Hall (Lawrence University), Appleton, Wisconsin, NRHP-listed
- Main Hall (De Pere, Wisconsin), listed on the NRHP in Brown County, Wisconsin
- Main Hall/La Crosse State Normal School, La Crosse, Wisconsin, NRHP-listed

== See also ==
- Old Main
