= Flea Market Flip =

- Genre: Reality
- Created by: Lara Spencer
- Presented by: Lara Spencer
- Country of origin: United States
- Original language: English
- No. of seasons: 14

Production
- Running time: 22 minutes

Original release
- Network: HGTV
- Release: September 28, 2012 – 2019

Flea Market Flip is reality television series that aired on HGTV and Great American Country. It premiered on September 28, 2012, and is hosted by Lara Spencer. Spencer, who also serves as executive producer, has written multiple books on the subject of "flipping" furniture.

In October 2012, HGTV renewed Flea Market Flip for a second season with an order of eight episodes. The second season premiered on March 15, 2013.

Flea Market Flip won the "Daytime Emmy Award for Outstanding Lifestyle Program" in 2017 during the 44th Daytime Creative Arts Emmy Awards.

The show went on an indefinite hiatus after 2019 due to the COVID-19 pandemic.

== Summary ==
The show pits two teams against each other in a competition to "flip" used items at a flea market for a later profit. Each team of two is given $500 to buy furniture at a flea market. They are then given $100 to refurbish the items before trying to resell them for a profit at a different flea market. The team that makes the most profit wins $5,000.
