= John Byers Anderson =

US Army officer

- Born: November 22, 1817; Washington County, Pennsylvania
- Died: July 25, 1897 (aged 79); Manhattan, Kansas
- Military career
- Allegiance: United States of America
- Branch: United States Army
- Service years: 1861–64
- Rank: Colonel
- Conflicts: American Civil War

John Byers Anderson (November 22, 1817 – July 7, 1897) (alternatively John Byars Anderson) was an educator, railroad contractor and United States Army officer who served in the American Civil War as a colonel and superintendent of the Union railroads in the Department of the Ohio, Department of the Tennessee and Department of the Cumberland.

== Education work ==
Anderson was born in Washington County, Pennsylvania, on November 22, 1817. He graduated from Washington and Jefferson College in 1836. After graduation, Anderson moved to Kentucky to teach. In 1842 he and his wife opened two separate private schools for boys and girls in New Albany, Indiana, known as the Anderson Collegiate Institute and Anderson's Female Seminary. He operated the schools until 1858. Charles Woodruff Shields and Narcissa Chisholm Owen were graduates of the Institute, and the missionary William Alexander Parsons Martin served as professor of classics for one year at the school.

== Railroad work ==
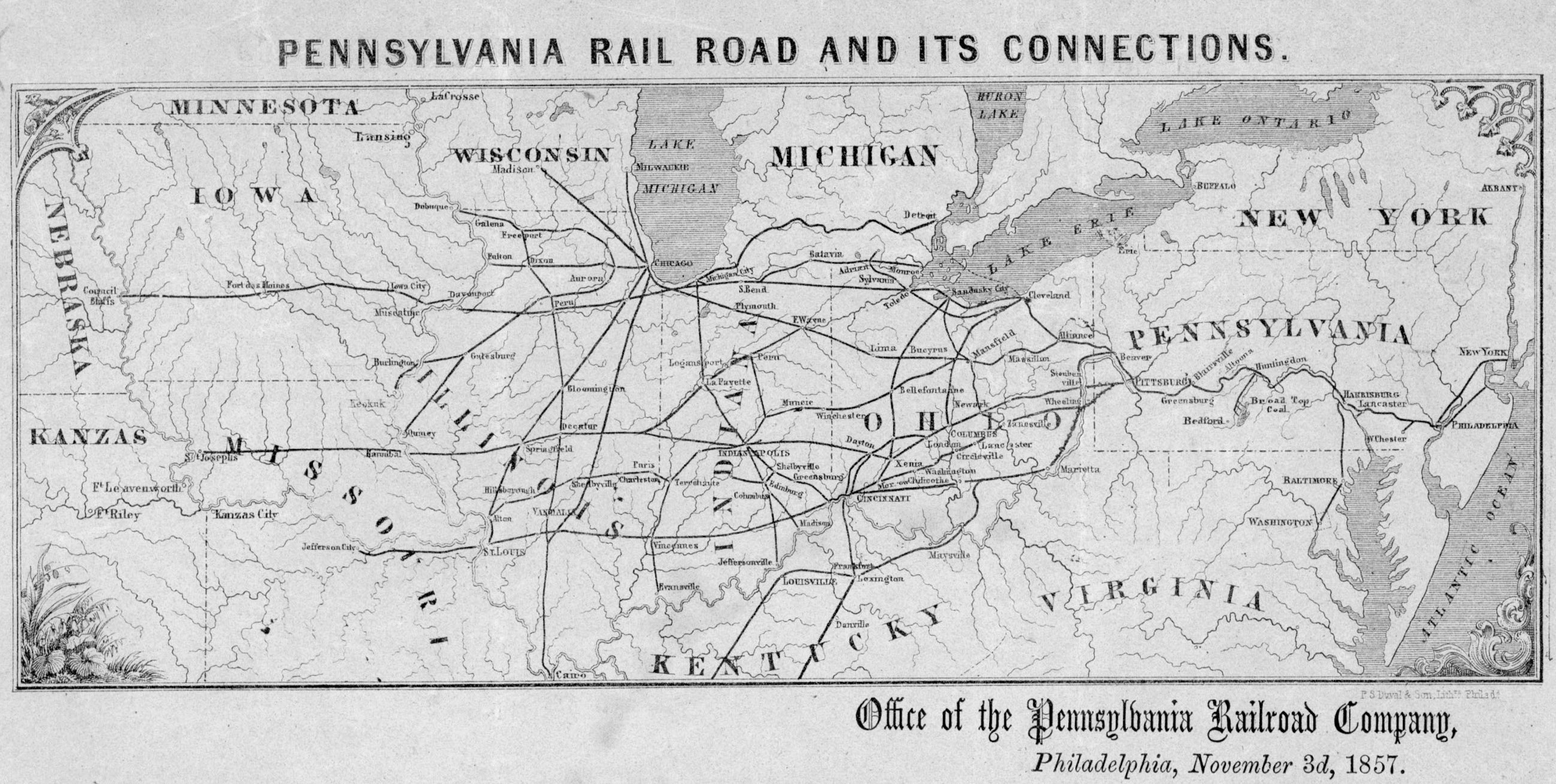
Pennsylvania Railroad map, 1857

In the 1850s, Anderson turned his focus to railroad operations. In 1851, he supervised the construction of a road from New Albany to Corydon, Indiana. In 1852, he was chosen chief engineer of a proposed road from the Ohio River, below the falls to Sandusky, Ohio; and then for three years, ending in 1858, he was General Superintendent of the New Albany and Salem Railroad. During this time, Anderson continued to operate his educational institutions.

As his railroad work took more and more of his time, Anderson gradually withdrew from teaching. After 1858, he devoted himself wholly to railroading.

=== Pennsylvania Railroad ===
In November 1858, Anderson accepted the office of Superintendent for the Middle Division of the Pennsylvania Railroad. In February 1859, he was advanced to the General Superintendency of the Pittsburgh, Fort Wayne and Chicago Railway. In less than a year, however, Anderson was called to be Superintendent of Transportation on the Louisville and Nashville Railroad, a position in which the opening of the American Civil War found him.

=== Civil War ===
During the Civil War, he served in the Union Army as superintendent of various railroads, first as a civilian and later with the rank of colonel. In November 1861, General William Tecumseh Sherman appointed John Anderson as Railroad Director for the Department of the Ohio. In February 1862, Anderson was succeeded in this position by Daniel McCallum, after the creation of the United States Military Railroad. Subsequently, in November 1862, General William Rosecrans appointed Anderson military superintendent of railroads for the Department of the Cumberland. McCallum relieved him of this duty in 1864.

== Postbellum ==
In 1864, Anderson left the Army and became interested in the Union Pacific Railway, Eastern Division, then being planned on a route through Kansas. He apparently never assumed control of the railroad's construction, as urged by the company's president John Perry, but he did become financially involved. In 1868, he and his wife moved to Junction City, Kansas, where his nephew John Alexander Anderson was serving as a preacher. In 1873, his nephew became president of Kansas State Agricultural College in Manhattan, Kansas, and in 1880, John Byers Anderson also moved to Manhattan, where he would remain for the rest of his life. While in Manhattan, Anderson served as president of the First National Bank of Manhattan.

In the 1880s, Anderson also served as president of the board of trustees of the College of Emporia in Emporia, Kansas. In 1888, on the occasion of his 50th wedding anniversary, he established the Anderson Memorial Library at the college through a donation of his book collection.

John Byers Anderson died at Manhattan on July 25, 1897. After his death, in 1908 his large Manhattan home was purchased to serve as the first Catholic school in the town, later called the Sacred Heart Academy. In 1901, Andrew Carnegie donated $30,000 to the College of Emporia in memory of Col. Anderson, who had years earlier allowed Carnegie and other boys to use his library in Pennsylvania, and inspired Carnegie's self-improvement that later inspired him to establish an endowment to build libraries throughout the nation.

== Relatives ==
John Byers Anderson was the second son of the Rev. John Anderson, a missionary and trustee of Washington & Jefferson College from 1806 to 1831. His brother was the Rev. William Caldwell Anderson, president of Miami University from 1849 to 1854.
