= State Architects of Ohio =

Public office in Ohio, USA

The Office of the State Architect and Engineer, also known informally as the State Architect's Office (SAO), was created as an office in the Department or Highways and Public Works by the Administrative Reorganization Act of 1921. The history of Ohio Public Works can be traced to shortly after the state was admitted to the Union in 1803, making it one of the older entities in state government. The manager of this office was generally an Ohio registered architect.

The mission of the State Architect's Office was "to effectively and efficiently lead capital planning, design, and construction of public facilities through quality service, expertise, and knowledge sharing."

== History ==
Public Works was originally a Board formed for the purpose of building and maintaining Ohio's canal transportation system. Created in 1921, the Office of the State Architect and Engineer and the newly formed Department of Highways and Public Works was originally located in the Ohio-Hartman Building, formerly the Hartman Hotel, at 275 South Fourth Street. It was listed as the Division of Public Lands and Buildings in the 1923 Columbus City Directory. In 1927, the Department was split between Highways and Public Works. In 1930, the office was listed as the Division of Architects and Engineers in the Department of Public Works, and in 1933 moved to the new Departments of State Building, now the Ohio Judicial Center, at 65 South Front Street.

In 1974, Public Works was "demoted" to a Division when the departments of Finance, State Personnel, and Public Works were reorganized into the Department of Administrative Services (DAS) and the Office of Budget and Management, and moved to the new State Office Tower, subsequently named for Governor James A. Rhodes, at 30 East Broad Street. It became an office in the General Services Division (GSD) of DAS in 1995, and the office moved to the General Services Center at 4200 Surface Road. After being located downtown since its inception, the office moved to the West side of Columbus just inside the I-270 outerbelt. For a short period of time in the late 1990s, it was known as the Office of Construction Management.

Prior to the establishment of the Office of the State Architect and Engineer, there were fifty-one mutually independent offices, boards, and commissions that comprised the executive department of the state. When necessary, they engaged outside architects and contractors to serve their construction needs on an ad hoc basis. Consolidation of construction authority in one agency allowed for consistency of policy and procedure, as well as standardized contracts and conditions. The Administrative Act of 1921 provided an architectural expert employed by the state, which allowed centralized planning and administration. In 1921, the only agency exempt from central administration was the Adjutant General. Over the years, this authority has eroded significantly, and the institutions of higher education have had varying degrees of interaction with the office.

On April 25, 2012, the Ohio House passed House Bill 487, the Governor's Mid-Biennium Budget Review Bill. On May 16, it was approved by the Senate. House Bill 487 merged the State Architect's Office with the Ohio School Facilities Commission to form the Ohio Facilities Construction Commission.

== See also ==
- AIA Columbus
