= Kristen Erwin Schlotman =

American film producer from Cincinnati, Ohio

Kristen Erwin Schlotman (née Erwin) is an American film producer. She works to bring Hollywood film projects to the Greater Cincinnati area of Ohio.

== Career ==
Schlotman graduated from Walnut Hills High School and Miami University in 1996, with a degree in theater. During high school she was an extra in a Johnny Cash film The Pride of Jesse Hallam that used her school's campus. She began her career at Film Cincinnati in 1997, working as a production assistant, book keeper, intern, producer and location scout before becoming executive director in 2002.

The first major film Schlotman successfully lured to Cincinnati, Ohio was The Ides of March (2011) directed by George Clooney, which was originally slated to be filmed in Michigan. Those films were followed by Todd Haynes's Carol (2015 film) starring Cate Blanchett; Yorgos Lanthimos's Killing of a Sacred Deer (2017) starring Nicole Kidman; and Emilio Estevez's The Public (2018) (for which she was credited as a producer) among others. Schlotman was also involved in choosing the Ohio or Northern Kentucky settings and locations of Marauders (2016) starring Bruce Willis; Netflix's Ted Bundy film Extremely Wicked, Shockingly Evil and Vile (2019) starring Zac Efron; and Luca Guadagnino's 2022 film Bones and All, starring Timothée Chalamet.
