= Bud Haidet =

American athletic director

Bud Haidet is the former athletic director at the University of Wisconsin–Milwaukee, a position he held from 1990 until his retirement in 2009.

Haidet's most significant contribution to Milwaukee athletics was moving the program to NCAA Division I upon his hiring. He oversaw the department as the Panthers men's basketball team made the NCAA Division I men's basketball tournament for the first time in 2003, and two more times, in 2005 and 2006, including a Sweet Sixteen appearance in 2005.
