= Edgar Ewing Brandon =

American academic (1865–1957)

Edgar Ewing Brandon (August 9, 1865 – June 8, 1957) was a professor of French and college administrator who served twice as acting president of Miami University (1909–10 and 1927–28) and was an expert on the Marquis de Lafayette.

Born in York Springs, Pennsylvania, Brandon earned an A.B. degree from the University of Michigan, a A.M. degree from the University of Missouri in 1897 and a Docteur d'Universite degree from the University of Paris in 1904.

Dr. Brandon was appointed professor of Romance Languages at Miami University and held that position until his retirement in 1931. He served as vice president of Miami University from 1908 to 1931, Dean from 1912 to 1931 and was twice acting president. In 1906, he became the first faculty advisor to the organization that would become Phi Kappa Tau fraternity and later served two terms as national president of the fraternity. For his guidance in the development of the fraternity, he is known as the "Architect of Phi Kappa Tau." The fraternity gives the Edgar Ewing Brandon Award to outstanding faculty advisors in the fraternity each year.

During World War I, he served in France as director of the Foyer du Soldat (French YMCA).

In his retirement, he wrote two books on the Marquis de Lafayette chronicling his travels through the United States.

He died in Hamilton, Ohio and is buried in the Oxford (Ohio) Cemetery. Brandon Hall, a dormitory on the Miami University campus is named for Dr. Brandon.
