= Richard McVey =

US business owner

Richard M. McVey
- Born: July 2, 1959 (age 67); Painesville, Ohio, US
- Education: Miami University (BA); Indiana University (MBA)
- Occupations: Chairman and CEO of MarketAxess
- Spouse: Lara Spencer (m. 2018)
- Children: 3

Richard Mitchell McVey (born January 2, 1959) is an American entrepreneur who is chairman and chief executive officer of MarketAxess, which operates an electronic trading platform for corporate bonds and other fixed-income products. McVey has led MarketAxess since he founded the company in April 2000.

== Early life and education ==
McVey grew up in a suburb of Cleveland, where his father ran an oil company and was an active stock investor.

McVey attended Miami University where he received a Bachelor of Arts degree in finance and was a member of the Phi Gamma Delta fraternity, and then received an MBA from the Kelley School of Business at Indiana University in 1983.

== Career ==
In 1991, McVey was hired by JP Morgan, and ran the North America Futures and Options Business, including institutional brokerage, research, operations, finance and compliance. There he rose to become a managing director. In 1995, McVey relocated to New York and moved into fixed income, to run JP Morgan's North American Fixed Income Sales, managing the institutional distribution of fixed-income securities to investors until 2000.

McVey along with Richard Schiffman, founded MarketAxess in April 2000 and is chairman and chief executive officer. He originally proposed the business model for MarketAxess in 1999 as part of J.P. Morgan's Lab Morgan program, which was designed to back executives’ ideas for using web-based technology. He launched the company as an independent venture in 2000, after leading an initial funding round which raised $24 million in capital from JP Morgan and other market participants including Bear Stearns. In November 2004 he led the company's initial public offering.

== Personal life ==
On September 1, 2018, McVey married Lara Spencer, co-anchor for Good Morning America, in Vail, Colorado. They had previously announced their engagement in January 2018. McVey has three daughters from a previous marriage.

In 2020, he donated $20 million to Miami University for the construction of a data science building named after him which opened in February 2024.

In 2024, he donated $10 million to Colby College for the construction of a computational and data science building named after him.
