= Thomas E. Kuenning Jr. =

United States Air Force general

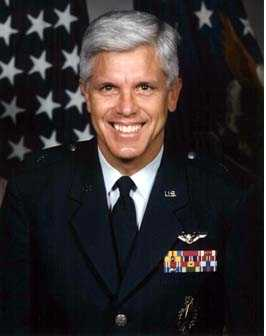
Brig. Gen. Thomas Kuenning

Thomas E. Kuenning Jr. is a retired brigadier general in the United States Air Force.

== Career ==
Kuenning joined the Air Force in 1967 and underwent training at Vandenberg Air Force Base. Later that year, he was assigned to the 341st Strategic Missile Wing at Malmstrom Air Force Base.

In 1973, he returned to Vandenberg Air Force Base and remained there until 1975. The following year, he was assigned to Strategic Air Command. Kuenning was then stationed at The Pentagon from 1979 to 1982, at which time returned to Malmstrom Air Force Base to assume command of the 564th Strategic Missile Squadron. In 1984, he returned to Strategic Air Command.

Kuenning became Vice Commander of the 44th Strategic Missile Wing at Ellsworth Air Force Base in 1987. The following year, he assumed command of the 351st Strategic Missile Wing at Whiteman Air Force Base. In 1990, he was named Commander of the 100th Air Division at Whiteman. He returned once again to Vandenberg Air Force Base the following year. Later that year, he assumed command of the Twentieth Air Force at Vandenberg.

In 1992, Kuenning became an adviser to the North Atlantic Council of NATO in Belgium. Kuenning later became Director of the On-Site Inspection Agency in 1995. He retired in 1997.

Awards he received during his career include the Defense Distinguished Service Medal, the Legion of Merit with oak leaf cluster, the Meritorious Service Medal with four oak leaf clusters and the Air Force Commendation Medal with two oak leaf clusters.

== Education ==
- Miami University
- University of Montana
- Syracuse University
- Squadron Officer School
- Air War College
- Industrial College of the Armed Forces
