= Jeffrey McKee =

Jeffrey Kevin McKee
- Occupations: Biological anthropologist, academic and author

Academic background
- Education: BA., Anthropology; AM., Anthropology; PhD., Anthropology
- Alma mater: Miami University (Ohio); Washington University (St. Louis)

Academic work
- Institutions: The University of the Witwatersrand; The Ohio State University

Jeffrey Kevin McKee is an American biological anthropologist, academic, and author. He is a professor in the Departments of Anthropology and Evolution, Ecology, and Organismal Biology at The Ohio State University.

McKee's publications comprise books and research articles focusing on biological anthropology, paleoanthropology, and paleoecology. He received an Emmy Award in 2016 and is a Fellow of the Ohio Academy of Science and the American Association for the Advancement of Science. Additionally, he has been the Co-editor and Editor-in-Chief of the Ohio Journal of Science.

== Education ==
McKee earned a BA in anthropology from Miami University in 1980, followed by an AM in 1982 and a PhD in 1985 from Washington University, where he also worked as a Computing Consultant and Teaching Assistant.

== Career ==
McKee began his academic career as a senior lecturer in the Department of Anatomy and Human Biology at the University of Witwatersrand Medical School from 1986 to 1996. He joined The Ohio State University in 1996 as an adjunct assistant professor and lecturer in the Department of Anthropology, later becoming a lecturer in the Department of Evolution, Ecology, and Organismal Biology in 1999. He was appointed associate professor in both departments in 2000 and has been serving as professor since 2004.

McKee co-founded and convened the Thomas Henry Huxley Society for Synapomorphic Symposia (1993–1995) and served as a Scientific Consultant for the Taung Heritage Site (1992–1995). He also held leadership roles on the board of directors for Sigma Xi from 2003 to 2010, Ohio Citizens for Science from 2002 to 2006, and the Ohio Academy of Science from 2008 to 2010 and from 2012 to 2017.

McKee has also worked in the field, having conducted archaeological surveys in Ohio in 1979 and 1980, followed by Missouri in 1981. In 1982, he excavated human skeletal material at Mammoth Cave, Kentucky. From 1988 to 1996, he served as Field Director and Co-principal Investigator for excavations at Buxton Limeworks, also known as Taung, in South Africa. He directed excavations at Makapansgat Limeworks from 1993 to 1996, was Co-principal Investigator from 1999 to 2001, and Principal Investigator from 2002 to 2006.

== Works ==
McKee has written four books on the topics of human evolution and biodiversity. He published the 4th and 5th editions of Understanding Human Evolution with Frank E. Poirier and W. Scott Mcgraw (1999 and 2005), providing an overview of paleoanthropology focusing on human evolution through fossil analysis, incorporating the latest discoveries, and addressing key debates in the field. Later, he authored The Riddled Chain: Chance, Coincidence and Chaos in Human Evolution exploring how chance and chaos, rather than natural selection alone, shaped human evolution and could have led to entirely different outcomes. In a review for the Journal of the Royal Anthropological Institute, Goran Strkalj remarked, "Although the subjects McKee discusses are complex and difficult to understand, his easy-going style, rich in interesting and humorous examples and metaphors, makes the book easy to follow for anyone with a grain of intellectual curiosity."

In 2003, McKee published Sparing Nature: The Conflict Between Human Population Growth and Earth's Biodiversity which argued that human population growth drives biodiversity loss, pushing species toward extinction while calling for population control to protect ecosystems. J. Roberts stated that the book "should be mandatory reading for anyone who is concerned about the quality of life on this planet."

== Research ==
McKee's research has spanned paleoanthropology, mammalian paleontology, evolutionary theory, and population genetics, with a focus on paleoecological modeling, mammalian ecology, craniofacial biology, primatology, biodiversity threats, and the intersection of faith and science. Alongside colleagues, he showed that human population growth is linked to increasing numbers of threatened mammal and bird species, predicting a 14% rise by 2050, underscoring the need to control population growth to protect biodiversity. He also analyzed fossil assemblages from southern Africa's Pliocene and Pleistocene epochs to establish a relative chronology, identifying a sequence of sites based on the Faunal Resemblance Index calculated from time-sensitive mammals.

== Awards and honors ==
- 2009 – Fellow, American Association for the Advancement of Science
- 2016 – Emmy Award, National Academy of Television Arts and Sciences
- 2018 – Fellow, Ohio Academy of Science

== Bibliography ==
=== Books ===
- Understanding Human Evolution (4th edition, 1999) ISBN 978-0-13-096152-5
- Understanding Human Evolution (5th edition, 2005) ISBN 978-0-13-111390-9
- The Riddled Chain: Chance, Coincidence and Chaos in Human Evolution (2000) ISBN 978-0-8135-2783-3
- Sparing Nature: The Conflict Between Human Population Growth and Earth’s Biodiversity (2003) ISBN 978-0-8135-3558-6

=== Selected articles ===
- McKee, J. K. (1984). A genetic model of dental reduction through the probable mutation effect. American journal of physical anthropology, 65(3), 231–241.
- McKee, J. K. (1989). Australopithecine anterior pillars: reassessment of the functional morphology and phylogenetic relevance. American Journal of Physical Anthropology, 80(1), 1–9.
- McKee, J. K. (1993). Faunal dating of the Taung hominid fossil deposit. Journal of Human Evolution, 25(5), 363–376.
- McKee, J. K., Thackeray, J. F., & Berger, L. R. (1995). Faunal assemblage seriation of southern African Pliocene and Pleistocene fossil deposits. American Journal of Physical Anthropology, 96(3), 235–250.
- McKee, J. K., Sciulli, P. W., Fooce, C. D., & Waite, T. A. (2004). Forecasting global biodiversity threats associated with human population growth. Biological Conservation, 115(1), 161–164.
- McKee, J. K., & Kuykendall, K. L. (2016). The Dart deposits of the Buxton limeworks, Taung, South Africa, and the context of the Taung Australopithecus fossil. Journal of Vertebrate Paleontology, 36(2), e1054937.
- McKee, J. K. (2017). Correlates and catalysts of hominin evolution in Africa. Theory in Biosciences, 136(3), 123–140.
