= William Caldwell Anderson =

American Presbyterian minister

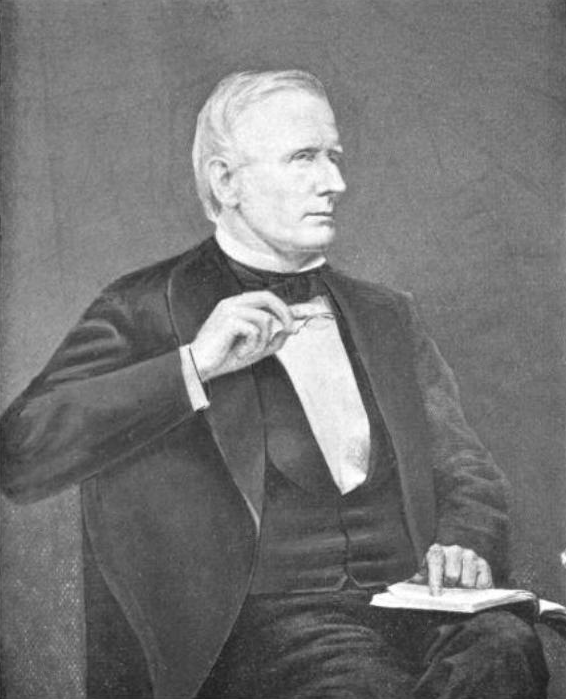

President of Miami University
- In office 1849–1854

Personal details
- Born: August 18, 1804 Washington County, Pennsylvania
- Died: August 28, 1870 (aged 66) Junction City, Kansas
- Resting place: Highland Cemetery, Junction City
- Education: Washington College
- Occupation: Minister, educator

William Caldwell Anderson (August 18, 1804 – August 28, 1870) was an American Presbyterian minister who served as the fourth president of Miami University in Oxford, Ohio.

== Biography ==
He was the oldest son of Rev. John Anderson, and was born in Washington County, Pennsylvania. He graduated in 1824 from Washington College where his father served as chairman of the board and then studied theology under his father. His entire adult life was spent in the ministry with the exception of a short period (1843-1844) when he was professor of rhetoric and belles-lettres at Hanover College, Hanover, Indiana, and later when he was president of Miami University at Oxford, Ohio, from 1849 to 1854. He was a popular president at Miami, following the turbulent and unhappy presidency of Erasmus D. MacMaster.

In 1869 Anderson moved to Kansas and settled in Junction City, where he occasionally preached in the Presbyterian church. Sermons were also delivered in Abilene, Kansas, when that town was at the height of its cattle shipping activities. Anderson died on August 28, 1870, and was buried at Highland Cemetery in Junction City.

Anderson was the father of John Alexander Anderson who was a U.S. Congressman, president of Kansas State University and ambassador to Egypt during the administration of Benjamin Harrison who had been a college roommate of Anderson's at Miami University during the time William C. Anderson was president. Anderson's brother was Civil War officer and railroad executive John Byers Anderson.

Anderson Hall, a dormitory, is named in Anderson's memory at Miami.

Preceded by Erasmus D. MacMaster	President of Miami University; 1849 – 1854	Succeeded by John W. Hall
