= Erasmus D. McMaster =

American Presbyterian pastor, academic and theologian

Erasmus Darwin McMaster
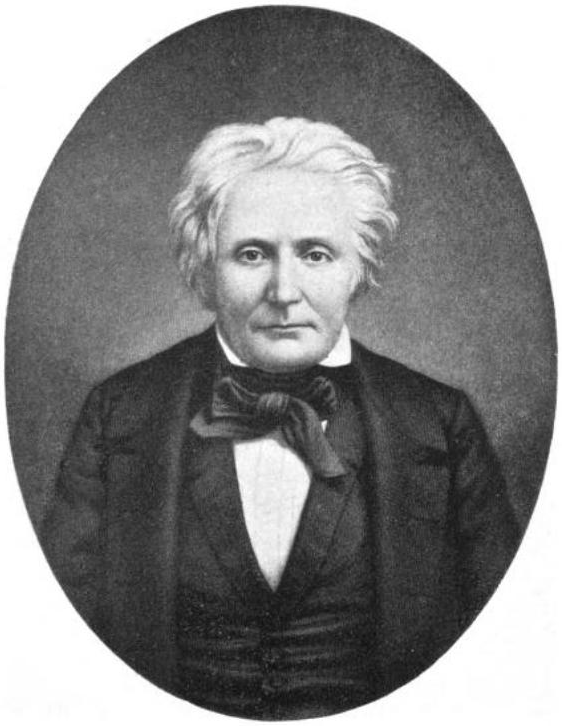
- Born: February 4, 1806; Mercer, Pennsylvania
- Died: December 10, 1866 (aged 60); Chicago, Illinois
- Occupations: Theologian, University President

Erasmus Darwin McMaster, D.D. (February 4, 1806 – December 10, 1866) was a nineteenth-century American Presbyterian pastor, academic and theologian who served as president of Hanover College and Miami University. Along with Henry Ward Beecher, McMaster was one of the most vocal Presbyterian anti-slavery advocates in Indiana.

== Biography ==
=== Early life ===
Erasmus D. McMaster was born on February 4, 1806, in Mercer, Pennsylvania, to Gilbert and Jane (Brown) McMaster. His father was a Reformed Presbyterian minister who immigrated from Ireland in 1791. Young McMaster graduated in 1827 from Union College.

=== Career ===
He was licensed by the Northern Reformed Presbytery in 1829 and preached for one year for congregations with no ministers. After joining the Presbyterian Church (USA) in 1830, he was ordained by its Albany Presbytery in 1831 and installed as the pastor of a congregation in Ballston, New York, from 1831, which he served until 1838, when he became the third president of Hanover College. He presided over the short-lived move of the college to Madison, Indiana, where it was briefly renamed Madison University in 1845. Hanover quickly moved back to Hanover, Indiana, and McMaster left to become the third president of Miami University in Ohio. His Miami presidency lasted from 1845 until 1849 and in 1850 he became a professor of theology at the Theological Seminary in New Albany, Indiana. He was appointed professor of theology at Theological Seminary of the Northwest (now McCormick Theological Seminary) in Chicago, Illinois, in June 1866 and died there in December of that year.

=== Death ===
He died on December 10, 1866, from an attack of pneumonia.

Preceded by George Junkin	President of Miami University; 1845 – 1849	Succeeded by William Caldwell Anderson
