= MarketAxess =

American financial services company

MarketAxess Holdings Inc.
- Type: Public
- Traded as: Nasdaq: MKTX; S&P 600 component
- ISIN: US57060D1081
- Industry: Financial Services
- Founded: 2000; 26 years ago
- Founder: Richard McVey
- Headquarters: 55 Hudson Yards; New York City, U.S.
- Key people: Carlos M. Hernandez (chairman); Chris Concannon (CEO)
- Revenue: ▲US$846 million (2025)
- Operating income: ▲US$341 million (2025)
- Net income: ▼US$246 million (2025)
- Total assets: ▲US$1.934 billion (2025)
- Total equity: ▼US$1.145 billion
- Number of employees: 868 (2025)
- Website: marketaxess.com

MarketAxess Holdings Inc., headquartered in New York City, operates electronic trading platforms used to trade bonds and other fixed income products. It has approximately 2,100 customers, all of which are either institutional investors (91.3% of 2025 volume) or broker-dealers (8.7% of 2025 volume).

The company's platforms allow prospective traders to buy or sell specific bonds and to execute trades using a request for quote system. The company's Open Trading platform allows institutional investors, asset managers, and dealers to all trade anonymously with one another, increasing market liquidity. It also allows for portfolio trading and rules-based, automated algorithmic trading.

In 2025, 86.8% of the company's revenues were derived from commissions for transactions. In 2025, the company received an average commission of $4.28 per $1 million in government bonds traded and an average commission of $138.87 per $1 million of other bonds traded. The company has an estimated 17.0% market share for trading in U.S. corporate bonds, a 5.9% market share for trading in U.S. municipal bonds, and a 2.4% market share for trading in U.S. government bonds.

The company's primary competitor is TradeWeb.

== History ==
Richard McVey originally proposed the model for MarketAxess in 1999 as part of J.P. Morgan & Co.'s "Lab Morgan" program. He launched the company as an independent venture in 2000, with $24 million in capital raised from market participants including Bear Stearns. MarketAxess began trading investment-grade corporate bonds and gave investors access to new issues and research in November 2000.

In March 2001, MarketAxess acquired Trading Edge, which owned BondLink, a start-up bond company that had enabled investors to buy and sell bonds online.

In November 2004, the company became a public company via an initial public offering.

In June 2008, TCV acquired a minority stake in the company for $35 million.

In 2012, it launched its all-to-all trading marketplace, Open Trading.

In February 2013, MarketAxess acquired London-based Trax from Euroclear for $42 million.

In April 2013, MarketAxess announced a partnership to connects its electronic trading platform with BlackRock's Aladdin platform.

In January 2015, MarketAxess and BlackRock extended their Open Trading partnership, already in place in the US, to the European credit markets.

In March 2018, the company announced the extension of its all-to-all Open Trading partnership with BlackRock to Asia, focused mainly on US dollar-denominated corporate and sovereign bonds and other securities traded by market participants in the region.

By 2018, the company accounted for 18% of all U.S. investment-grade bond trading, up from 12% in 2014. Its market share peaked at 22.8% in December 2018, a period of market volatility. However, it began losing market share to TradeWeb.

In August 2019, the company began Treasury trading with the acquisition of the LiquidityEdge platform for $100 million in cash and $50 million in stock.

The company witnessed a surge in trading volumes and its stock price during the COVID-19 pandemic.

In December 2020, the company acquired the Regulatory Reporting Hub, a regulatory reporting business, from Deutsche Börse.

In April 2021, the company acqiured MuniBrokers, a central electronic venue serving municipal bond inter-dealer brokers and dealers.

In April 2022, MarketAxess and MSCI announced a collaboration on fixed income indices, portfolio construction products, and ESG data that would leverage MSCI's ESG data.

In September 2022, the company announced an extension of its partnership with Broadway Technologies for a request-for-quote workflow featuring in its US Treasury trading marketplace.

Effective April 2023, Chris Concannon was promoted to CEO of the company.

In October 2023, the company acquired Pragma, a quantitative trading technology provider specializing in algorithmic and analytical services.

In May 2025, the company acquired a 90% interest in the RFQ-hub platform, a bilateral multi-asset and multi-dealer request for quote platform.

In June 2025, the company launched an electronic trading platform to trade Indian government bonds.

On July 30, 2026 MarketAxess was acquired by Intercontinental Exchange for $5.7 billion.

== Finances ==
MarketAxess revenue and net income in million US$
Year	Revenue	Net income
2025	846	246
2024	817	274
2023	752	259
2022	718	250
2021	698	257
2020	689	300
2019	511	205
2018	435	173
2017	394	147
2016	368	126
2015	303	96
2014	262	75
2013	239	75
2012	191	59
