= United States Secretary of Commerce =

Head of the U.S. Department of Commerce

- Seal of the U.S. Department of Commerce

- Flag of the secretary

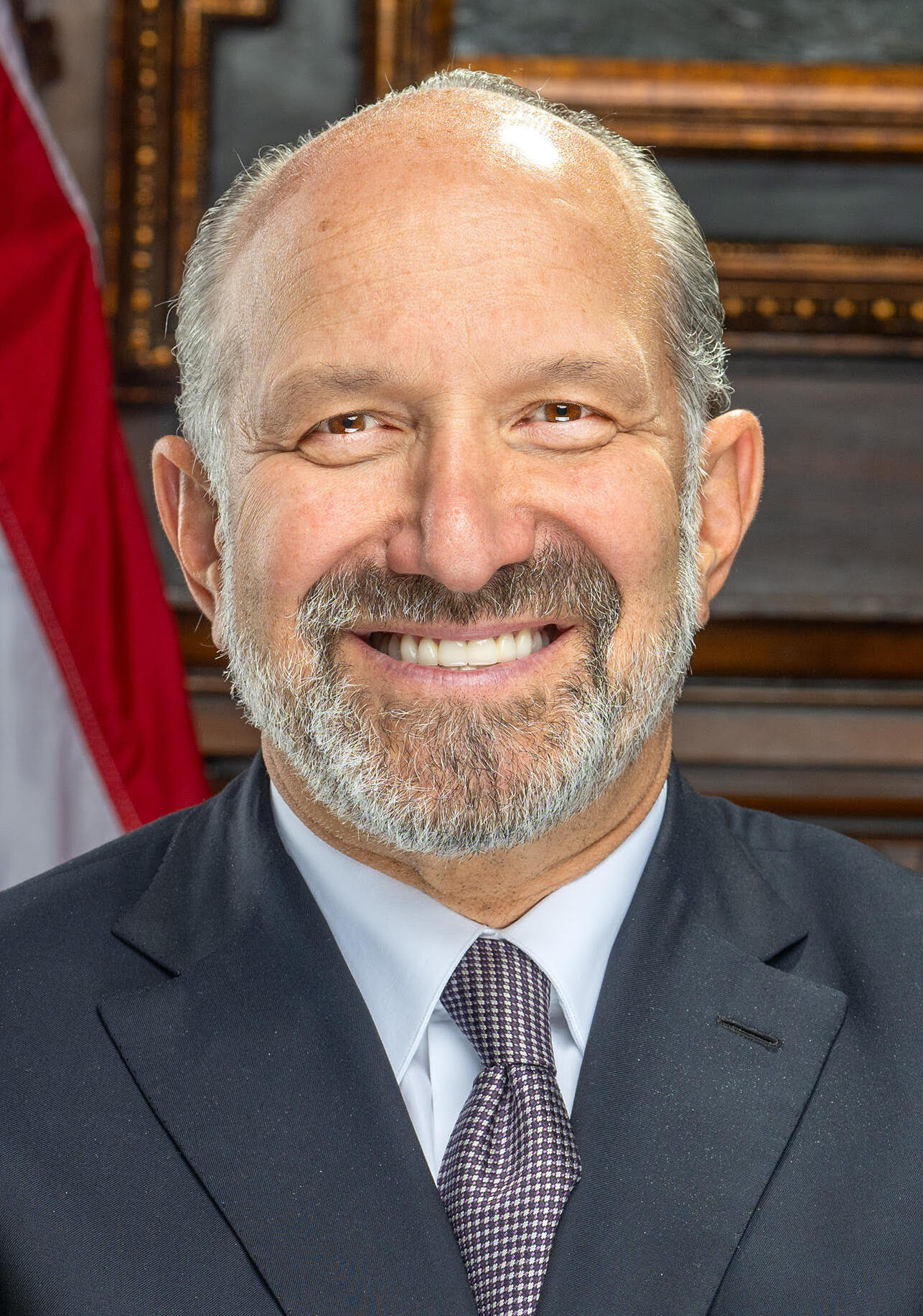
- Incumbent; Howard Lutnick since February 21, 2025
- United States Department of Commerce
- Style: Mr. Secretary (informal); The Honorable (formal)
- Member of: Cabinet
- Reports to: President of the United States
- Seat: Herbert C. Hoover Building, Washington, D.C.
- Appointer: The president; with advice and consent of the Senate
- Term length: No fixed term
- Constituting instrument: 15 U.S.C. § 1501
- Precursor: Secretary of Commerce and Labor
- Formation: March 5, 1913; 113 years ago
- First holder: William C. Redfield
- Succession: Tenth
- Deputy: Deputy Secretary of Commerce
- Salary: Executive Schedule, Level I
- Website: Commerce.gov

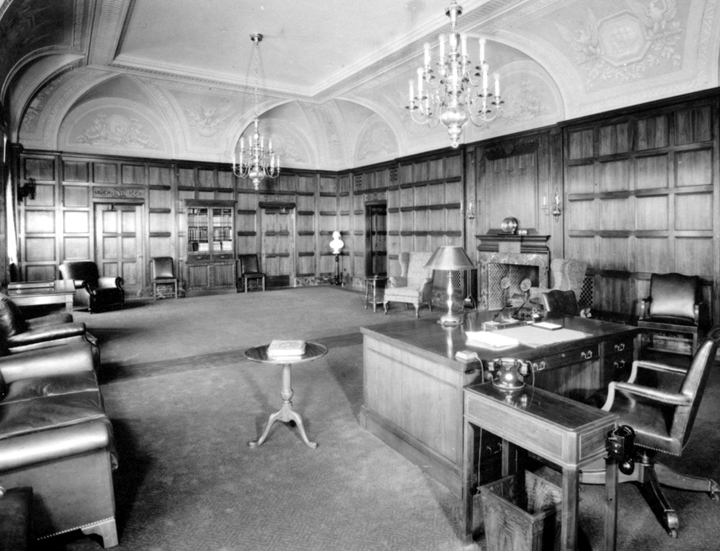
The Commerce Secretary's office as it looked in the mid-20th century.

The United States secretary of commerce (SecCom) is the head of the United States Department of Commerce. The secretary serves as the principal advisor to the president of the United States on all matters relating to commerce. The secretary reports directly to the president and is a statutory member of the Cabinet of the United States. The secretary is appointed by the president, with the advice and consent of the United States Senate. The secretary of commerce is responsible for promoting American businesses and industries, and is one of four cabinet secretaries to oversee a branch of the uniformed services of the United States. The department states its mission as 'to foster, promote, and develop the foreign and domestic commerce of the United States'.

Until 1913, there was one secretary of commerce and labor, uniting this department with the United States Department of Labor, which is now headed by a separate United States secretary of labor.

The secretary of commerce is a Level I position in the Executive Schedule with an annual salary of US$ 250,600, as of January 2025. The current secretary of commerce is Howard Lutnick.

== Duties ==
The secretary is responsible for overseeing a variety of agencies and functions within the U.S. government relating to commerce. Among their principal responsibilities is to oversee the department's child agencies, among which include the Census Bureau, the Patent and Trademark Office, the National Oceanic and Atmospheric Administration, and the National Institute for Standards and Technology.

Additionally, they are one of four cabinet secretaries (alongside Defense, Health, and Homeland Security) to oversee a uniformed service of the United States, the NOAA Commissioned Officer Corps.

== List of U.S. secretaries of commerce ==
Parties

Independent (1) Democratic (21) Republican (19)

Status

Denotes acting commerce secretary

| No. | Portrait | Name | State of residence | Took office | Left office | President(s) |
|---|---|---|---|---|---|---|
| 1 | | William C. Redfield | New York | March 5, 1913 | October 31, 1919 | Woodrow Wilson (1913–1921) |
| 2 | | Joshua W. Alexander | Missouri | December 16, 1919 | March 4, 1921 | Woodrow Wilson (1913–1921) |
| 3 | | Herbert Hoover | California | March 5, 1921 | August 21, 1928 | Warren G. Harding (1921–1923) |
| 3 | | Herbert Hoover | California | March 5, 1921 | August 21, 1928 | Calvin Coolidge (1923-1929) |
| 4 | | William F. Whiting | Massachusetts | August 22, 1928 | March 4, 1929 | Calvin Coolidge (1923-1929) |
| 5 | | Robert P. Lamont | Illinois | March 5, 1929 | August 7, 1932 | Herbert Hoover (1929–1933) |
| 6 | | Roy D. Chapin | Michigan | August 8, 1932 | March 3, 1933 | Herbert Hoover (1929–1933) |
| 7 | | Daniel C. Roper | South Carolina | March 4, 1933 | December 23, 1938 | Franklin D. Roosevelt (1933–1945) |
| 8 | | Harry Hopkins | New York | December 24, 1938 | September 18, 1940 | Franklin D. Roosevelt (1933–1945) |
| 9 | | Jesse H. Jones | Texas | September 19, 1940 | March 1, 1945 | Franklin D. Roosevelt (1933–1945) |
| 10 | | Henry A. Wallace | Iowa | March 2, 1945 | September 20, 1946 | Franklin D. Roosevelt (1933–1945) |
| 10 | | Henry A. Wallace | Iowa | March 2, 1945 | September 20, 1946 | Harry S. Truman (1945–1953) |
| – | | Alfred Schindler; Acting | Missouri | September 20, 1946 | October 7, 1946 | Harry S. Truman (1945–1953) |
| 11 | | W. Averell Harriman | New York | October 7, 1946 | April 22, 1948 | Harry S. Truman (1945–1953) |
| 12 | | Charles W. Sawyer | Ohio | May 6, 1948 | January 20, 1953 | Harry S. Truman (1945–1953) |
| 13 | | Sinclair Weeks | Massachusetts | January 21, 1953 | November 10, 1958 | Dwight D. Eisenhower (1953–1961) |
| - | | Lewis Strauss; Acting | New York | November 13, 1958 | June 30, 1959 | Dwight D. Eisenhower (1953–1961) |
| 14 | | Frederick H. Mueller | Michigan | June 30, 1959 | August 10, 1959 | Dwight D. Eisenhower (1953–1961) |
| 14 | | Frederick H. Mueller | Michigan | August 10, 1959 | January 19, 1961 | Dwight D. Eisenhower (1953–1961) |
| 15 | | Luther H. Hodges | North Carolina | January 21, 1961 | January 15, 1965 | John F. Kennedy (1961–1963) |
| 15 | | Luther H. Hodges | North Carolina | January 21, 1961 | January 15, 1965 | Lyndon B. Johnson (1963–1969) |
| 16 | | John T. Connor | New Jersey | January 18, 1965 | January 31, 1967 | Lyndon B. Johnson (1963–1969) |
| 17 | | Alexander Trowbridge | New York | January 31, 1967 | June 14, 1967 | Lyndon B. Johnson (1963–1969) |
| 17 | | Alexander Trowbridge | New York | June 14, 1967 | March 1, 1968 | Lyndon B. Johnson (1963–1969) |
| 18 | | C. R. Smith | New York | March 6, 1968 | January 19, 1969 | Lyndon B. Johnson (1963–1969) |
| 19 | | Maurice Stans | New York | January 21, 1969 | February 15, 1972 | Richard Nixon (1969–1974) |
| 20 | | Peter G. Peterson | Illinois | February 29, 1972 | February 1, 1973 | Richard Nixon (1969–1974) |
| 21 | | Frederick B. Dent | South Carolina | February 2, 1973 | March 26, 1975 | Richard Nixon (1969–1974) |
| 21 | | Frederick B. Dent | South Carolina | February 2, 1973 | March 26, 1975 | Gerald Ford (1974–1977) |
| 22 | | Rogers Morton | Maryland | May 1, 1975 | February 2, 1976 | Gerald Ford (1974–1977) |
| 23 | | Elliot Richardson | Massachusetts | February 2, 1976 | January 20, 1977 | Gerald Ford (1974–1977) |
| 24 | | Juanita M. Kreps | North Carolina | January 23, 1977 | October 31, 1979 | Jimmy Carter (1977–1981) |
| – | | Luther H. Hodges Jr. Acting | North Carolina | October 31, 1979 | January 9, 1980 | Jimmy Carter (1977–1981) |
| 25 | | Philip Klutznick | Illinois | January 9, 1980 | January 20, 1981 | Jimmy Carter (1977–1981) |
| 26 | | Malcolm Baldrige Jr. | Connecticut | January 20, 1981 | July 25, 1987 | Ronald Reagan (1981–1989) |
| – | | Bud Brown; Acting | Ohio | July 25, 1987 | October 19, 1987 | Ronald Reagan (1981–1989) |
| 27 | | William Verity Jr. | Ohio | October 19, 1987 | January 30, 1989 | Ronald Reagan (1981–1989) |
| 28 | | Robert Mosbacher | Texas | January 31, 1989 | January 15, 1992 | George H. W. Bush (1989–1993) |
| – | | Rockwell A. Schnabel; Acting | California | January 15, 1992 | February 27, 1992 | George H. W. Bush (1989–1993) |
| 29 | | Barbara Franklin | Pennsylvania | February 27, 1992 | January 20, 1993 | George H. W. Bush (1989–1993) |
| 30 | | Ron Brown | New York | January 20, 1993 | April 3, 1996 | Bill Clinton (1993–2001) |
| – | | Mary L. Good; Acting | Texas | April 3, 1996 | April 12, 1996 | Bill Clinton (1993–2001) |
| 31 | | Mickey Kantor | Tennessee | April 12, 1996 | January 21, 1997 | Bill Clinton (1993–2001) |
| 32 | | William M. Daley | Illinois | January 30, 1997 | July 19, 2000 | Bill Clinton (1993–2001) |
| – | | Robert L. Mallett; Acting | Texas | July 19, 2000 | July 21, 2000 | Bill Clinton (1993–2001) |
| 33 | | Norman Mineta | California | July 21, 2000 | January 20, 2001 | Bill Clinton (1993–2001) |
| – | | James F. Taylor; Senior Career Custodian Of The Department’s Administrative And Financial Authorities (Note: Taylor served as Senior Career Custodian Of The Department’s Administrative And Financial Authorities of the United States Department of Commerce in his capacity as Director and Deputy Chief Financial Officer – exercising, by standing delegation, the routine authorities of the vacant Chief Financial Officer and Assistant Secretary for Administration (CFO/ASA) for approximately two hours on January 20, 2001 from the time of the formal resignation of Norman Mineta as United States Secretary of Commerce at noon on January 20, 2001 until the time of the formal swearing-in of Donald Evans as United States Secretary of Commerce in the early afternoon on January 20, 2001 pursuant to United States Department of Commerce Department Organization Order (DOO) 10-5.) | National Capital Region | January 20, 2001 | January 20, 2001 | George W. Bush (2001–2009) |
| 34 | | Donald Evans | Texas | January 20, 2001 | February 7, 2005 | George W. Bush (2001–2009) |
| 35 | | Carlos Gutierrez | Florida | February 7, 2005 | January 20, 2009 | George W. Bush (2001–2009) |
| – | | John Sullivan; Acting (Note: Sullivan served as Acting United States Secretary of Commerce in his capacity as United States Deputy Secretary of Commerce for a few minutes on January 20, 2009 from the time of the formal resignation of Carlos Gutierrez as United States Secretary of Commerce at noon on January 20, 2009 until the time of his own formal resignation a few minutes later with Chief Financial Officer and Assistant Secretary of Commerce for Administration Otto J. Wolff having then assumed office as Acting United States Secretary of Commerce immediately thereafter until Wolff’s formal appointment as Acting United States Secretary of Commerce in the early afternoon on January 20, 2009 pursuant to Executive Order 13242 titled “Providing an Order of Succession Within the Department of Commerce” that was signed by President George W. Bush on December 18, 2001 and the Federal Vacancies Reform Act of 1998.) | Maryland | January 20, 2009 | January 20, 2009 | Barack Obama (2009–2017) |
| – | | Otto J. Wolff; Acting | Virginia | January 20, 2009 | March 26, 2009 | Barack Obama (2009–2017) |
| 36 | | Gary Locke | Washington | March 26, 2009 | August 1, 2011 | Barack Obama (2009–2017) |
| – | | Rebecca Blank; Acting | Minnesota | August 1, 2011 | October 21, 2011 | Barack Obama (2009–2017) |
| 37 | | John Bryson | New York | October 21, 2011 | June 21, 2012; On leave: June 11, 2012 – June 21, 2012 | Barack Obama (2009–2017) |
| – | | Rebecca Blank; Acting | Minnesota | June 11, 2012 | June 1, 2013 | Barack Obama (2009–2017) |
| – | | Cameron Kerry; Acting | Massachusetts | June 1, 2013 | June 26, 2013 | Barack Obama (2009–2017) |
| 38 | | Penny Pritzker | Illinois | June 26, 2013 | January 20, 2017 | Barack Obama (2009–2017) |
| – | | Ellen Herbst; Senior Official Performing the Duties of the Secretary (Note: Herbst served as Senior Official Performing the Duties of the Secretary in her capacity as Chief Financial Officer and Assistant Secretary of Commerce for Administration from the time of the formal resignation of Penny Pritzker as United States Secretary of Commerce at noon on January 20, 2017 until the time of the formal swearing-in of Wilbur Ross as United States Secretary of Commerce on February 28, 2017 pursuant to Executive Order 13613 titled “Providing an Order of Succession Within the Department of Commerce” that was signed by President Barack Obama on May 21, 2012 and the Federal Vacancies Reform Act of 1998.) | Virginia | January 20, 2017 | February 28, 2017 | Donald Trump (2017–2021) |
| 39 | | Wilbur Ross | Florida | February 28, 2017 | January 20, 2021 | Donald Trump (2017–2021) |
| – | | Karen Dunn Kelley; Acting (Note: Kelley served as Acting United States Secretary of Commerce in her capacity as United States Deputy Secretary of Commerce for approximately two hours on January 20, 2021 from the time of the formal resignation of Wilbur Ross as United States Secretary of Commerce at noon on January 20, 2021 until the time of the formal appointment of Deputy Assistant Secretary of Commerce for Administration, Acting Assistant Secretary of Commerce for Administration and Acting Chief Financial Officer Wynn Coggins as Acting United States Secretary of Commerce in the early afternoon on January 20, 2021 pursuant to Executive Order 13613 titled “Providing an Order of Succession Within the Department of Commerce” that was signed by President Barack Obama on May 21, 2012 and the Federal Vacancies Reform Act of 1998.) | Pennsylvania | January 20, 2021 | January 20, 2021 | Joe Biden (2021–2025) |
| – | | Wynn Coggins; Acting | Virginia | January 20, 2021 | March 3, 2021 | Joe Biden (2021–2025) |
| 40 | | Gina Raimondo | Rhode Island | March 3, 2021 | January 20, 2025 | Joe Biden (2021–2025) |
| – | | Don Graves; Acting (Note: Graves served as Acting United States Secretary of Commerce in his capacity as United States Deputy Secretary of Commerce for approximately two hours on January 20, 2025 from the time of the formal resignation of Gina Raimondo as United States Secretary of Commerce at noon on January 20, 2025 until the time of the formal appointment of Deputy Assistant Secretary of Commerce for Administration, Acting Assistant Secretary of Commerce for Administration and Acting Chief Financial Officer Jeremy Pelter as Acting United States Secretary of Commerce in the early afternoon on January 20, 2025 pursuant to Executive Order 13613 titled “Providing an Order of Succession Within the Department of Commerce” that was signed by President Barack Obama on May 21, 2012 and the Federal Vacancies Reform Act of 1998.) | Ohio | January 20, 2025 | January 20, 2025 | Donald Trump (2025–present) |
| – | | Jeremy Pelter; Acting | Maryland | January 20, 2025 | February 21, 2025 | Donald Trump (2025–present) |
| 41 | | Howard Lutnick | New York | February 21, 2025 | Incumbent | Donald Trump (2025–present) |

== Line of succession ==
The line of succession for the secretary of commerce is as follows:

1. Deputy Secretary of Commerce
2. General Counsel of the Department of Commerce
3. Under Secretary of Commerce for International Trade
4. Under Secretary of Commerce for Economic Affairs
5. Under Secretary of Commerce for Standards and Technology
6. Under Secretary of Commerce for Oceans and Atmosphere and Administrator of the National Oceanic and Atmospheric Administration
7. Under Secretary of Commerce for Export Administration
8. Chief Financial Officer of the Department of Commerce and Assistant Secretary of Commerce for Administration
9. Boulder Laboratories Site Manager, National Institute of Standards and Technology

== Notes ==
U.S. order of precedence (ceremonial)
| Preceded by Brooke Rollins as Secretary of Agriculture | Order of precedence of the United States as Secretary of Commerce | Succeeded by Keith Sonderling as Secretary of Labor |
U.S. presidential line of succession
| Preceded by Secretary of Agriculture; Brooke Rollins | 10th in line | Succeeded by Secretary of Labor; Keith Sonderling |
