= John J. Sullivan (diplomat) =

American lawyer and diplomat (born 1959)

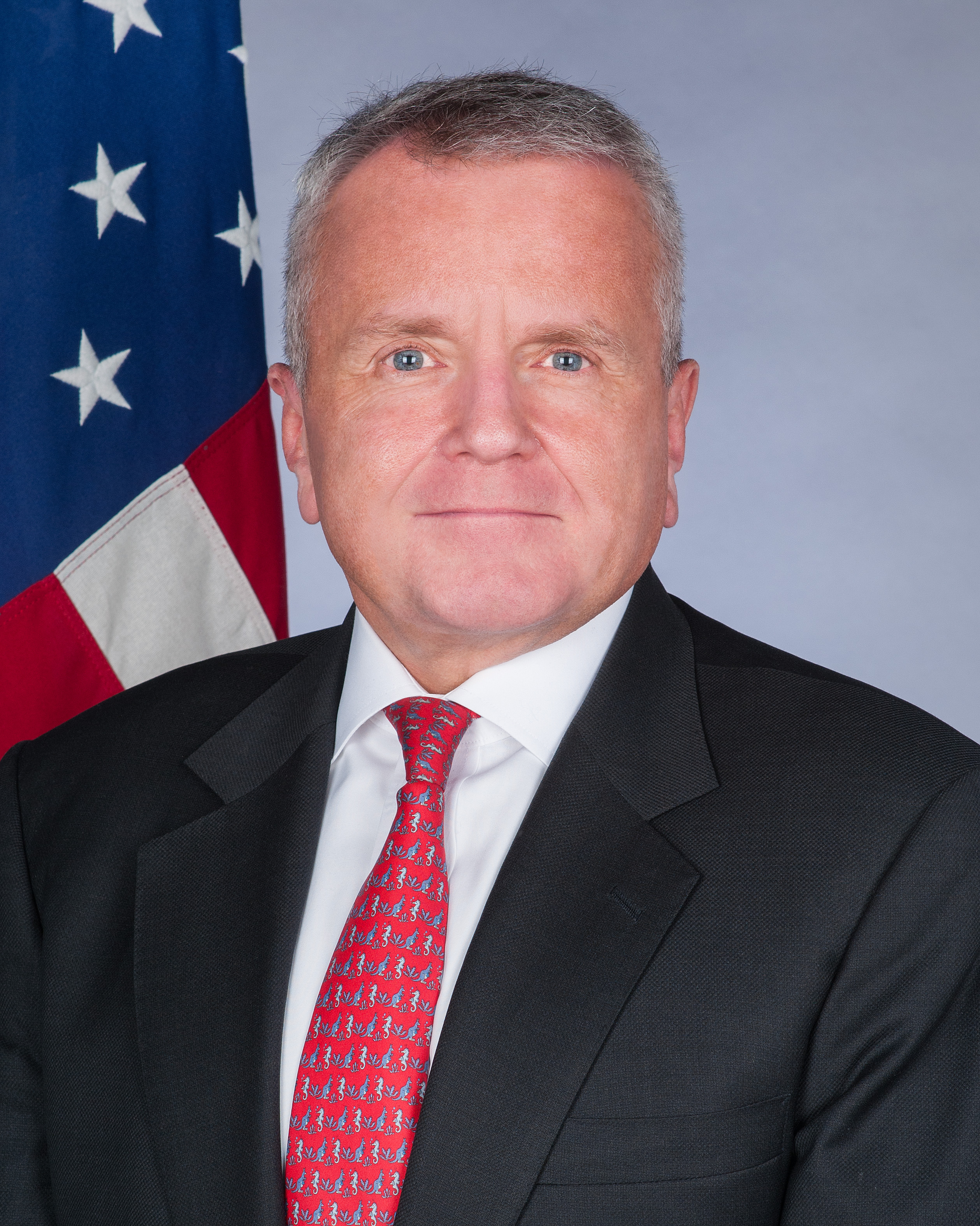
- Official portrait, 2017

10th United States Ambassador to Russia
- In office February 5, 2020 – September 4, 2022
- President: Donald Trump; Joe Biden
- Preceded by: Jon Huntsman Jr.
- Succeeded by: Lynne Tracy

19th United States Deputy Secretary of State
- In office May 24, 2017 – December 20, 2019
- President: Donald Trump
- Preceded by: Antony Blinken
- Succeeded by: Stephen Biegun

Acting United States Secretary of State
- In office April 1, 2018 – April 26, 2018 (Note: Sullivan was delegated all responsibilities from March 13, 2018 until Rex Tillerson's formal departure on March 31, 2018.)
- President: Donald Trump
- Preceded by: Rex Tillerson
- Succeeded by: Mike Pompeo

Acting United States Secretary of Commerce
- In office January 20, 2009 (a few minutes) (Note: Sullivan served as Acting United States Secretary of Commerce in his capacity as United States Deputy Secretary of Commerce for a few minutes on January 20, 2009 from the time of the formal resignation of Carlos Gutierrez as United States Secretary of Commerce at noon on January 20, 2009 until the time of his own formal resignation a few minutes later with Chief Financial Officer and Assistant Secretary of Commerce for Administration Otto J. Wolff having then assumed office as Acting United States Secretary of Commerce immediately thereafter until Wolff’s formal appointment as Acting United States Secretary of Commerce in the early afternoon on January 20, 2009 pursuant to Executive Order 13242 titled “Providing an Order of Succession Within the Department of Commerce” that was signed by President George W. Bush on December 18, 2001 and the Federal Vacancies Reform Act of 1998.)
- President: Barack Obama
- Preceded by: Carlos Gutierrez
- Succeeded by: Otto J. Wolff (acting)

13th United States Deputy Secretary of Commerce
- In office March 14, 2008 – January 20, 2009; Acting: September 1, 2007 – March 14, 2008
- President: George W. Bush
- Preceded by: David A. Sampson
- Succeeded by: Dennis Hightower

General Counsel of the United States Department of Commerce
- In office July 22, 2005 – March 14, 2008
- President: George W. Bush
- Preceded by: Theodore Kassinger
- Succeeded by: Lily Fu Claffee

Personal details
- Born: John Joseph Sullivan; November 20, 1959 (age 66) Boston, Massachusetts, U.S.
- Party: Republican
- Spouse: Grace Rodriguez (deceased)
- Children: 3
- Education: Brown University (BA); Columbia University (JD)

John Joseph Sullivan (born November 20, 1959) is an American attorney and government official who served as the United States ambassador to Russia from 2020 to 2022, and who previously served as the 19th U.S. deputy secretary of state from 2017 to 2019. A member of the Republican Party, Sullivan served as Acting United States Secretary of State from April 1, 2018, to April 26, 2018, following President Donald Trump's dismissal of Secretary of State Rex Tillerson on March 13, 2018, until Tillerson's official successor, Mike Pompeo, was sworn in. Tillerson did not officially leave office until March 31, 2018. Sullivan, however, was delegated all responsibilities of the Secretary of State beginning March 13.

On October 11, 2019, President Trump nominated Sullivan to be the United States Ambassador to Russia. On December 12, 2019, the United States Senate confirmed his nomination by a 70–22 vote.

Sullivan remained Ambassador to Russia during the presidential transition of Joe Biden. On September 4, 2022, Sullivan left Moscow and stated he would retire. The U.S. deputy chief of mission in Russia, Elizabeth Rood, replaced Sullivan as the top U.S. diplomat in Moscow until a permanent successor was named. The White House on September 20 announced the nomination of Lynne Tracy, former U.S. ambassador to Armenia, to the post.

== Early life and education ==
Sullivan was born in Boston on November 20, 1959. He was raised in Medfield, Massachusetts, and graduated from Xaverian Brothers High School in 1977. He then received a Bachelor of Arts in history and political science from Brown University in 1981 and a Juris Doctor from Columbia Law School in 1985. At Columbia, he was a Harlan Fiske Stone Scholar and Book Reviews Editor of the Columbia Law Review. He was a law clerk for Judge John Minor Wisdom of the United States Court of Appeals for the Fifth Circuit and for United States Supreme Court Justice David H. Souter during the 1990 Term.

== Career ==
In 1991, Sullivan served as Counselor to Assistant Attorney General J. Michael Luttig in the Office of Legal Counsel of the United States Department of Justice. The next year, he served as Deputy General Counsel of President George H. W. Bush's 1992 re-election campaign.

In 1993, Sullivan joined the Washington, D.C. law firm of Mayer, Brown, Rowe & Maw LLP, where he practiced Supreme Court law. He was a partner in Mayer Brown's Washington, D.C. office and "co-chair of the firm's National Security practice". His firm biography read:

He also has served as a senior adviser to four presidential campaigns. ... [Sullivan] has focused his practice on the growing intersection of global trade and investment and U.S. national security and foreign policies. He advises CEOs, general counsels, and other senior executives on U.S. sanctions and export controls, international trade disputes and regulation, and foreign investment in the United States, the Middle East, Russia, and other countries. His clients include major oil and gas companies, consulting, accounting, and financial services firms, petrochemical companies, and manufacturers. He has represented these clients before executive departments and agencies of the U.S. and foreign governments, as well as in litigation in the United States, where he has filed briefs and presented oral argument in courts across the country.

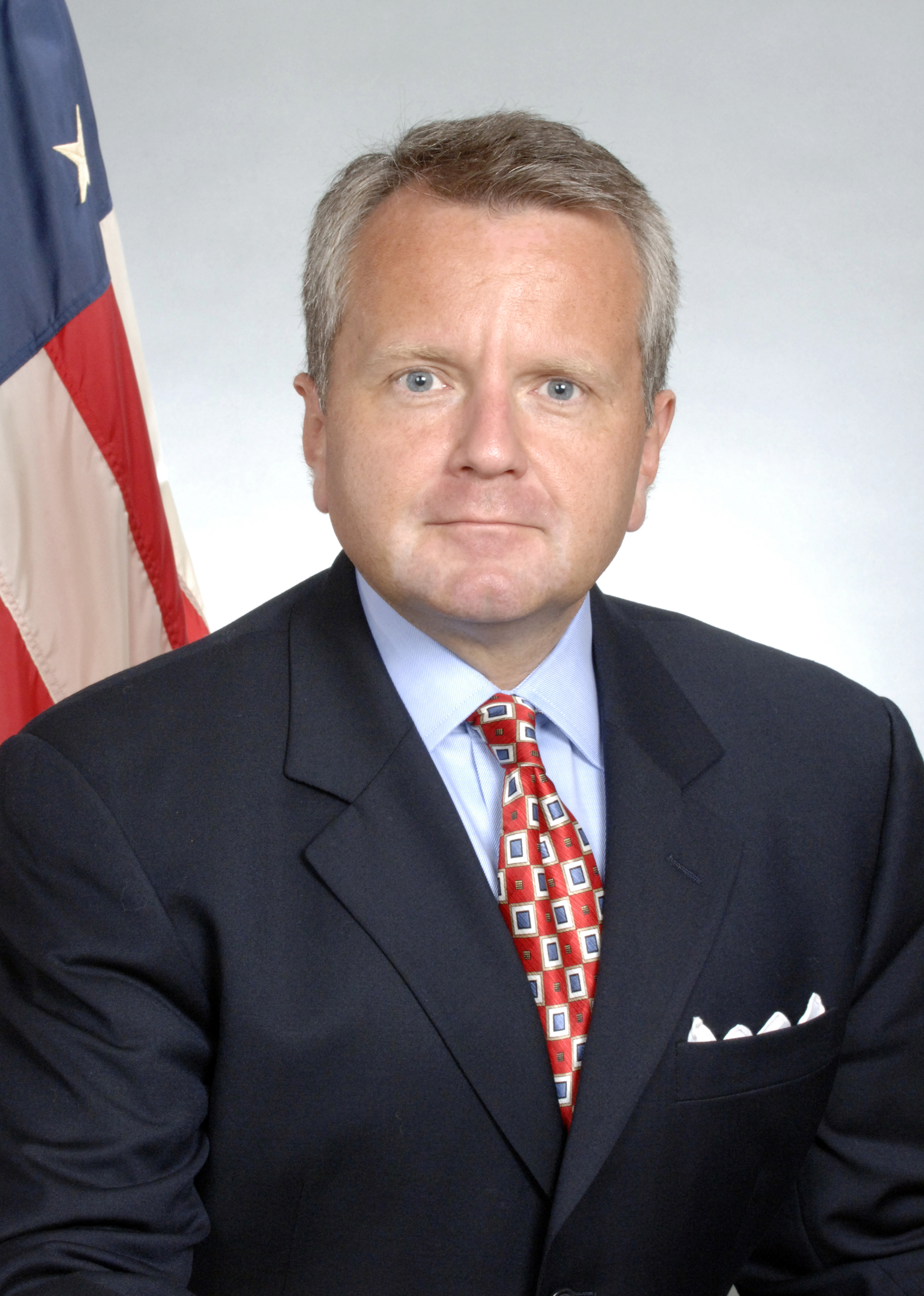
Sullivan's earlier government portrait as General Counsel at the United States Department of Commerce

The biography also discussed work on client business in Russia, Iran, Cuba and Iraq and "advising a multinational manufacturing company on security policies and risk issues in countries with a high threat of terrorism, violence, and political instability". In the Obama administration, Sullivan was chairman of the U.S.–Iraq Business Dialogue, "an advisory committee on economic relations between the two countries".

In February 2004, U.S. Secretary of Defense Donald Rumsfeld appointed Sullivan as Deputy General Counsel of the United States Department of Defense. In this capacity, he was responsible for all litigation involving the department and for counsel on major criminal and congressional investigations. During his tenure, he was awarded the Secretary of Defense's Medal for Exceptional Public Service.

Sullivan then moved to the U.S. Department of Commerce, where he served as General Counsel. As the department's chief legal officer and Designated Agency Ethics Official, Sullivan managed the work of over 400 lawyers in the 14 legal offices providing legal advice to all components of the department.

Upon the resignation of Deputy Secretary of Commerce David Sampson, Sullivan was assigned as Acting Deputy Secretary of Commerce beginning on September 1, 2007. He was soon thereafter nominated by George W. Bush to serve in a permanent capacity and was sworn in on March 14, 2008, after confirmation by the United States Senate. As the department's chief operating officer, he managed a $6.8 billion budget and 38,000 employees in 13 operating units. He was also a member of President Bush's Management Council and a member of the board of directors of the Overseas Private Investment Corporation.

== Deputy Secretary of State ==
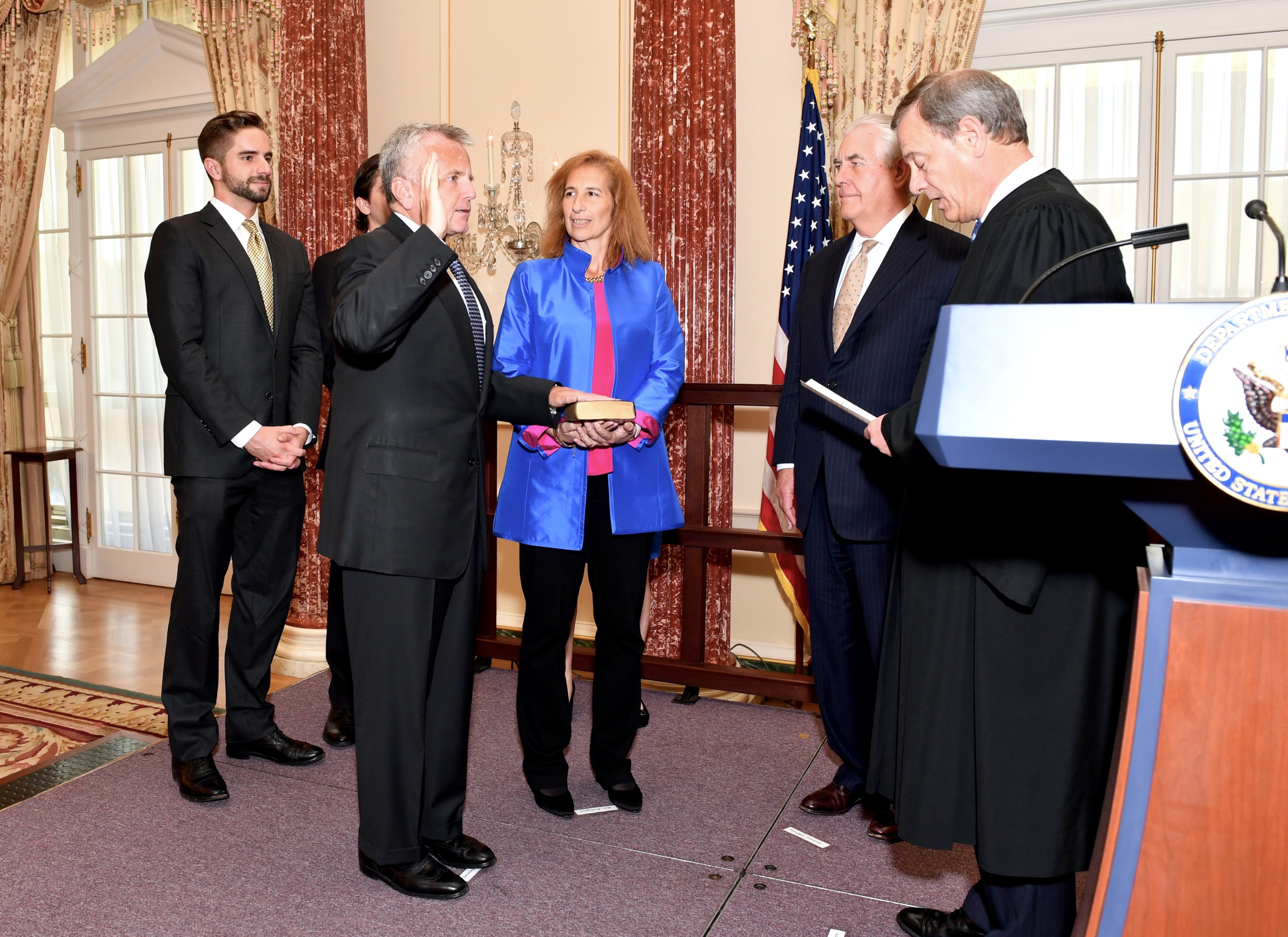
Sullivan being sworn in as Deputy Secretary of State by Chief Justice John Roberts.

President Donald Trump nominated Sullivan to serve as the United States Deputy Secretary of State on April 11, 2017. He was confirmed as U.S. Deputy Secretary of State by the Senate on May 24, 2017, with a vote of 94–6.

In 2019, U.S. House of Representative members leading the impeachment inquiry against President Donald Trump reported that the State Department had refused to turn over documents directly relevant to that investigation, including those related to President Trump's request that Ukraine initiate political investigations. In a letter to Deputy Secretary Sullivan, House officials wrote that they considered "the refusal to comply with a duly authorized congressional subpoena as obstruction of the lawful functions of Congress and of the impeachment inquiry."

== United States Ambassador to Russia ==
On October 11, 2019, President Trump nominated Sullivan to be the United States Ambassador to Russia. On December 12, 2019, the United States Senate confirmed his nomination by a 70–22 vote.

As a lifelong hockey fan, Sullivan sought to utilize his passion and knowledge of the sport as a diplomatic tool to engage with Russians during his ambassadorship. He dropped the puck at the Moscow derby between Dynamo Moscow and Spartak Moscow on February 1, 2020, while describing Alexander Ovechkin as his favorite player.

After the departure of President Trump in January 2021, incoming President Joe Biden asked Sullivan, along with a small cadre of Trump-appointed ambassadors, to stay on during his term and not tender a resignation, as is custom during a transition. While it was initially reported that this request was presumed to precipitate the careful selection of a new ambassador, the Biden administration did not rule out asking Sullivan to stay on indefinitely. In April 2021, it was reported that Sullivan will remain in that role "for the foreseeable future". However, Sullivan left the post in September 2022, by which point his departure was described as "expected", but expedited by what the Associated Press said was a "family medical issue". On September 5, 2022, Sullivan stated that his wife had died from cancer, and that was the reason for his return to the U.S.

=== 2021 American-Russian diplomatic crisis ===
In April 2021, after President Biden announced a new package of sanctions against Russia, Sullivan was summoned to a joint meeting between Vladimir Putin's North America adviser Yuri Ushakov and Foreign Minister Sergei Lavrov. At the meeting, the Russian side formally requested that Sullivan go under ambassadorial recall, just as Russian Ambassador to the United States Anatoly Antonov had done weeks earlier. The request was not addressed by Sullivan (diplomatic conventions do not provide for binding recall requests without declaring the diplomat persona non grata). Nevertheless, Sullivan departed Moscow at the end of the month, after pressure continued to be exerted for Sullivan to leave. While the cited reason for Sullivan's return was to see his family and engage in consultations with the incoming administration, experts posited that Sullivan may have been threatened with a declaration of persona non grata. Following a June 2021 meeting between the countries' presidents, he returned to Russia.

== Personal life ==
Sullivan and his late wife, Grace Rodriguez, have three children (Jack, Katie and Teddy) and live in Maryland. He is the nephew of former United States Ambassador to Iran William H. Sullivan, whom John called the "real Ambassador Sullivan". Sullivan is Catholic.

== Books ==
- Sullivan, John J.; James N. Mattis (August 6, 2024). Midnight in Moscow: A Memoir from the Front Lines of Russia's War Against the West. New York: Little, Brown, and Company. ISBN 9780316571098. OCLC 1396553167.

== See also ==
- List of law clerks for the third seat of the Supreme Court of the United States

== Notes ==
Legal offices
Preceded by Theodore Kassinger	General Counsel of the United States Department of Commerce; 2005–2008	Succeeded by Lily Fu Claffee
Political offices
Preceded by David Sampson	United States Deputy Secretary of Commerce; 2008–2009	Succeeded by Dennis Hightower
Preceded by David Sampson	United States Deputy Secretary of Commerce; 2008–2009	Succeeded by Dennis Hightower
Preceded by Carlos Gutierrez	United States Secretary of Commerce; Acting; 2009	Succeeded by Otto J. Wolff; Acting
Preceded by Tony Blinken	United States Deputy Secretary of State; 2017–2019	Succeeded by Stephen Biegun
Preceded by Rex Tillerson	United States Secretary of State; Acting; 2018	Succeeded by Mike Pompeo
Diplomatic posts
Preceded by Jon Huntsman Jr.	United States Ambassador to Russia; 2020–2022	Succeeded by Elizabeth Rood as Chargée d'affaires
