= Wynn Coggins =

American civil servant

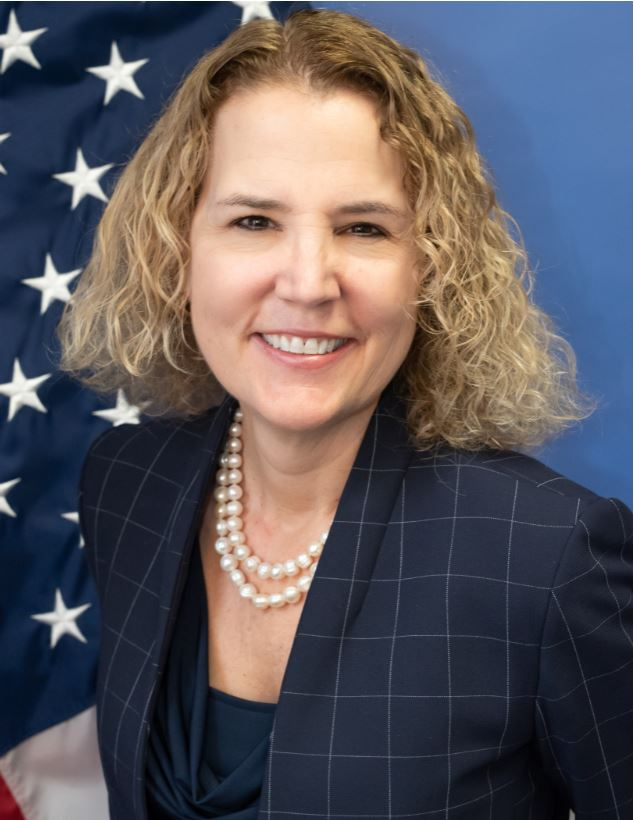

United States Deputy Secretary of Commerce
- Acting
- In office March 3, 2021 – May 14, 2021
- President: Joe Biden
- Preceded by: Karen Dunn Kelley
- Succeeded by: Don Graves

United States Secretary of Commerce
- Acting
- In office January 20, 2021 – March 3, 2021
- President: Joe Biden
- Preceded by: Karen Dunn Kelley (acting)
- Succeeded by: Gina Raimondo

Personal details
- Spouse: Wallace Coggins
- Children: 2
- Education: Clemson University (BS); George Washington University (MS)

Wynn Coggins is an American business executive and former civil servant who was acting U.S. secretary of commerce from January to March 2021, and acting U.S. deputy secretary of commerce from March to May 2021.

== Education ==
Coggins has a bachelor's degree in civil engineering from Clemson University and a Master of Science in information systems technology with a concentration in information resources management from the George Washington University School of Business.

== Career ==
=== United States Department of Commerce ===
Coggins held several senior leadership roles at the United States Department of Commerce, including Acting United States Secretary of Commerce, Acting United States Deputy Secretary of Commerce, Acting Assistant Secretary of Commerce for Administration and Deputy Assistant Secretary of Commerce for Administration. She served as Acting Secretary of Commerce from January 20, 2021, until March 3, 2021, when Gina Raimondo was sworn in. Coggins then served as Acting United States Deputy Secretary of Commerce from March 3, 2021, until May 14, 2021, when her successor, Don Graves, was sworn in. She served as the Acting Assistant Secretary of Commerce for Administration from May 2021 until her retirement from federal service in February 2022.

Acting Secretary of Commerce

On January 20, 2021, following the inauguration of President Joe Biden, Coggins was selected to serve as acting United States Secretary of Commerce, pending the confirmation of nominee Gina Raimondo by the United States Senate.

Acting Deputy Secretary of Commerce

On March 3, 2021, Coggins began to serve as acting United States Deputy Secretary of Commerce.

=== Deloitte Consulting ===
Director of Government Modernization

Coggins served as a Specialist Executive within the Deloitte Government and Public Services practice starting in February 2022 and became the Director Of Government Modernization in May 2025, serving in that role until December 2025.

=== Management Science and Innovation Consulting ===
Chief Growth Officer

On January 7, 2026, Coggins became the Chief Growth Officer at Management Science and Innovation.

Political offices
Preceded by Karen Dunn Kelley; Acting	United States Secretary of Commerce; Acting; 2021	Succeeded by Gina Raimondo
Preceded by Karen Dunn Kelley	United States Deputy Secretary of Commerce; Acting; 2021	Succeeded by Don Graves
