= Karen Dunn Kelley =

American government official

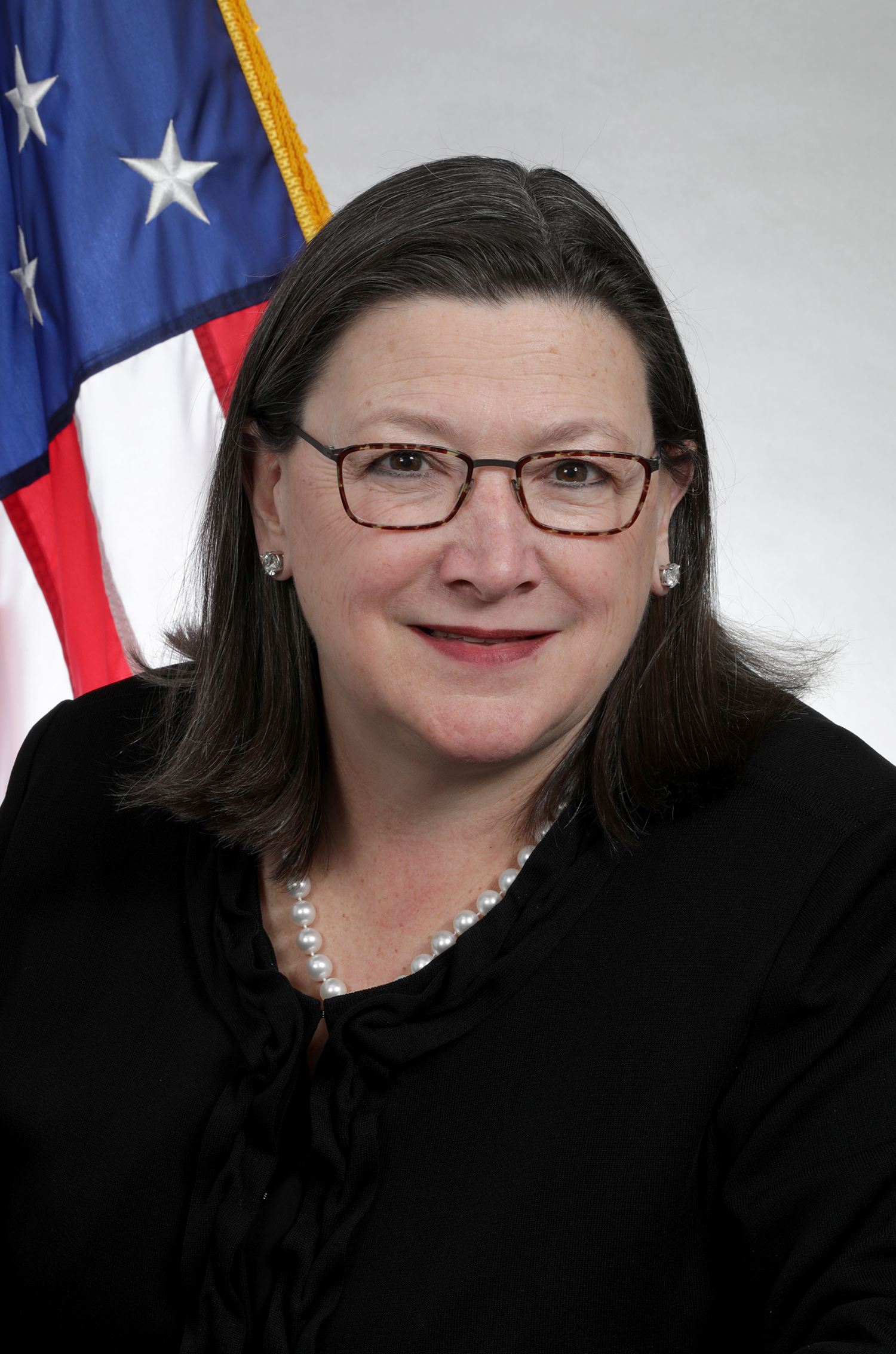
- Official portrait, 2019

Acting United States Secretary of Commerce
- In office January 20, 2021 (Note: (approximately two hours)) (Note: Kelley served as Acting United States Secretary of Commerce in her capacity as United States Deputy Secretary of Commerce for approximately two hours on January 20, 2021 from the time of the formal resignation of Wilbur Ross as United States Secretary of Commerce at noon on January 20, 2021 until the time of the formal appointment of Deputy Assistant Secretary of Commerce for Administration, Acting Assistant Secretary of Commerce for Administration and Acting Chief Financial Officer Wynn Coggins as Acting United States Secretary of Commerce in the early afternoon on January 20, 2021 pursuant to Executive Order 13613 titled “Providing an Order of Succession Within the Department of Commerce” that was signed by President Barack Obama on May 21, 2012 and the Federal Vacancies Reform Act of 1998.)
- President: Joe Biden
- Preceded by: Wilbur Ross
- Succeeded by: Wynn Coggins (acting)

17th United States Deputy Secretary of Commerce
- In office November 28, 2018 – January 20, 2021 (Note: Acting: September 22, 2017 – November 28, 2018)
- President: Donald Trump
- Preceded by: Bruce H. Andrews
- Succeeded by: Don Graves

Under Secretary of Commerce for Economic Affairs
- In office September 22, 2017 – November 28, 2018
- President: Donald Trump
- Preceded by: Mark Doms
- Succeeded by: Jed Kolko

Personal details
- Spouse: Joseph L. Kelley
- Children: 3
- Education: Villanova University (BS)

Karen Dunn Kelley is an American financial investment manager and government official who served as United States Deputy Secretary of Commerce from 2018 to 2021.

Kelley also served as Acting United States Secretary of Commerce in her capacity as United States Deputy Secretary of Commerce for approximately two hours on January 20, 2021 from the time of the formal resignation of Wilbur Ross as United States Secretary of Commerce at noon on January 20, 2021 until the time of the formal appointment of Deputy Assistant Secretary of Commerce for Administration, Acting Assistant Secretary of Commerce for Administration and Acting Chief Financial Officer Wynn Coggins as Acting United States Secretary of Commerce in the early afternoon on January 20, 2021 pursuant to Executive Order 13613 titled “Providing an Order of Succession Within the Department of Commerce” that was signed by President Barack Obama on May 21, 2012 and the Federal Vacancies Reform Act of 1998. Prior to her appointment to the Department of Commerce, she was senior managing director of investments at Invesco.

== Education ==
Kelley earned a Bachelor of Science degree from the Villanova School of Business at Villanova University.

== Career ==
=== Finance ===
Kelley began her career at Drexel Burnham Lambert, where she worked on the Fixed Income High Grade Retail Desk and eventually became vice president in the bond department. She joined Invesco in 1989 as a money market portfolio manager. In 1992, Kelley became chief money market and government officer at the company. In 2007, she was named head of Invesco's fixed income and cash management team. In 2011, she became the firm's senior managing director of investments.

=== U.S. Department of Commerce ===
Kelley was unanimously confirmed by the U.S. Senate to serve as Under Secretary of Commerce for Economic Affairs on August 3, 2017, and she was subsequently sworn in on September 22, 2017. She assumed the duties of acting Deputy Secretary of Commerce upon being sworn in to the position of Undersecretary. President Donald Trump later announced on June 4, 2018, that Kelley would be nominated to serve full-time in the position of Deputy Secretary. The United States Senate confirmed Kelley to be Deputy Secretary of the Department of Commerce in a 62–38 vote on November 28, 2018.

== Personal life ==
Kelley is married to Joseph L. Kelley, a physician. The couple have three children.

== Notes ==
Government offices
| Preceded by Bruce H. Andrews | United States Deputy Secretary of Commerce; 2017–2021; Acting: 2017–2018 | Succeeded by Wynn Coggins; Acting |
| Preceded by Wilbur Ross | United States Secretary of Commerce; Acting; 2021 | Succeeded by Wynn Coggins; Acting |
