= Donna F. Tuttle =

American businesswoman

5th United States Deputy Secretary of Commerce
- In office July 12, 1988 – January 20, 1989
- President: Ronald Reagan; George H. W. Bush
- Preceded by: Bud Brown
- Succeeded by: Thomas J. Murrin

2nd Under Secretary of Commerce for Travel and Tourism
- In office December 13, 1983 – 1988
- President: Ronald Reagan
- Preceded by: Peter McCoy
- Succeeded by: Charles E. Cobb Jr.

Personal details
- Born: April 21, 1947 (age 79) Los Angeles, California, U.S.
- Party: Republican

Donna Frame Tuttle (born April 21, 1947) is an American businesswoman who served as the Under Secretary of Commerce for Travel and Tourism from 1983 to 1988 and as the United States Deputy Secretary of Commerce from 1988 to 1989.
