= Joe Wright (businessman) =

American businessman

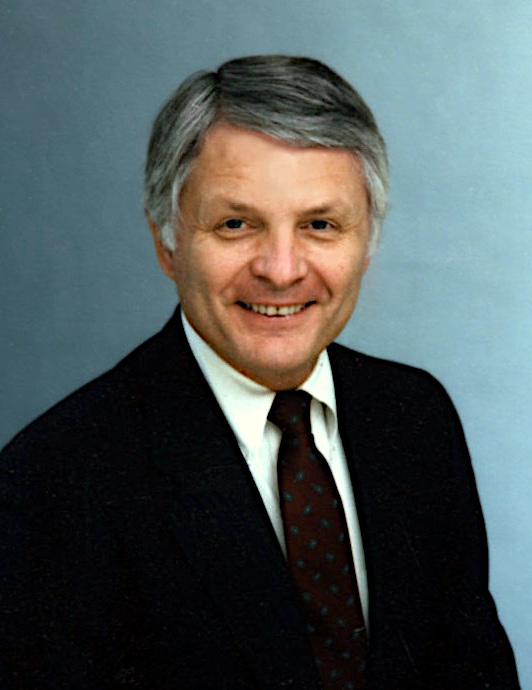

27th Director of the Office of Management and Budget
- In office October 16, 1988 – January 20, 1989
- President: Ronald Reagan
- Deputy: John F. Cogan
- Preceded by: Jim Miller
- Succeeded by: Dick Darman

2nd United States Deputy Secretary of Commerce
- In office January 29, 1981 – August 23, 1982
- President: Ronald Reagan
- Preceded by: Luther H. Hodges Jr.
- Succeeded by: Guy W. Fiske

Personal details
- Born: Joseph Robert Wright Jr. September 24, 1938 (age 87) Tulsa, Oklahoma, U.S.
- Party: Republican
- Spouse: Ellen Wright
- Education: Colorado School of Mines (BS); Yale University (MS)
- Website: Official website

Joseph Robert "Joe" Wright Jr. (born September 24, 1938) is an American businessman. From 1988 to 1989, he worked in the United States government as the Director of the Office of Management and Budget for president Ronald Reagan.

Wright currently is Chairman of Chart National's advisory board, Chairman of the Investment Committees of ClearSky Power and Technology Fund, LLC, ClearSky Security Fund, ClearSky Surry Capital, LLC, Altamira Technologies, SNA, and Sequoia Solutions. He sits on the Board of Systems Control. He is also Executive Partner to Comvest Partners and The Council of Chief Executives. He is a member of the Council on Foreign Relations, Economic Club of New York, Oklahoma Medical Research Foundation (OMRF) and Reagan Alumni Board.

Previously, he was a member of the Board of Cowen Inc., EBIX, Committee for a Responsible Federal Budget, Chairman of Intelsat, CEO of PanAmSat, Chairman of FedData, Chairman of GRC International, Executive Chairman of MTN Satellite Communications, CEO of Scientific Games, Co-chairman of Baker & Taylor, Vice Chairman and Director of W. R. Grace, Chairman of Grace Energy Company, President of Grace Environmental Company, Senior Advisor to Providence Equity, Vice Chairman of Terremark, President of two Citibank subsidiaries, Vice President and Partner of Booz, Allen and Hamilton, in addition to executive positions in several other smaller companies. He also previously was a Director of Travelers, Harcourt Brace Janovich, Kroll, Priority Holdings, Titan, Terremark Worldwide, Proxim, RealMed, Federal Signal, Education Management Corporation (EDMC), Hampton University, AT&T Government Markets, and others.

== Career ==
In the 1980s, Wright served in the U.S. Government under President Reagan as Deputy Secretary of Commerce and Deputy Director/Director of the Federal Office of Management and Budget (OMB) and was a member of the President's Cabinet. In addition, he held various management and economic positions in the Federal Departments of Defense, Commerce, and Agriculture.

Wright received the Distinguished Citizens Award from President Reagan; was appointed to the President's Export Council by President H.W. Bush as Chairman of the Export Control Sub-Committee; was appointed to the President's Commission on U.S. Postal Service Reform and the National Security Telecommunications Advisory Committee (NSTAC), the Federal Communications Commission's Network Reliability and Interoperability Council and several other advisory boards by President George W. Bush; and served on the Defense Business Board under three Presidents, including the present administration. Mr. Wright has an active Top-Secret clearance with the U.S. Government.

Wright received his undergraduate degree from the Colorado School of Mines and his graduate degree from Yale University. He and his wife, Ellen, a well-known author, painter and decorator, live in New York City.

=== Financial sector ===
Before the 1980s, Wright was President of Citicorp Retail Services and Retail Consumer Services, credit card subsidiaries of Citibank.

He began his career at Booz Allen Hamilton, Inc. where he became a Partner and the Division Head of the Growth Services consulting business.

Wright is on the Boards of Sequoia Holdings, Altamira Technologies, Systems Control and is a member of the Council on Foreign Relations, Council for Excellence in Government, Council of Chief Executives, The Economic Club of New York and Oklahoma Medical Research Foundation (OMRF).

Wright previously served on the Boards of Cowen, EBIX, FedData, Tempus Applied Solutions, Travelers, Harcourt Brace Janovich, Kroll, Titan, Proxim, Barington Capital Group, L.P., Hampton University, Priority Holdings, AmTec, RealMed Corp., Verso Tech, AT&T Government Markets and was on the Committee for a Responsible Federal Budget and others. He has also been a Producer in two movies, directed by David Rosenthal, entitled "A Single Shot", and "Falling Up".

== Awards ==
Wright received the Distinguished Citizens Award from President Reagan and the Distinguished Achievement Award from Colorado School of Mines. He was also awarded the Government Computer News Annual Award for Excellence at the Government Computer Expo. in 1985. Wright was presented with the Marquis Who's Who Albert Nelson Marquis Lifetime Achievement Award in July 2021.

== Personal life ==
Wright lives with his wife, Ellen, in Florida.

Political offices
| Preceded by Edwin L. Harper | Deputy Director of the Office of Management and Budget; 1982–1988 | Succeeded by John F. Cogan |
| Preceded by Jim Miller | Director of the Office of Management and Budget; 1988–1989 | Succeeded by Dick Darman |
