= Thomas J. Murrin =

US Deputy Secretary of Commerce (1929–2012)

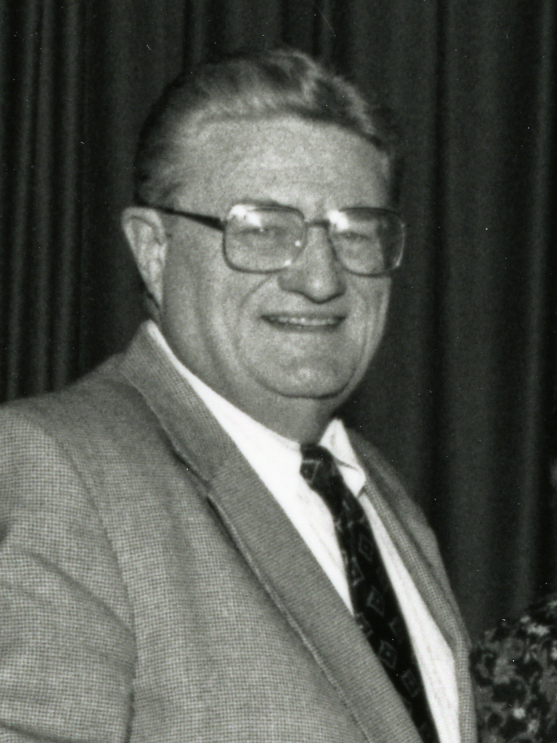

6th United States Deputy Secretary of Commerce
- In office February 11, 1989 – April 17, 1991
- President: George H. W. Bush
- Preceded by: Donna F. Tuttle
- Succeeded by: Rockwell A. Schnabel

Personal details
- Born: April 30, 1929 Manhattan, New York City, New York
- Died: January 30, 2012 (aged 82) Pittsburgh, Pennsylvania
- Party: Republican

Thomas J. Murrin (April 30, 1929 – January 30, 2012) was an American businessman who served as the United States Deputy Secretary of Commerce from 1989 to 1991.

He died on January 30, 2012, in Pittsburgh, Pennsylvania at age 82.
