= Bruce H. Andrews =

American attorney (born 1968)

Bruce Andrews
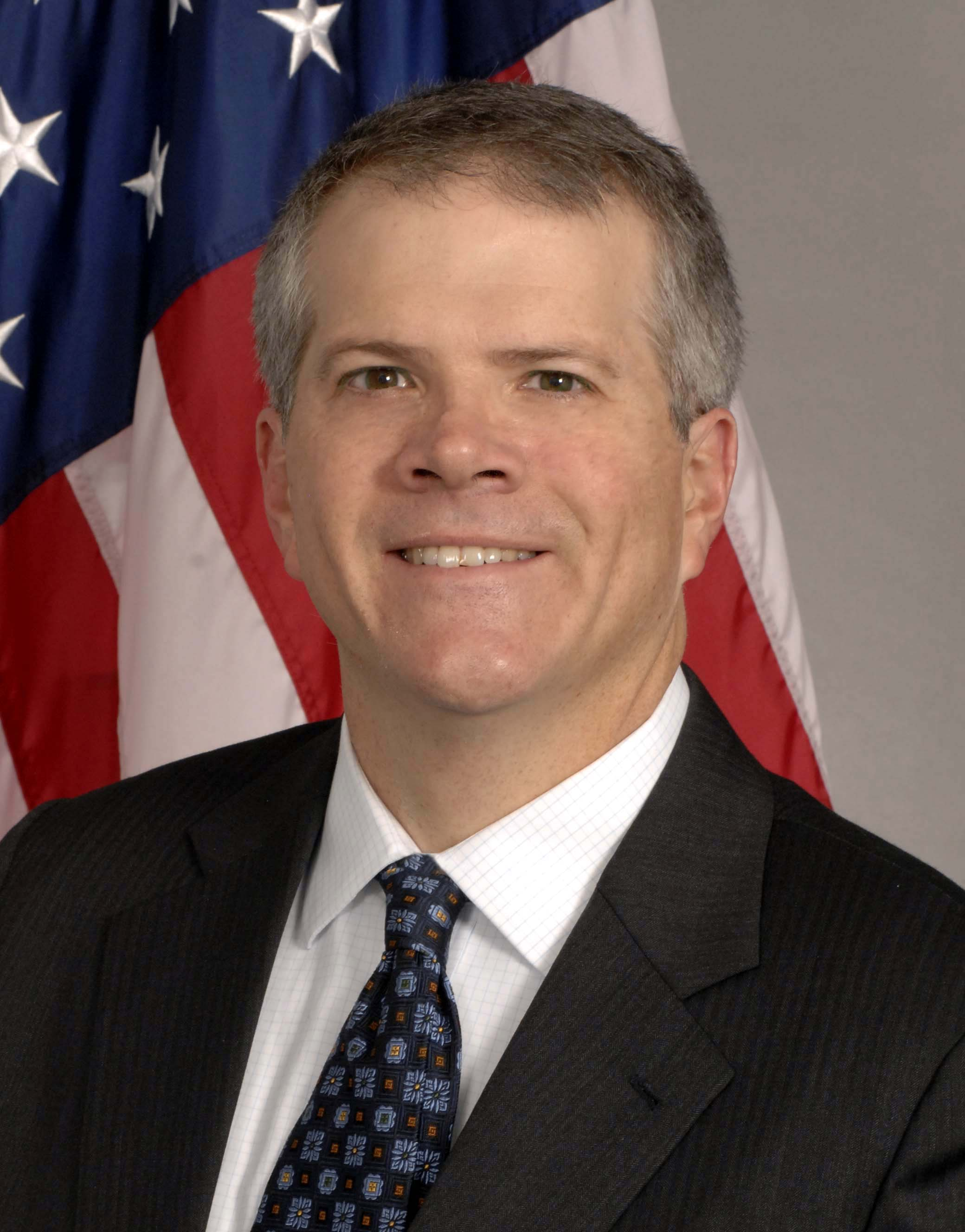

16th United States Deputy Secretary of Commerce
- In office June 9, 2014 – January 20, 2017; Acting: June 9, 2014 – July 24, 2014
- President: Barack Obama
- Preceded by: Rebecca Blank
- Succeeded by: Karen Dunn Kelley

Personal details
- Born: February 24, 1968 (age 58) Syracuse, New York, U.S.
- Party: Democratic
- Education: Haverford College (BA); Georgetown University (JD)

Bruce Huntington Andrews (born February 24, 1968) is an American attorney who served as United States Deputy Secretary of Commerce from 2014 to 2017.

== Early life and education ==
Andrews is a native of Syracuse, New York. He graduated from Nottingham High School in Syracuse, New York. He is a graduate of the Georgetown University Law Center and Haverford College.

== Deputy Secretary of Commerce ==
President Obama nominated Andrews to the position on May 22, 2014. Bruce Andrews was confirmed as the Deputy Secretary of Commerce on July 24, 2014. Andrews was named Acting Deputy Secretary of Commerce by President Obama and Secretary Penny Pritzker on June 9, 2014.

== Political service ==
Andrews served as Chief of Staff to the Secretary at the U.S. Department of Commerce from October 2011 till his appointment as Deputy Secretary.

Prior to joining the department, Andrews served as General Counsel for the United States Senate Committee on Commerce, Science and Transportation, where he served as the chief counsel for the committee and was responsible for policy, legal and jurisdiction issues.

== Legal career ==
Before joining the Committee staff, Andrews served as Vice President of Governmental Affairs for the Ford Motor Company, where he oversaw the company's federal and state government affairs. Prior to joining Ford, Andrews practiced law as an attorney in the Public Policy and Telecommunications Groups at Arnold & Porter. He was also a founding member of the firm Quinn Gillespie & Associates, where he worked with clients on a variety of issues related to transportation, technology, judiciary, telecommunications and financial services.

Andrews began his career on Capitol Hill where he served as Legislative Director for Representative Tim Holden (D-PA), as well as Legislative Assistant for former Representative Gus Yatron (D-PA) and on the staff of former Senator Alan Cranston (D-CA).

== Personal life ==
He lives with his wife and children in Washington, D.C.

Political offices
Preceded by Patrick D. Gallagher; Acting	United States Deputy Secretary of Commerce; 2014–2017	Succeeded by Karen Kelley
