= Samuel Bodman =

American businessman, engineer and politician (1938-2018)

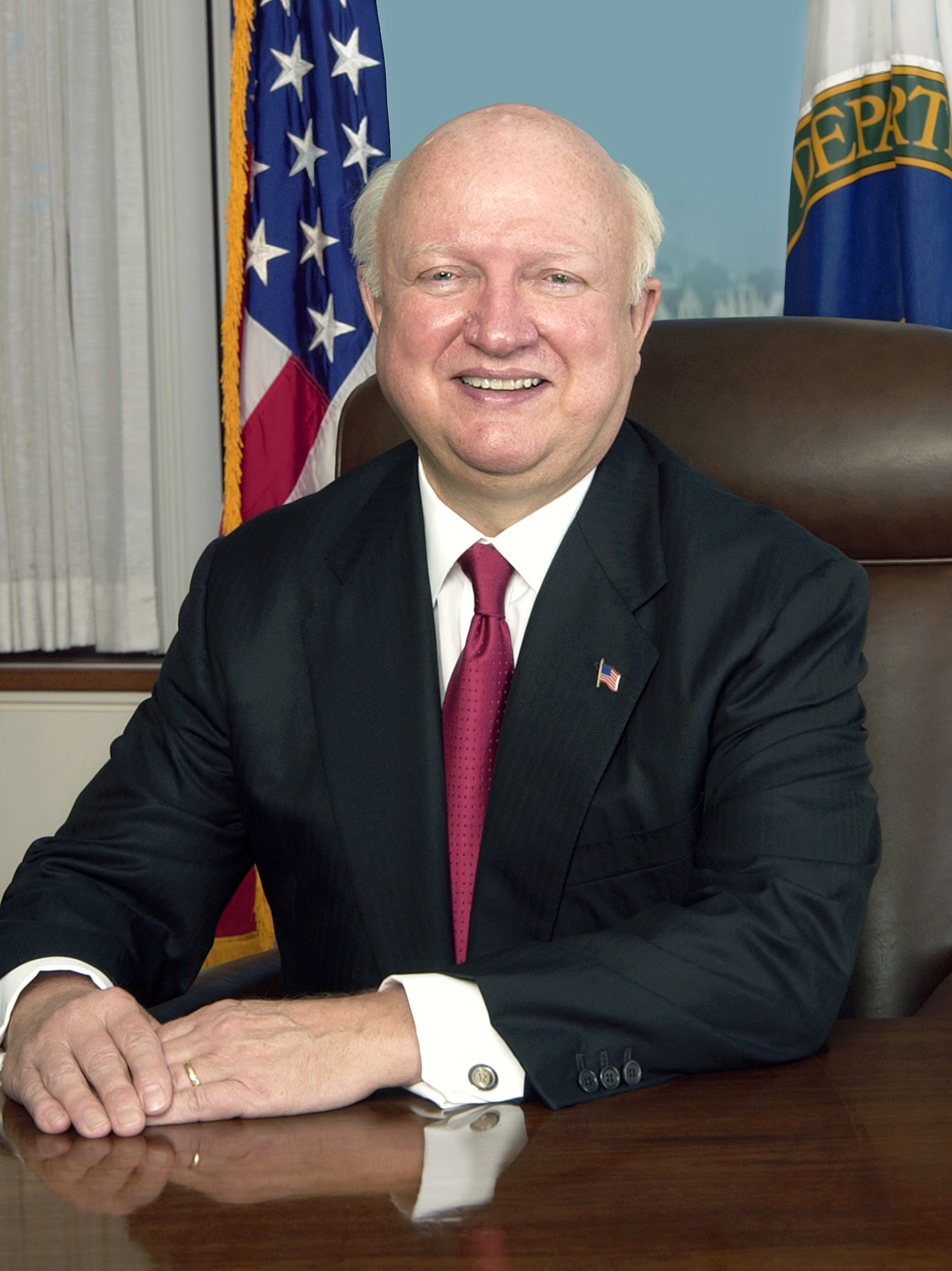
- Official portrait, 2005

11th United States Secretary of Energy
- In office January 31, 2005 – January 20, 2009
- President: George W. Bush
- Preceded by: Spencer Abraham
- Succeeded by: Steven Chu

10th United States Deputy Secretary of the Treasury
- In office August 2004 – January 31, 2005
- President: George W. Bush
- Preceded by: Kenneth W. Dam
- Succeeded by: Robert Kimmitt

10th United States Deputy Secretary of Commerce
- In office January 22, 2001 – July 16, 2004
- President: George W. Bush
- Preceded by: Robert Mallett
- Succeeded by: Theodore Kassinger

Personal details
- Born: Samuel Wright Bodman III; November 26, 1938 Chicago, Illinois, U.S.
- Died: September 7, 2018 (aged 79) El Paso, Texas, U.S.
- Party: Republican
- Spouse: Diane Petrella Barber
- Education: Cornell University (BS); Massachusetts Institute of Technology (MS, DSc)

Samuel Wright Bodman III (November 26, 1938 – September 7, 2018) was an American businessman, engineer, and politician who served as the 11th United States secretary of energy during the George W. Bush administration, from 2005 to 2009. He was also, at different times, the Deputy Secretary of the Treasury and the Deputy Secretary of Commerce.

In December 2004, Bodman was nominated to replace Spencer Abraham as the Energy Secretary and was confirmed unanimously by the United States Senate on January 31, 2005. During his tenure, he oversaw the security problems at Los Alamos National Laboratory and a budget in excess of $23 billion and over 100,000 federal and contractor employees.

== Early life and education ==
Bodman was born on November 26, 1938, in Chicago, Illinois, the son of Lina (Lindsay) and Samuel Wright Bodman. Bodman spent his early years in the Chicago suburbs before he graduated in 1961 with a Bachelor of Chemical Engineering from Cornell University. He was a member of Alpha Sigma Phi fraternity and the Sphinx Head Society.

In 1965, he completed his Doctor of Science in chemical engineering at the Massachusetts Institute of Technology.

== Career ==
Bodman served as an Associate Professor of Chemical Engineering at MIT and began his work in the financial sector as Technical Director of the American Research and Development Corporation, a venture capital firm.

From there, Bodman went to Fidelity Venture Associates, a division of the Fidelity Investments. In 1983 he was named President and Chief Operating Officer of Fidelity Investments and a Director of the Fidelity Group of Mutual Funds. In 1987, he joined Cabot Corporation, a Boston-based Fortune 300 company with global business activities in specialty chemicals and materials, where he served as Chairman, Chief Executive Officer, and a Director.

Bodman was a past director of M.I.T.'s School of Engineering Practice and a onetime member of the M.I.T. Commission on Education. He also was as a member of the Executive and Investment Committees at M.I.T., a member of the American Academy of Arts & Sciences, and a Trustee of the Isabella Stewart Gardner Museum, an art museum and the New England Aquarium.

He was also a past director of E. I. du Pont de Nemours and Company.

=== Fidelity Investments ===
In 1970, Bodman joined Fidelity Venture Associates, a division of Fidelity Investments, at a time when the firm had only around 40 employees. During his seventeen years at Fidelity, the last ten as President, he helped orchestrate the transformation of the company from a small investment firm into one of the nation's largest financial services enterprises. During his time at Fidelity, Bodman was instrumental in mentoring early fund managers, including giving Peter Lynch a small fund to manage.

=== Cabot Corporation ===
In January 1987, Bodman left Fidelity to join Cabot Corporation, a Boston-based specialty chemicals and materials company founded in 1882, as President and Chief Operating Officer; he became Chief Executive Officer in February 1988. When Bodman took the helm, the company's core product — carbon black, a soot-derived compound used in tyre manufacturing — had fallen out of favour with investors. Rather than diversifying away from it, Bodman chose to deepen Cabot's expertise in the material, earning him the nickname "the soot king" from Forbes magazine. He encouraged the firm to explore innovative applications for its chemicals, including uses in the microelectronics sector, and over 14 years successfully restored the company's profitability. Under his leadership, Cabot operated 45 manufacturing plants in 25 countries.

== Bush Administration ==
Bodman served as Deputy Secretary of the Treasury in the George W. Bush Administration beginning in February 2004. He also served the Bush Administration as the Deputy Secretary of Commerce beginning in 2001.

On December 10, 2004, Bodman was nominated to replace Spencer Abraham as the United States Secretary of Energy and was confirmed unanimously by the United States Senate on January 31, 2005, taking office the next day. He led the Department of Energy with a budget in excess of $23 billion and over 100,000 federal and contractor employees.

In February 2007, Bodman testified before the United States House Armed Services Subcommittee on Strategic Forces about security problems at Los Alamos National Laboratory. He stated that "The heart of the problem is a cultural issue at Los Alamos". He asserted that the impediment to improved security was "Arrogance. Arrogance of the chemists and physicists and engineers who work at Los Alamos and think they’re above it all".

=== Energy policy ===
During his tenure as United States Secretary of Energy, Bodman oversaw the passage of the Energy Policy Act of 2005, landmark energy legislation that Secretary Perry later credited as "the foundation for much of America's energy successes." Bodman was a proponent of nuclear power, arguing that the United States needed to build new reactors and develop a solution to nuclear waste through the Yucca Mountain nuclear waste repository. He championed the Global Nuclear Energy Partnership (GNEP), requesting $250 million from Congress in 2007 to advance it, and called for transitioning from spent fuel to nuclear recycling. On alternative energy, Bodman set a target of ethanol providing 25 percent of all U.S. motor fuel by 2012 and proposed increasing the Department of Energy's budget for alternative fuels, hybrid vehicles, solar, wind, and clean coal by 22 percent in fiscal year 2007. In 2006, Bodman quietly disbanded the [[Secretary of Energy Advisory Board]] (SEAB), the department's principal independent advisory body on scientific and technical matters, a move that drew criticism from the scientific community.

== Personal life ==
Bodman married M. Diane (Petrella) Barber in 1997. He had three children, two stepchildren, and eight grandchildren.

Bodman died in El Paso on September 7, 2018, at the age of 79. The cause of death was reported to be complications from primary progressive aphasia. His death was announced by former president George W. Bush on the same day.

Bodman was nominated by President Bush with praise for his qualities as "a problem solver who knows how to set goals and knows how to reach them." His death on September 7, 2018, from complications of primary progressive aphasia was announced by former President George W. Bush on the same day.

== Notes ==
Political offices
Preceded by Kenneth W. Dam	United States Deputy Secretary of the Treasury; August 2004–January 2005	Succeeded by Robert M. Kimmitt
Preceded by Robert L. Mallett	United States Deputy Secretary of Commerce; 2001–2004	Succeeded by Theodore W. Kassinger
Preceded by Spencer Abraham	United States Secretary of Energy; 2005–2009	Succeeded by Steven Chu
