= David J. Barram =

American politician and businessman (born 1943)

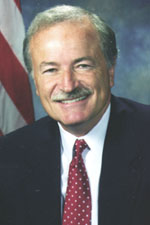

16th Administrator of the General Services Administration
- In office March 4, 1996 – December 15, 2000
- President: Bill Clinton
- Preceded by: Roger Johnson
- Succeeded by: Stephen A. Perry

8th United States Deputy Secretary of Commerce
- In office January 27, 1993 – May 14, 1996
- President: Bill Clinton
- Preceded by: Rockwell A. Schnabel
- Succeeded by: Robert L. Mallett

Personal details
- Born: December 27, 1943 (age 82)
- Party: Democratic

David J. Barram (born December 27, 1943) is an American businessman who served as the United States Deputy Secretary of Commerce from 1993 to 1996 and as Administrator of the General Services Administration from 1996 to 2000.

== Government service ==
Barram was interested in policy and politics. In the 1970s, he ran for Sunnyvale City Council but lost. His particular interest was in tech policy: he even went as far as sending position papers to every Democratic presidential nominee from Carter to Dukakis (without ever receiving a reply). In Bill Clinton's presidential campaign, he was known for working with the campaign to recruit Silicon Valley leaders, even pulling some famously Republican members of the valley to support Clinton.

He began at the GSA as Acting Administrator in March 1996 before being unanimously confirmed as Administrator by the U.S. Senate on May 23, 1997. At the time, as GSA Administrator he oversaw 14,600 employees with an annual $13 billion budget.

== Private sector experience ==
Before his governmental positions, he worked in a variety of tech companies. He started his career at Hewlett-Packard, eventually spending time as the CFO for Silicon Graphics and Apple.
