= Roger Johnson (California official) =

American businessman and government official (1934-2005)

Administrator of General Services
- In office 1993–1996
- President: Bill Clinton
- Preceded by: Richard Austin
- Succeeded by: David Barram

Personal details
- Born: March 29, 1934 Hartford, Connecticut
- Died: February 25, 2005 (aged 70) Laguna Beach, California
- Party: Democratic (1996-2005); Republican (until 1996)
- Spouse: Janice
- Children: Three children
- Education: Clarkson College of Technology (BBA); University of Massachusetts (MBA)
- Profession: Business executive

Roger Johnson (June 24, 1934 – February 21, 2005) was an American businessman and government official.

== Early life and education ==
Roger Wayne Johnson was born March 29, 1934, in Hartford, Connecticut. the son of an AFL-CIO leader. Although he was initially influenced by his father's Democratic Party politics, young Roger decided to join the Republican Party, according to him, the first time he had to pay taxes. Johnson was valedictorian at Clarkson College of Technology, where he graduated in 1956 with a degree in business. He had ambitions to play professional baseball, but a coach convinced him to get a job in business. Johnson earned a master of business administration from the University of Massachusetts in 1963. He eventually went to work for General Electric. In 1969, he left GE to work for Memorex, where he headed the disk drive division.

== Business career ==
In 1982, Johnson moved to Orange County, California, to take control of Western Digital. Under his control, the company's sales quadrupled, from $250 million to over $1 billion per year. The company went from 811 to 7,600 employees. He and his wife were also active in several charitable organizations, and he taught at the University of California, Irvine and at Claremont Graduate University.

== Clinton administration ==
In 1991, Johnson was chairman of a prominent Orange County Republican fund-raising organization. However, he discussed with a reporter of the Los Angeles Times the possibility of leaving the Republican Party and joining the Democratic Party if the right Democrat came along. Bill Clinton took him up on the offer and met with him to see if he could obtain his support. Johnson and seven other prominent Orange County Republicans announced that they would support Clinton's bid for President.

In 1992, Clinton nominated Johnson to head the government's General Services Administration. Johnson said the position gave him a new outlook on governmental waste. He wrote It Can Be Fixed! Your Unmanaged Government, a book which discussed his beliefs as to how to end waste in government. Johnson boasted that he had cut the GSA's staff by 4000 and cut its operating costs by 17%. But he found himself at odds with professional bureaucrats, and various investigations into his personal finances and use of government property led to his resignation in 1996. He was cleared of all charges the following year.

== Post-administration ==
Following his resignation, Johnson attacked the conservatism of the Congress under its leader Newt Gingrich, and officially announced his switch from the Republican Party to the Democratic Party.

In 1998, Johnson and his wife Janice pledged $500,000 to endow the Roger W. and Janice M. Johnson Chair in Civic Governance and the Social Ecology of Public Management. The Johnsons saw the chair position as a way to improve public management and civic participation. "I see the chair as a way to elevate professional management to a level similar to other recognized national policy issues such as health care, education and welfare," Roger Johnson said. "Only then will professional management have sufficient political clout to be taken seriously in government organizations." In 2003, Martha Feldman, an organizational and public management scholar from University of Michigan, was named the second Johnson Chair.

Johnson died of lung cancer at his home in Laguna Beach, California, on February 25, 2005.

== See also ==
- List of U.S. political appointments that crossed party lines

Political offices
Preceded by Richard Austin	Administrator of General Services; Served under: Bill Clinton; 1993–1996	Succeeded by David Barram
