= Jeremy Pelter =

American government official

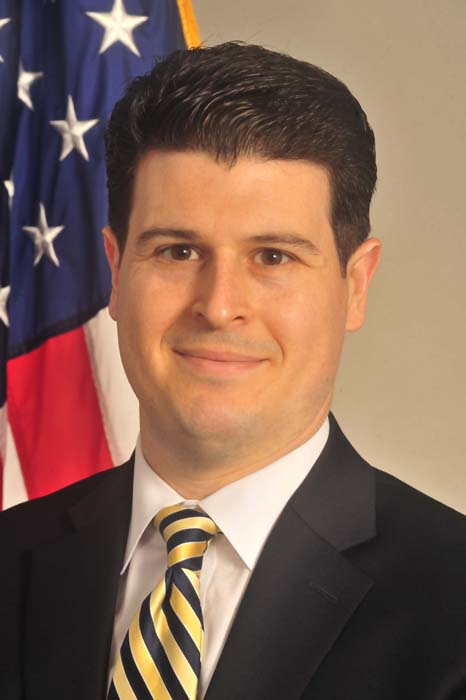

Acting United States Deputy Secretary of Commerce
- In office February 21, 2025 – June 26, 2025
- President: Donald Trump
- Secretary: Howard Lutnick
- Preceded by: Don Graves
- Succeeded by: Paul Dabbar

Acting United States Secretary of Commerce
- In office January 20, 2025 – February 21, 2025
- President: Donald Trump
- Preceded by: Don Graves (acting)
- Succeeded by: Howard Lutnick

Personal details
- Education: Indiana University Bloomington (BA); University of Maryland, University College (MS)

Jeremy E. Pelter is an American nonprofit executive and former U.S. government official who served as the acting United States Secretary of Commerce from January 20 to February 21, 2025 and as acting United States Deputy Secretary of Commerce from February to June 2025. He currently serves as a nonprofit executive in the Artificial Intelligence and National Security sector.

== Education ==
Pelter earned a Bachelor of Arts in political science from Indiana University, and a Master of Science in management from the University of Maryland University College.

== Career ==
Before working at the Department of Commerce, he served at the U.S. Small Business Administration and in the nonprofit sector in several financial and operational roles. He was a member of the inaugural cohort of the White House Leadership Development Program working with the Office of Management and Budget (OMB) and the National Economic Council (NEC) on transborder trade. His first senior executive service role was Chief Financial Officer and Director of Administration for the Economics and Statistics Administration.

As a career member of the senior executive service, Pelter next served as a senior advisor to the United States Deputy Secretary of Commerce, then as Deputy Under Secretary of Commerce for Industry and Security at the Bureau of Industry and Security. He then became the department's Deputy Assistant Secretary of Commerce for Administration.

Unique in U.S. Department of Commerce records, Pelter is the only known official, career or otherwise, to serve as an acting Assistant Secretary (Chief Financial Officer and Assistant Secretary of Commerce for Administration from May 2022-Jan 2025 and Jun 2025-Mar 2026); acting Under Secretary (Under Secretary of Commerce for Industry and Security Dec 2020-Apr 2022); acting Deputy Secretary of Commerce (Feb 20225-Jun 2025); and acting Secretary of Commerce (Jan 2025-Feb 2025). All typically presidentially appointed-senate confirmed (PAS) roles on the executive schedule.

Pelter was appointed the acting United States Secretary of Commerce by President Donald Trump on January 20, 2025. He acted as the Deputy Secretary of Commerce following the confirmation of Secretary Howard Lutnick.

Political offices
Preceded by Don Graves; Acting	United States Secretary of Commerce; Acting; 2025	Succeeded by Howard Lutnick
Preceded by Don Graves	United States Deputy Secretary of Commerce; Acting; 2025	Succeeded by Paul Dabbar
