= NLRB v. SW General, Inc. =

- Supreme Court of the United States

Argued November 7, 2016 Decided March 21, 2017
- Full case name: National Labor Relations Board, Petitioner v. SW General, Inc., dba Southwest Ambulance
- Docket no.: 15-1251
- Citations: 580 U.S. ___ (more) 137 S. Ct. 929; 197 L. Ed. 2d 263

Case history
- Prior: 796 F.3d 67 (D.C. Cir. August 7, 2015).

Holding
- The Federal Vacancies Reform Act prevents a person who has been nominated to fill a vacant office requiring Senate confirmation from performing the duties of that office in an acting capacity. The prohibition applies to anyone performing acting service under the FVRA.

Court membership
- Chief Justice John Roberts Associate Justices Anthony Kennedy · Clarence Thomas; Ruth Bader Ginsburg · Stephen Breyer; Samuel Alito · Sonia Sotomayor; Elena Kagan

Case opinions
- Majority: Roberts, joined by Kennedy, Thomas, Breyer, Alito, and Kagan
- Concurrence: Thomas
- Dissent: Sotomayor, joined by Ginsburg

Laws applied
- Federal Vacancies Reform Act of 1998

National Labor Relations Board v. SW General, Inc., 580 U.S. 288 (2017), was a case before Supreme Court of the United States concerning the interpretation of the Federal Vacancies Reform Act of 1998 (FVRA). The Court held that 5 U.S.C. § 3345(b)(1) prohibits a person who has been nominated to fill a Senate-confirmed office from serving in that office in an acting capacity, subject to a limited exception for certain "first assistants" who had served in that role for at least 90 days during the year preceding the vacancy.

In a 6–2 decision, the Court affirmed the judgment of the United States Court of Appeals for the District of Columbia Circuit. Chief Justice John Roberts delivered the opinion of the Court.

== Background ==
The Federal Vacancies Reform Act of 1998 governs the temporary filling of vacant executive branch positions that require presidential appointment with Senate confirmation and requires agencies to report such acting service to Congress and the Government Accountability Office. The Act permits certain nominees to serve in an acting capacity if they previously served for at least 90 days as the office’s “first assistant,” the statutory term for the designated deputy to the vacant office.

President Barack Obama nominated Lafe Solomon to serve as NLRB general counsel in January 2011. The nomination was returned by the Senate at the end of the 112th Congress and resubmitted in May 2013. The 2013 nomination was withdrawn in August.

After facing an unfair labor practice complaint issued under Solomon’s authority, SW General challenged his service as unlawful under the FVRA, arguing that the complaint was invalid. On August 7, 2015, the United States Court of Appeals for the District of Columbia Circuit ruled in favor of SW General in an opinion by Judge Karen L. Henderson, joined by Judges Sri Srinivasan and Robert L. Wilkins.

The Supreme Court granted certiorari to determine whether the restriction in 5 U.S.C. § 3345(b)(1) on acting service by a nominated official applies only to first assistants serving under 5 U.S.C. § 3345(a)(1), or also to officials serving in an acting capacity under 5 U.S.C. § 3345(a)(2) and 5 U.S.C. § 3345(a)(3). On November 7, 2016, oral arguments were heard before the Supreme Court, where acting Solicitor General Ian Heath Gershengorn appeared for the government.

== Opinion of the Court ==
On March 21, 2017, the Supreme Court delivered judgment in favor of the company, voting 6-2 to affirm the lower court. Chief Justice John Roberts wrote that the exception did not cover Solomon, rejected the government's argument that a ruling against it would hamstring future presidents and call into question dozens of temporary appointments made over the years, and dismissed arguments that historical practice supported the government. Since the law was enacted in 1998, three presidents have nominated 112 people for permanent posts who also were serving as acting officials. There was never any objection from Congress.

=== Justice Thomas' Concurrence ===
Justice Clarence Thomas concurred, arguing that the Appointments Clause "likely prohibited" the appointment.

=== Justice Sotomayor's Dissent ===
Justice Sonia Sotomayor, joined by Justice Ruth Bader Ginsburg, argued that the Senate never objected over the years while more than 100 people served in an acting capacity pending their nomination for a permanent post.
