= Don Graves =

American lawyer

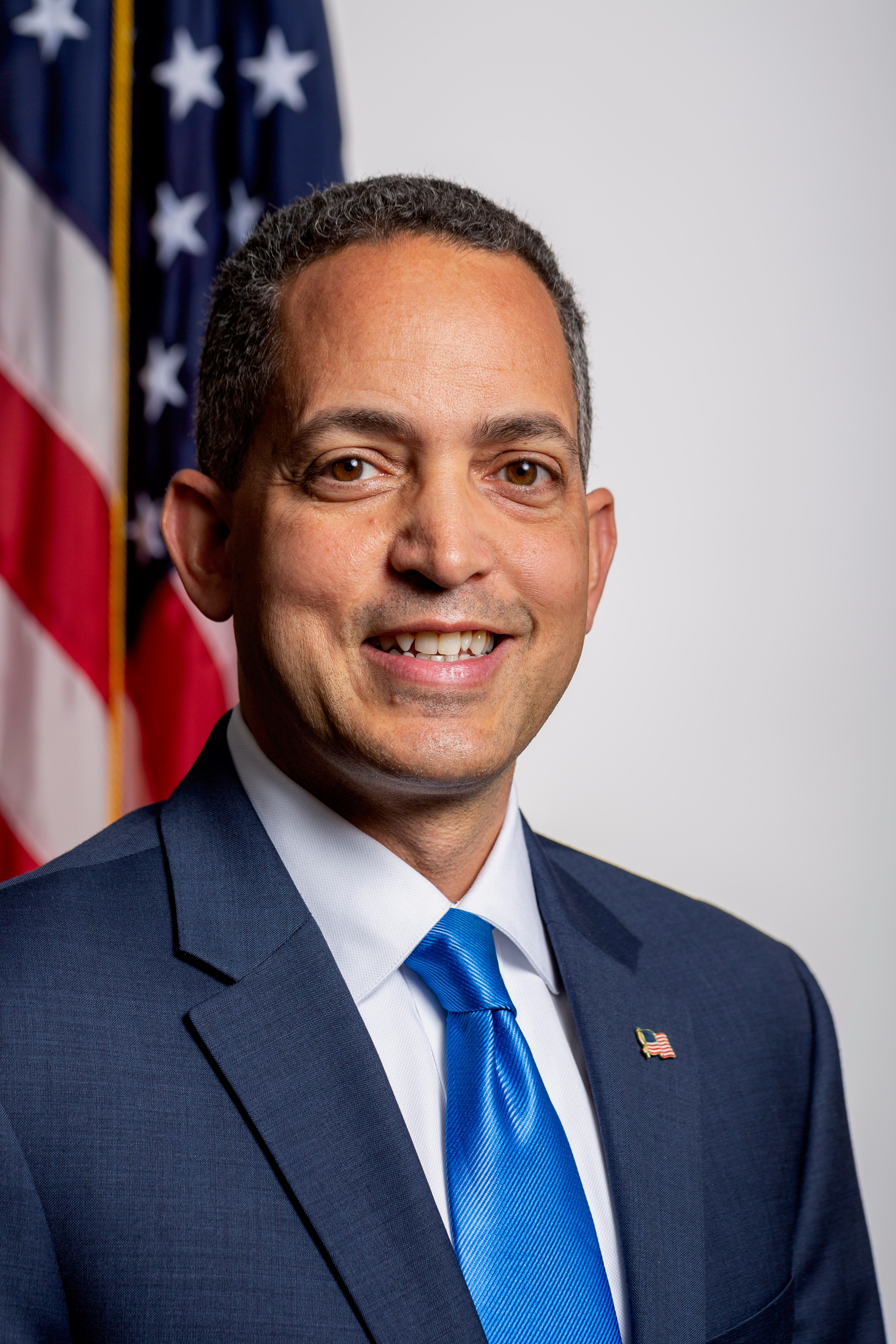
- Official portrait, 2021

Acting United States Secretary of Commerce
- In office January 20, 2025 (approximately two hours) (Note: Graves served as Acting United States Secretary of Commerce in his capacity as United States Deputy Secretary of Commerce for approximately two hours on January 20, 2025 from the time of the formal resignation of Gina Raimondo as United States Secretary of Commerce at noon on January 20, 2025 until the time of the formal appointment of Deputy Assistant Secretary of Commerce for Administration, Acting Assistant Secretary of Commerce for Administration and Acting Chief Financial Officer Jeremy Pelter as Acting United States Secretary of Commerce in the early afternoon on January 20, 2025 pursuant to Executive Order 13613 titled “Providing an Order of Succession Within the Department of Commerce” that was signed by President Barack Obama on May 21, 2012 and the Federal Vacancies Reform Act of 1998.)
- President: Donald Trump
- Preceded by: Gina Raimondo
- Succeeded by: Jeremy Pelter (acting)

18th United States Deputy Secretary of Commerce
- In office May 14, 2021 – January 20, 2025
- President: Joe Biden
- Preceded by: Karen Dunn Kelley
- Succeeded by: Paul Dabbar

Personal details
- Party: Democratic
- Education: Williams College (BA); Georgetown University (JD)

Donet Dominic Graves Jr. is an American lawyer. He served as United States Deputy Secretary of Commerce in the Biden administration from 2021 to 2025. Graves also served as Acting United States Secretary of Commerce in his capacity as United States Deputy Secretary of Commerce for approximately two hours on January 20, 2025 from the time of the formal resignation of Gina Raimondo as United States Secretary of Commerce at noon on January 20, 2025 until the time of the formal appointment of Deputy Assistant Secretary of Commerce for Administration, Acting Assistant Secretary of Commerce for Administration and Acting Chief Financial Officer Jeremy Pelter as Acting United States Secretary of Commerce in the early afternoon on January 20, 2025 pursuant to Executive Order 13613 titled “Providing an Order of Succession Within the Department of Commerce” that was signed by President Barack Obama on May 21, 2012 and the Federal Vacancies Reform Act of 1998. Graves also formerly led the Beau Biden Cancer Moonshot and served in multiple roles in the Obama administration, including as an advisor to then-Vice President Joe Biden.

== Early life and education ==
Graves grew up on the East Side of Cleveland, Ohio. Graves earned a Bachelor of Arts degree in political science and history from Williams College and a Juris Doctor from the Georgetown University Law Center.

== Career ==
From 1995 to 1997, Graves was the vice president and Washington, D.C. office director of New Equality. From 1997 to 1999, Graves was a policy advisor in the United States Department of the Treasury. From 1999 to 2005, he was the policy director of Business Roundtable. He was a founding partner at Graves & Horton, LLC, a legal services firm.

During the presidency of Barack Obama, Graves served as the executive director of the President's Council on Jobs and Competitiveness and led the federal government's efforts in the economic recovery of the city of Detroit. After the council disbanded, Graves served as Counselor and Domestic and Economic Policy Director to Vice President Joe Biden.

Graves also served as Deputy Assistant Secretary for Small Business, Community Development, and Housing Policy at the Department of the Treasury, where he oversaw the CDFI Fund, the $4 billion Small Business Lending Fund, and the $1.5 billion State Small Business Credit Initiative. He was also the U.S. Federal Representative to the G7 Task Force on Social Impact Investment.

In 2016, Biden chose Graves to lead the Beau Biden Cancer Moonshot. After the Obama administration, Graves worked as the head of corporate responsibility and community relations and senior director of corporate community initiatives and relations at KeyBank.

=== Deputy Secretary of Commerce ===
In January 2021, President-elect Biden announced his nomination of Graves as the United States Deputy Secretary of Commerce. Graves was confirmed by the US Senate by a vote of 89–7 on May 13, 2021. He was sworn in the next day.
