= 1982 Ohio gubernatorial election =

- November 2, 1982
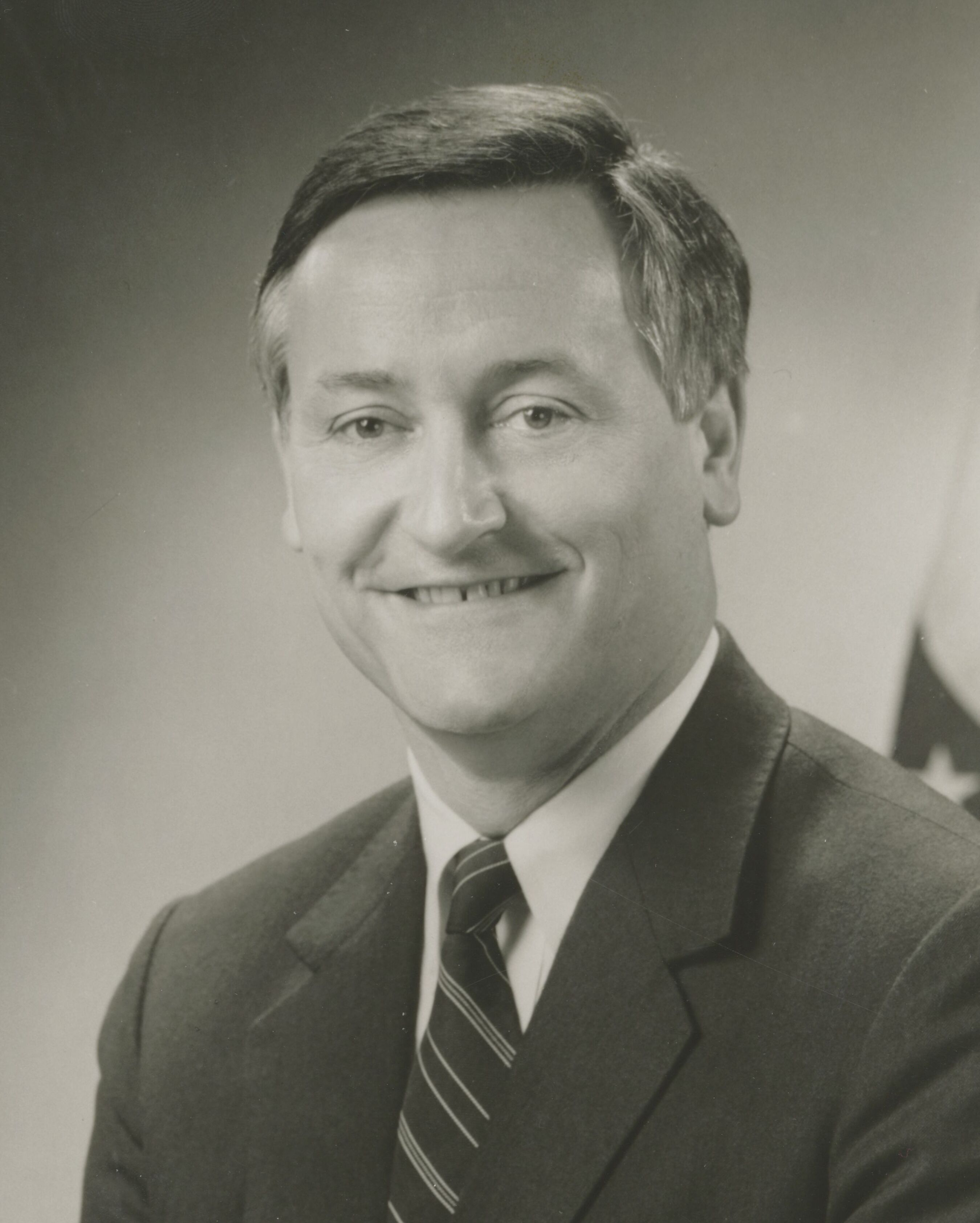

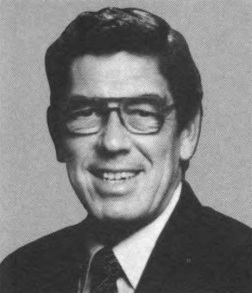
Nominee	Dick Celeste	Bud Brown
Party	Democratic	Republican
Running mate	Myrl Shoemaker	Jim Betts
Popular vote	1,981,882	1,303,962
Percentage	59.04%	38.85%
- County results Celeste: 40–50% 50–60% 60–70% 70–80% Brown: 40–50% 50–60% 60–70%
Governor before election
Jim Rhodes
Republican
Elected Governor
Dick Celeste
Democratic

The 1982 Ohio gubernatorial election was held in Ohio on November 2, 1982. Dick Celeste of the Democratic Party was elected with 59% of the vote.

As of 2024, this is the last time Butler County and Holmes County voted for the Democratic candidate. Hamilton County would not vote Democratic in a gubernatorial contest again until 2018.

== Democratic primary ==
=== Candidates ===
- William J. Brown, Attorney General of Ohio
- Dick Celeste, nominee for Governor in 1978 and former Director of the Peace Corps and Lieutenant Governor
- Jerry Springer, former mayor of Cincinnati

=== Results ===
Democratic primary results by county Celeste: 30–40%; 40–50%; 50–60%; 60–70%; 70–80%; Brown: 30–40%; 40–50%; 50–60%; 60–70%; 80–90%; Springer: 30–40%; 40–50%; 50–60%; 60–70%; 70–80%

Democratic primary results
Party	Candidate	Votes	%
Democratic	Dick Celeste	436,887	42.40
Democratic	William J. Brown	383,007	37.17
Democratic	Jerry Springer	210,524	20.43
Total votes		1,030,418	100.0

== Republican primary ==
=== Candidates ===
- Bud Brown, U.S. Representative from Urbana
- Seth Taft, former Cuyahoga County Commissioner and son of Charles Phelps Taft II
- Bob Teater, director of the Ohio Department of Natural Resources
- Tom Van Meter, State Senator from Ashland

=== Results ===
Republican primary results
Party	Candidate	Votes	%
Republican	Bud Brown	347,176	51.54
Republican	Seth Taft	153,806	22.84
Republican	Tom Van Meter	136,761	20.30
Republican	Bob Teater	35,821	5.32
Total votes		673,564	100.00

== General election ==
Gubernatorial election results
Party	Candidate	Votes	%
Democratic	Dick Celeste	1,981,882	59.04
Republican	Clarence "Bud" Brown, Jr	1,303,962	38.85
Libertarian	Phyllis Goetz	39,114	1.17
Independent (United States)	Erwin Reupert	17,484	0.52
Independent (United States)	Kurt O. Landefiled	14,279	0.43
Total votes		3,356,721	100.00
Democratic gain from Republican		Swing	
