= Dennis Hightower =

American government official (born 1941)

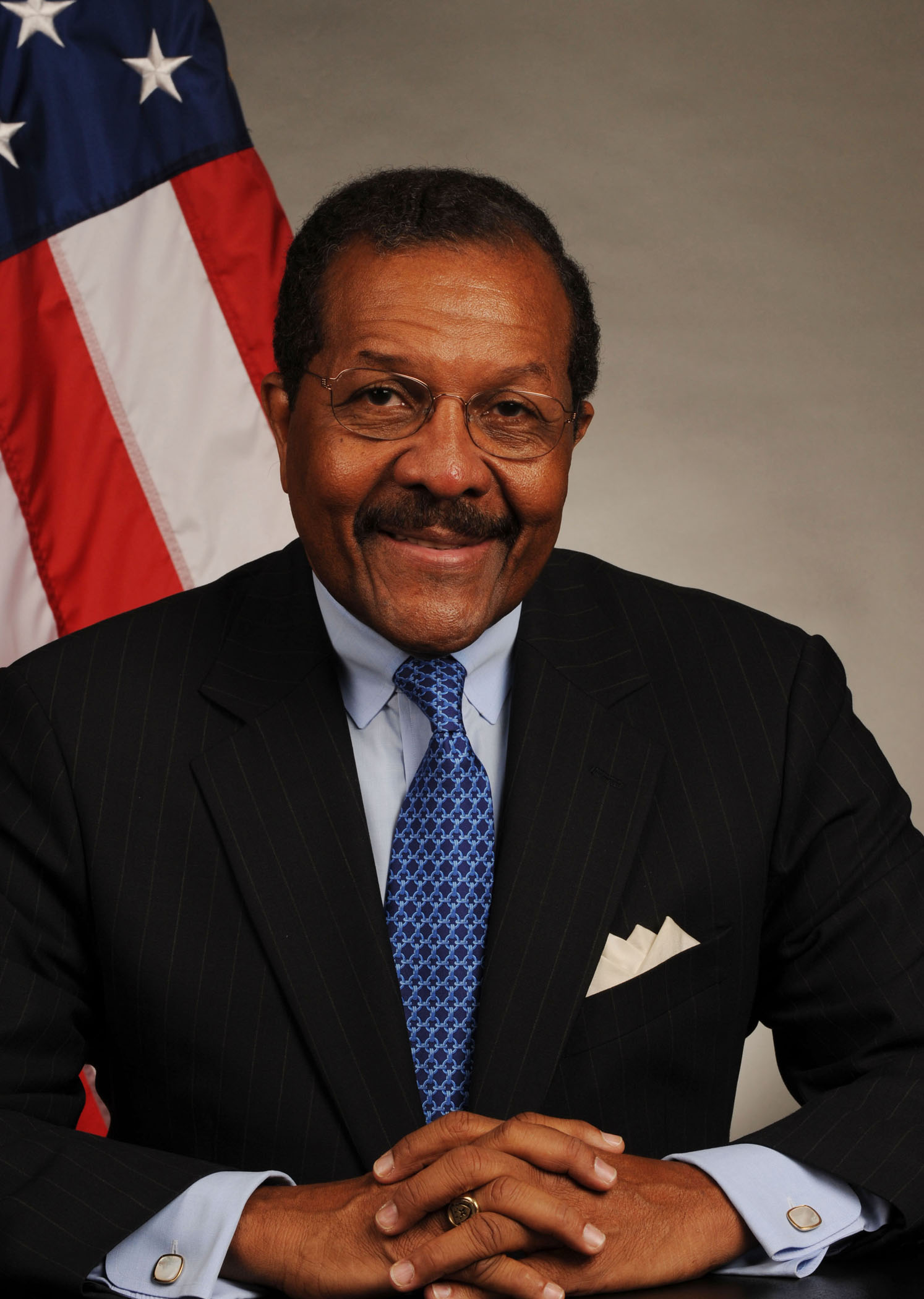
- Official portrait, 2009

14th United States Deputy Secretary of Commerce
- In office August 11, 2009 – August 27, 2010
- President: Barack Obama
- Preceded by: John Sullivan
- Succeeded by: Rebecca Blank

Personal details
- Born: Dennis Fowler Hightower Washington D.C., U.S.
- Education: Howard University (BS); Harvard University (MBA)

Military service
- Allegiance: United States
- Branch/service: United States Army
- Years of service: 1962-1970
- Rank: Major
- Battles/wars: Vietnam War

Dennis Fowler Hightower is a former United States Army officer, retired business executive, college educator, and public servant who was the United States Deputy Secretary of Commerce from August 11, 2009 to August 27, 2010.

== Early life and education ==
Hightower spent his formative years in Washington, D.C., as one of the first students at LeDroit Park Nursery School, prior to attending Lucretia Mott Elementary School and Benjamin Banneker Jr High School - two pre-eminent schools for African American students in then-segregated Washington, DC.

Hightower graduated from McKinley High School in 1958, at age 16. He entered Howard University that same year and graduated in 1962, at age 20, with a BS degree.

== Military service ==
Commissioned as a Regular Army 2d Lieutenant in June 1962, Hightower completed the US Army Ranger School and US Army Airborne School, and served in the 1st Bn/501st Infantry, 101st Airborne Division as a platoon leader, company commander, and S-3 air operations officer. Later, he was trained in counterintelligence and field operations intelligence (HUMINT); and served in strategic and operational assignments in the US and abroad with the 502nd Military Intelligence Bn, and Soviet/Eastern Europe operations with both the Defense Intelligence Agency and the Department of the Army's Office of the Assistant Chief of Staff for Intelligence. While pursuing graduate studies in Soviet and Eastern Europe Affairs, Hightower was inducted into Pi Sigma Alpha (National Political Science Honor Society).

Hightower served in Vietnam with the 199th Infantry Brigade (Separate) (Light) as Intelligence Officer, 4th Bn/12th Infantry; Commanding Officer, 179th Military Intelligence Detachment; and as Intelligence Officer, 199th Infantry Brigade. He was promoted to the rank of Major in Vietnam at age 27.

During his eight-year military career, he was awarded numerous individual decorations including 2 Bronze Star Medals, the Purple Heart Medal, 3 Air Medals, the Joint Service Commendation Medal, 5 Army Commendation Medals (one with "V" device for Valor in Combat), and the Republic of Vietnam Honor Medal (First Class). In addition, he was the recipient of four Unit Combat Awards, the Master Combat Infantryman Badge (combined Combat and Expert Infantryman Badges), Army Ranger Tab, and Senior Parachutist Badge. Hightower resigned his commission in June 1970, after early selection to attend the United States Army Command and General College.

== Career ==
After his military service, Hightower joined Xerox, and two years later, he was awarded a fellowship to study at Harvard Business School, from which he earned his MBA in 1974. Following that, he was a senior associate/engagement manager at McKinsey & Company; vice president and general manager of General Electric's lighting business in Mexico; vice president of corporate strategy at Mattel; and managing director at Russell Reynolds Associates in Los Angeles.

In 1987, Hightower was recruited by The Walt Disney Company, where he was president of Disney Consumer Products for Europe, Middle East and Africa, based in Paris. He retired in June 1996.

In July 1996, Hightower joined the faculty of Harvard Business School, initially as a Senior Lecturer (1996–97), and for three years thereafter as Professor of Management in the first year MBA program, where he focused on leadership, building emerging markets, and global general management. From 2000 to 2001, Hightower was CEO of Europe Online Networks, a privately held company in Luxembourg that provided internet-based online service and satellite broadband interactive networks. He returned to the United States to be treated for cancer.

Hightower was confirmed unanimously by the United States Senate on August 7, 2009 to replace John J. Sullivan, who resigned from this office on January 20, 2009.

Hightower resigned on August 27, 2010, due to a health-related matter, to return to the private sector.

Political offices
Preceded by John Sullivan	United States Deputy Secretary of Commerce; 2009–2010	Succeeded by Rebecca Blank
