= Otto J. Wolff =

American executive

Otto Wolff
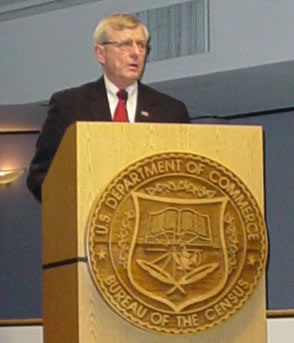
- Otto Wolff at a 2004 Acquisition Conference

Acting United States Secretary of Commerce
- In office January 20, 2009 – March 26, 2009
- President: Barack Obama
- Preceded by: John J. Sullivan (acting)
- Succeeded by: Gary Locke

Personal details
- Born: Otto Jay Wolff

Otto Jay Wolff served as acting United States Secretary of Commerce in the administration of President Barack Obama. Wolff previously served under President George W. Bush as the chief financial officer of the Department of Commerce, overseeing its $5.6 billion budget.

Wolff served in the Commerce Department under the presidency of Ronald Reagan, continuing in a role there until 1995 when he took an appointment to the House Administration Committee. He returned to the Commerce Department afterward, serving as Chief Financial Officer and Assistant Secretary for Administration, after being confirmed in the 107th Congress. He was confirmed again by the 109th Congress.

Political offices
Preceded by John J. Sullivan; Acting	United States Secretary of Commerce; Acting; 2009	Succeeded by Gary Locke
