= Edwin L. Harper =

American businessman (born 1941)

Assistant to the President for Policy Development
- In office March 1, 1982 – July 31, 1983
- President: Ronald Reagan
- Preceded by: Martin Anderson
- Succeeded by: John A. Svahn

Deputy Director of the Office of Management and Budget
- In office January 1981 – February 1982
- President: Ronald Reagan
- Preceded by: John P. White
- Succeeded by: Joe Wright

Personal details
- Born: November 13, 1941 (age 84) Belleville, Illinois
- Party: Republican

Edwin L. Harper (born November 13, 1941) is an American businessman who served in the Nixon Administration as a section chief in the Domestic Council and in the Reagan Administration as the Deputy Director of the Office of Management and Budget from 1981 to 1982 and as the Assistant to the President for Policy Development from 1982 to 1983. He was previously a professor of the history of the American presidency at Rutgers University.

He graduated from Principia College in 1963, and earned a Ph.D. in political science from the University of Virginia in 1968. He has been vice president of Emerson Electric, executive vice president of the Campbell's, president and CEO of the Association of American Railroads, and chief operating officer of American Security Group.

In 1982, Harper was elected as a fellow of the National Academy of Public Administration.
