= Guy W. Fiske =

American businessman (1924–2021)

3rd United States Deputy Secretary of Commerce
- In office August 24, 1982 – May 14, 1983
- President: Ronald Reagan
- Preceded by: Joseph Robert Wright Jr.
- Succeeded by: Bud Brown

Personal details
- Born: September 28, 1924 Upton, Massachusetts, U.S.
- Died: November 21, 2021 (aged 97) Charlottesville, Virginia, U.S.
- Party: Republican

Guy Wilbur Fiske (September 28, 1924 – November 21, 2021) was an American businessman who served as the United States Deputy Secretary of Commerce from 1982 to 1983. He died in Charlottesville, Virginia on November 21, 2021, at the age of 97.
