= Bud Brown (politician) =

American publisher and politician (1927–2022)

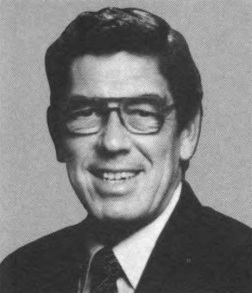
- Brown in 1981

United States Secretary of Commerce
- Acting; July 25, 1987 – October 19, 1987
- President: Ronald Reagan
- Preceded by: Malcolm Baldrige Jr.
- Succeeded by: William Verity Jr.

4th United States Deputy Secretary of Commerce
- In office May 20, 1983 – July 12, 1988
- President: Ronald Reagan
- Preceded by: Guy W. Fiske
- Succeeded by: Donna F. Tuttle

Member of the U.S. House of Representatives from Ohio's 7th district
- In office November 2, 1965 – January 3, 1983
- Preceded by: Clarence J. Brown
- Succeeded by: Mike DeWine

Personal details
- Born: Clarence James Brown Jr. June 18, 1927 Columbus, Ohio, U.S.
- Died: January 26, 2022 (aged 94) Urbana, Ohio, U.S.
- Party: Republican
- Spouse: Joyce Helen Eldridge (m. 1955)
- Children: 4, including Clancy
- Parent: Clarence J. Brown (father)
- Education: Duke University (BA); Harvard University (MBA)

Military service
- Allegiance: United States
- Branch/service: United States Navy
- Years of service: 1944–1946; 1950–1953
- Battles/wars: World War II; Korean War

Clarence James "Bud" Brown Jr. (June 18, 1927 – January 26, 2022) was an American politician and publisher who served as a member of the United States House of Representatives from the 7th District of Ohio, from 1965 to 1983. He also served as the United States Deputy Secretary of Commerce and Acting United States Secretary of Commerce in the Presidency of Ronald Reagan from 1983 to 1988. He was a member of the Republican Party.

== Early life and education ==
Brown was born in Columbus, Ohio, the son of Ethel (née McKinney) and United States Representative Clarence J. Brown. He attended Western High School in Washington, D.C., and graduated from Duke University in 1947 and Harvard Business School, with an M.B.A., in 1949.

== Career ==
Brown served in the United States Navy from 1944 to 1946 (V-12 Navy College Training Program) and again from 1950 to 1953 in the Korean War. Before entering the service, Brown had started working in the newspaper business for his father's family-owned Brown Publishing Company, from youth to 1953, and from 1957 to 2010. In the late 1950s and early 1960s, Brown and his family lived in Urbana, Ohio, 90 miles north of Cincinnati, where the headquarters of the publishing company was based.

Brown served as president from 1965 to 1976, and later as chairman of the board. The company had interests in a wide network of newspapers across the country but, due to the rapidly changing business as a result of technology, it ceased operations in 2010 after 90 years.

== Political career ==
Brown was first elected to the 89th United States Congress, by special election, to fill the vacancy caused by the death of his father Clarence Brown in 1965, and reelected to the eight succeeding Congresses (November 2, 1965, to January 3, 1983). He was not a candidate for reelection to the 98th United States Congress in 1982, as he ran for Governor of Ohio that year, losing to Dick Celeste.

He became involved in Republican Party politics, serving as a delegate to the Republican National Convention in the years 1968, 1972, 1976, and 1984. Ronald Reagan appointed Brown as Deputy Secretary of Commerce and Acting Secretary of Commerce; he served from 1983 to 1988. He was a member of the board of the Overseas Private Investment Corporation from 1988 to 1989, and he was president and chief executive officer of the United States Capitol Historical Society from 1992 to 1999.

== Personal life and death ==
Brown was married to Joyce Helen (née Eldridge) Brown, a conductor, composer and classical pianist. They married on June 11, 1955 in a garden ceremony at the home of Roy Eldridge and Helen Eldridge in the town Franklin, Ohio, his wife's hometown. They had four children: Beth (c. 1957–1964); Clancy Brown, an actor, Cathy, and Roy, who followed his father into newspaper publishing and politics.

Brown died from complications of COVID-19 at home in Urbana, Ohio, on January 26, 2022, at the age of 94.

U.S. House of Representatives
Preceded by Clarence J. Brown	Member of the U.S. House of Representatives from Ohio's 7th congressional district 1965–1983	Succeeded by Mike DeWine
Party political offices
Preceded by Jim Rhodes	Republican nominee for Governor of Ohio; 1982	Succeeded by Jim Rhodes
Political offices
Preceded by Guy W. Fiske	United States Deputy Secretary of Commerce; 1983–1988	Succeeded by Donna F. Tuttle
Preceded by Malcolm Baldrige Jr.	United States Secretary of Commerce; Acting; 1987	Succeeded by William Verity Jr.
