= Paul Dabbar =

American investment banker and government official (born 1967)

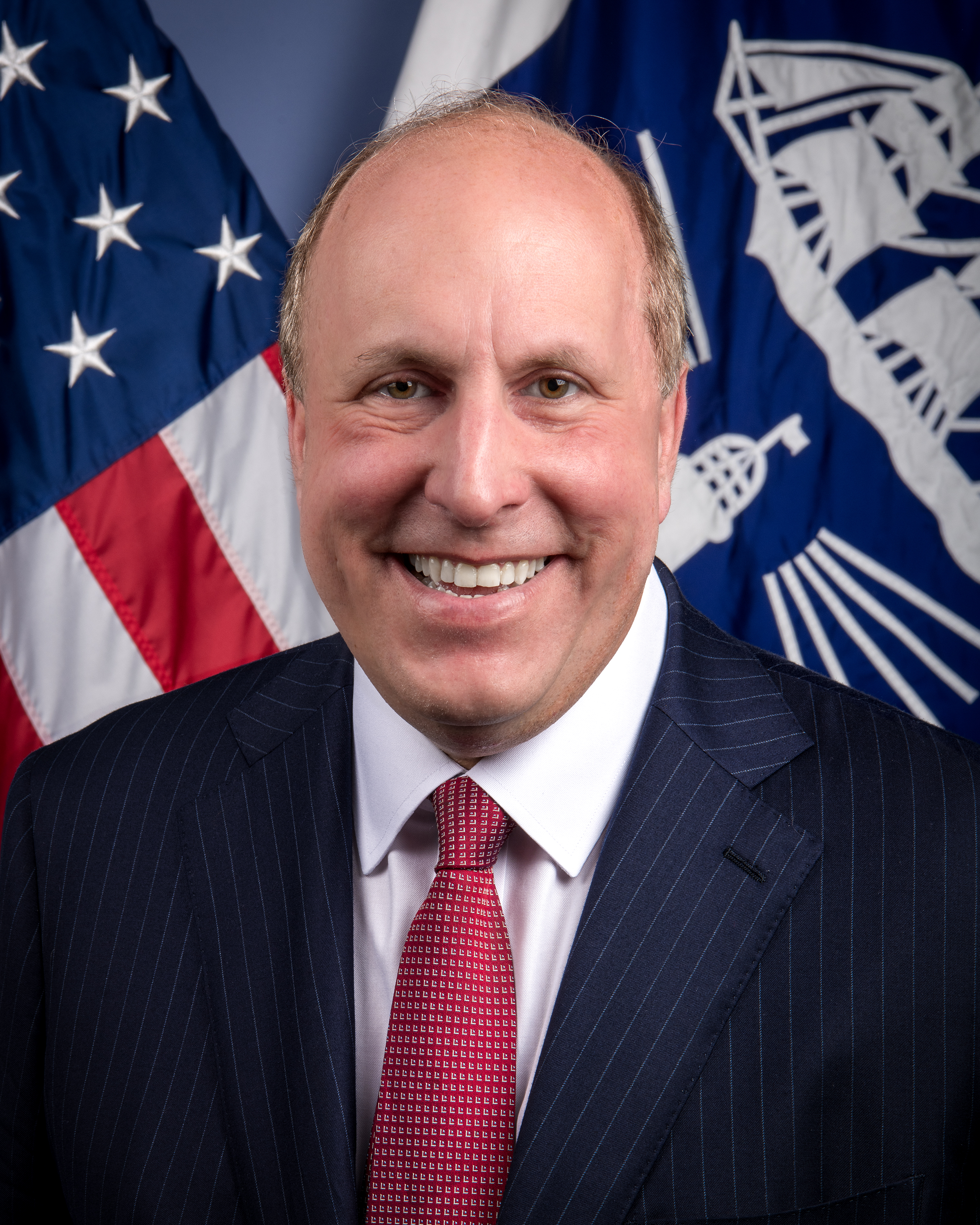
- Official portrait, 2025

19th United States Deputy Secretary of Commerce
- Incumbent
- Assumed office June 26, 2025
- President: Donald Trump
- Preceded by: Don Graves

Under Secretary of Energy for Science
- In office November 7, 2017 – January 20, 2021
- President: Donald Trump
- Preceded by: Franklin Orr
- Succeeded by: Geraldine L. Richmond

Personal details
- Born: July 8, 1967 (age 59)
- Spouse: Andrea Dabbar
- Children: 2
- Education: United States Naval Academy (BS); Columbia University (MBA)

Paul M. Dabbar (born July 8, 1967) is an American businessman and government official who has served as the 19th United States deputy secretary of commerce since 2025. He previously worked as chief executive officer and co-founder of Bohr Quantum Technology, a company developing quantum networking systems. He is also a distinguished visiting fellow at Columbia University's Center on Global Energy Policy.

== Early life and education ==
Dabbar is a graduate of the United States Naval Academy and Columbia Business School. He served as a nuclear submarine officer aboard the USS Pintado (SSN-672) out of Mare Island, California, and Pearl Harbor, Hawaii, including deployment to the North Pole, where he conducted environmental research. He has been a lecturer at the U.S. Naval Academy and has conducted research at the Johns Hopkins Applied Physics Laboratory.

== Career ==
Prior to entering government service, Dabbar was a managing director at J.P. Morgan & Co. He also served on the United States Department of Energy's Environmental Management Advisory Board.

During the first presidency of Donald Trump, he was a United States Department of Energy Under Secretary, serving as Under Secretary of Energy for Science. He served as the Department’s principal advisor on fundamental energy research, energy technologies, and science, driving this mission through programs including nuclear and high energy particle physics, basic energy, advanced computing, fusion, and biological and environmental research, and direct management over a majority of the Department’s national labs. In addition, he managed the environmental and legacy management missions of the Department, addressing the U.S. legacy of nuclear weapons production and government-sponsored nuclear energy research. Dabbar was also the lead for technology commercialization activities for the Department and its 17 national labs.

In February 2025, during the second presidency of Donald Trump, Dabbar was nominated as the United States deputy secretary of commerce. On March 11, his nomination was sent to the Senate before the Senate Committee on Commerce, Science, and Transportation. Dabbar was confirmed by the Senate on June 25, 2025.

Political offices
| Preceded by Jeremy Pelter; Acting | United States Deputy Secretary of Commerce; 2025–present | Incumbent |
