= David A. Sampson =

American government official (born 1957)

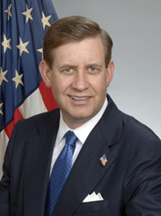
David A. Sampson

David Allan Sampson (born July 2, 1957) is the president and CEO of the American Property Casualty Insurance Association (APCIA), co-headquartered in Washington, DC and Chicago, Illinois. He was born in Washington, Indiana. He joined APCIA in September 2007.

Sampson also is the president of the Independent Statistical Service, Inc. (ISS), a wholly owned subsidiary of APCIA. He serves on the Board of Directors of the Insurance Institute for Highway Safety as well as on the Biden-Harris Administration's Wildland Fire Mitigation and Management Commission.

He was previously United States Deputy Secretary of Commerce and took the oath of office on July 27, 2005. As Deputy Secretary he was the Department of Commerce's chief operating officer and managed a US$6.5 billion budget and 38,000 employees in the 13 operating units. Sampson also served on President George W. Bush's management council and was a member of the board of directors for the Overseas Private Investment Corporation.

Sampson is a B.A. graduate of Lipscomb University and holds the degree of M.Th. from New Orleans Baptist Theological Seminary (NOBTS), being valedictorian in both classes at both institutions. On graduation from Lipscomb and while attending NOBTS, he served as minister of the Westchurch Church of Christ in Hammond, Louisiana. He was the first individual to receive the D.Min. degree at Abilene Christian University. During his studies in Abilene he was minister of the Park Row Church of Christ in Arlington, Texas, prior to selection as chief executive officer of the Arlington Chamber of Commerce. He completed the Program for Senior Executives at Harvard Kennedy School in 1999. Sampson and his family reside in Northern Virginia.

He and his wife Karen have two grown sons. Sampson serves on the vestry of St. Paul’s Episcopal Church in Gainesville, Texas and is an executive committee member of the Traditional Cowboy Arts Association.

== Other appointments ==
- Board of Directors of the Insurance Institute for Highway Safety
- Biden-Harris Administration's Wildland Fire Mitigation and Management Commission
- Member of the U.S. Chamber of Commerce's "Association Committee of 100"
- Assistant Secretary of Commerce for Economic Development
- Chief of the Economic Development Administration
- Chair of the Texas Council on Workforce and Economic Competitiveness
- Vice Chair of the Texas Strategic Economic Development Planning Commission
- President and chief executive officer of the Arlington, Texas Chamber of Commerce

Political offices
Preceded by Theodore Kassinger	United States Deputy Secretary of Commerce; 2005–2007	Succeeded by John J. Sullivan
