= United States Deputy Secretary of Commerce =

United States government position

Deputy Secretary of Commerce of the United States of America
- Seal of the Department of Commerce

- Flag of the deputy secretary of commerce

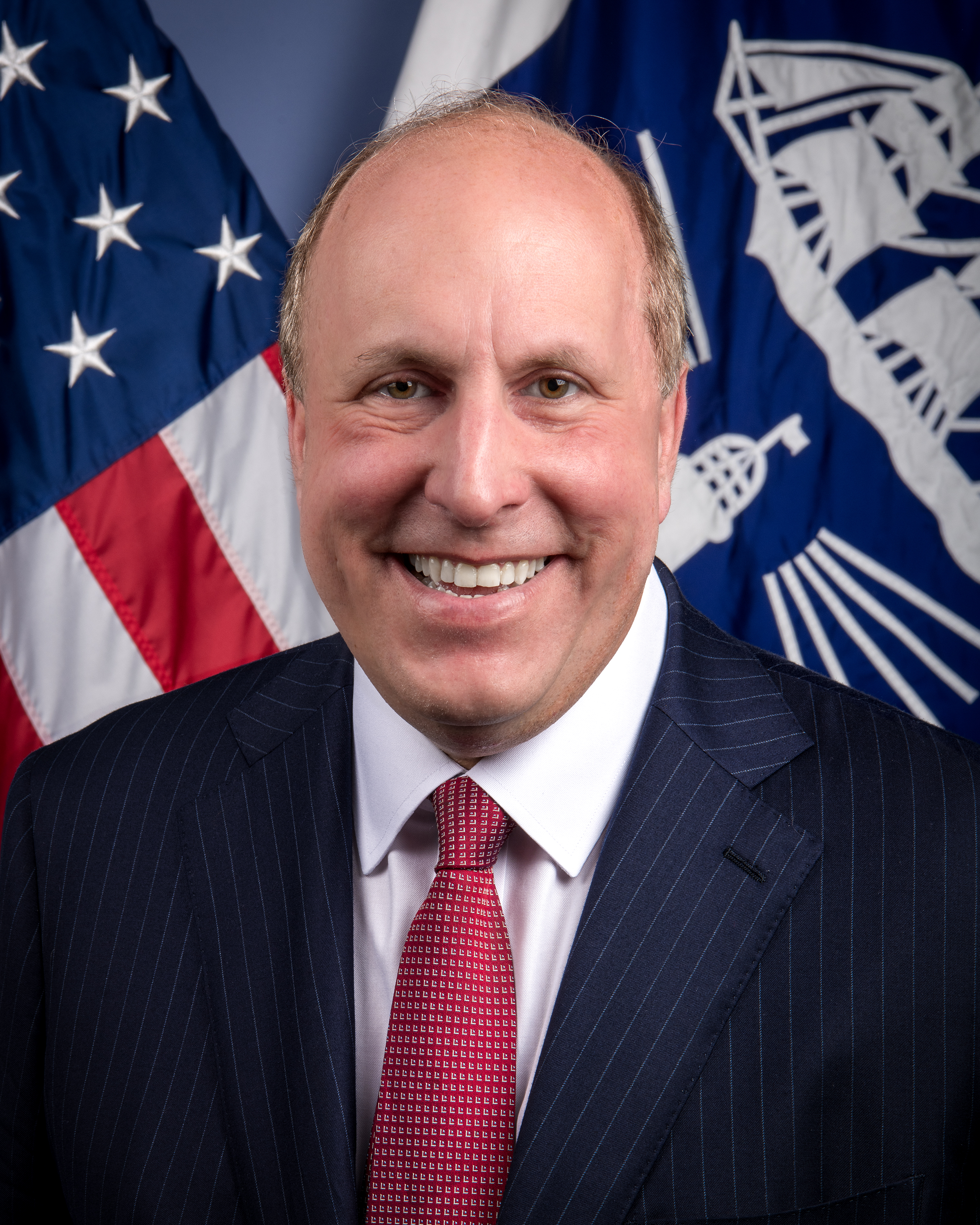
- Incumbent; Paul Dabbar since June 26, 2025
- United States Department of Commerce
- Member of: U.S. Department of Commerce
- Reports to: United States Secretary of Commerce
- Seat: Washington, D.C., U.S.
- Appointer: The president with Senate advice and consent
- Formation: December 13, 1979
- First holder: Luther H. Hodges Jr.
- Website: www.Commerce.gov

The United States deputy secretary of commerce is a high-ranking position within the U.S. Department of Commerce. It was created on December 13, 1979, when President Jimmy Carter sent a letter to the U.S. Senate and nominated Luther H. Hodges Jr., who then currently held the title of under secretary of commerce. The deputy secretary serves as the department’s chief operating officer, with responsibility for the day-to-day management of its approximately $11.4 billion budget, 13 operating units, and 46,000 employees. In that capacity, the deputy secretary is also a member of the President’s Management Council. The most recent deputy secretary was Don Graves, who was sworn in on May 14, 2021 and resigned January 20, 2025.

== History ==
The deputy secretary serves as the principal deputy of the secretary of commerce in all matters affecting the department and performs continuing and special duties as the secretary may assign including, as may be specified by the secretary, the exercise of policy direction and general supervision over operating units not placed under other secretarial officers or other department officials. In addition, the deputy secretary acts as secretary if the secretary has died, resigned, or is otherwise unable to perform the functions and duties of the office of secretary.

== List of deputy secretaries of commerce ==
#	Image	Name	Term began	Term ended	President(s) served under
1		Luther H. Hodges Jr.	September 8, 1980	January 20, 1981	Jimmy Carter
2		Joseph Robert Wright Jr.	January 29, 1981	August 23, 1982	Ronald Reagan
3		Guy W. Fiske	August 24, 1982	May 20, 1983	Ronald Reagan
4		Bud Brown	May 20, 1983	July 12, 1988	Ronald Reagan
5		Donna F. Tuttle	July 12, 1988	January 20, 1989	Ronald Reagan
6		Thomas J. Murrin	February 11, 1989	April 17, 1991	George H. W. Bush
7		Rockwell A. Schnabel	April 25, 1991	January 20, 1993	George H. W. Bush
8		David J. Barram	January 27, 1993	May 14, 1996	Bill Clinton
9		Robert L. Mallett	May 14, 1997	January 20, 2001	Bill Clinton
10		Samuel Bodman	January 22, 2001	July 16, 2004	George W. Bush
11		Theodore Kassinger	August 20, 2004	July 21, 2005	George W. Bush
12		David A. Sampson	July 25, 2005	August 30, 2007	George W. Bush
13		John J. Sullivan	September 1, 2007	March 14, 2008	George W. Bush
13		John J. Sullivan	March 14, 2008	January 20, 2009	George W. Bush
14		Dennis Hightower	August 11, 2009	August 27, 2010	Barack Obama
15		Rebecca Blank	November 28, 2010	March 29, 2012	Barack Obama
15		Rebecca Blank	March 29, 2012	June 1, 2013	Barack Obama
–		Patrick D. Gallagher; Acting	June 1, 2013	July 24, 2014	Barack Obama
16		Bruce H. Andrews	July 24, 2014	January 20, 2017	Barack Obama
17		Karen Dunn Kelley	September 22, 2017	November 28, 2018	Donald Trump
17		Karen Dunn Kelley	November 28, 2018	January 20, 2021	Donald Trump
–		Wynn Coggins; Acting	March 3, 2021	May 14, 2021	Joe Biden
18		Don Graves	May 14, 2021	January 20, 2025	Joe Biden
–		Jeremy Pelter; Acting	February 21, 2025	June 26, 2025	Donald Trump
19		Paul Dabbar	June 26, 2025	Incumbent	Donald Trump
