= Theodore Kassinger =

American government official

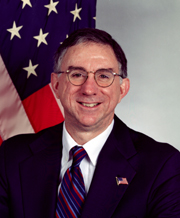
Theodore W. Kassinger

Theodore William Kassinger (born January 26, 1953) is the former Deputy Secretary of the U.S. Department of Commerce from 2004 to 2005 and General Counsel to the U.S. Department of Commerce from 2001 to 2004 during the administration of George W. Bush. He is a native of Atlanta, Georgia.

While serving as Deputy Secretary of Commerce, Kassinger managed a $6.5 billion annual budget, and 38,000 employees, and dealt with matters of international trade and international trade policy. He was also a keynote speaker at the 2005 "U.S.–China Trade: Opportunities and Challenges Conference".

Kassinger grew up in Athens, Georgia, earned a bachelor's degree from the University of Georgia College of Environment & Design in 1974 and a law degree, cum laude, from the University of Georgia School of Law in 1978.

Prior to his government service, Kassinger was a partner at Vinson & Elkins, a multinational law firm, based in Houston, Texas. He practised in the areas of international trade and business law and international dispute resolution. In 2009, he was reported to be an international trade attorney and partner in the Washington DC office of O'Melveny & Myers, LLP.

In 2013, Kassinger was a signatory to an amicus curiae brief submitted to the Supreme Court of the United States in support of same-sex marriage during the Hollingsworth v. Perry case. In 2015, Kassinger was named the Law360's International Trade MVP by helping to obtain crucial government clearance on massive technology deals for IBM Corp. and securing a landmark exception to the U.S. government's nearly 40-year-old ban on crude oil exports. Kassinger has been named a Top National Security Lawyer in DC by the Washingtonian Magazine annually, from 2011 to 2015.

== See also ==
- Vinson & Elkins
- United States Deputy Secretary of Commerce
- O’Melveny & Myers

Political offices
Preceded by Samuel Bodman	United States Deputy Secretary of Commerce; 2004–2005	Succeeded by David Sampson
