= Robert L. Mallett =

American attorney (born 1957)

Robert Mallett
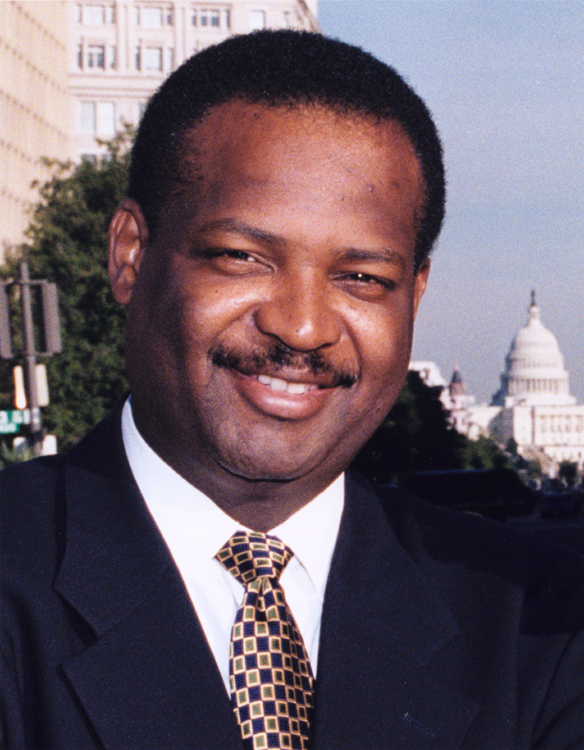

9th United States Deputy Secretary of Commerce
- In office May 14, 1997 – January 20, 2001
- President: Bill Clinton
- Preceded by: David J. Barram
- Succeeded by: Samuel Bodman

Personal details
- Born: April 1, 1957 (age 69) Houston, Texas, U.S.
- Party: Democratic
- Education: Morehouse College (BA); Harvard University (JD)

Robert L. Mallett (born April 1, 1957) is an American attorney who served as the United States Deputy Secretary of Commerce from 1997 to 2001.
