= Federal Vacancies Reform Act of 1998 =

1998 United States law

- Enacted by: the 105th United States Congress

Citations
- Public law: Pub. L. 105–277 (text) (PDF)

Legislative history
- Introduced in the House as Sec. 151 of Division C of the Omnibus Consolidated and Emergency Supplemental Appropriations Act, 1999 (H.R. 4328); Passed the House on October 20, 1998 (333–95); Passed the Senate on October 21, 1998 (65–29); Signed into law by President Bill Clinton on October 21, 1998

United States Supreme Court cases
- NLRB v. SW General, Inc., No. 15-1251, 580 U.S. ___ (2017)

The Federal Vacancies Reform Act of 1998 (commonly called the Vacancies Act) (5 U.S.C. § 3345 et seq.) is a United States federal statute establishing the procedure for filling vacancies in an appointed office of an executive agency of the government before the appointment of a permanent replacement.

The Act allows an incoming President 300 days in which to temporarily and unilaterally fill positions with "acting" officers. After this initial extended period, the offices officially become vacant and the President has 210 days to fill the vacancies. However, provisions in the Act, described as a loophole, allow the president after these periods to assign the "nonexclusive duties" of a vacant position to a person to perform, provided they are not described as "acting". The de facto acting officers can be described as "performing the duties of...", or similar description.

== Provisions ==
The law revises provisions relating to the filling of federal vacancies to authorize the president, if an appointed officer of an executive agency (defined to include the Executive Office of the President and exclude the GAO) dies, resigns, or is otherwise unable to perform office functions, to direct a person who serves in an office for which appointment is required to perform such functions temporarily in an acting capacity, subject to specified time limitations. It retains the requirement that the first assistant of such officer shall perform such functions temporarily in an acting capacity as well, subject to specified time limitations and the limitations described below.

Any action to perform a function of a vacant office by a person filling a vacancy in violation of requirements or by a person who is not filling such vacancy shall have no effect.

=== Eligibility to serve as acting officer ===
Three classes of persons may serve as acting officers:

- by default, "the first assistant to the office" becomes the acting officer.
- the President may direct a person currently serving in a different Senate-confirmed position to serve as acting officer.
- the President can select a senior "officer or employee" of the same executive agency who is equivalent to a GS-15 or above on the federal pay scale, if that employee served in that agency for at least 90 days during the 365 days preceding the end of the previous Senate-confirmed officeholder's service.

It has been argued that the "senior officer or employee" clause may be unconstitutional when applied to principal officers such as department secretaries, because the Appointments Clause of the Constitution requires Senate confirmation for these positions. People supporting this interpretation include Neal Katyal, George Conway, Clarence Thomas, and John Yoo, and people opposing it include David B. Rivkin. An opinion of the Office of Legal Counsel under the George W. Bush administration held that all acting officers are inferior officers and not subject to the requirement for Senate confirmation.

A person nominated to a position may not concurrently serve as an acting officer for that position unless that person is in a "first assistant" position to that office and either has served in that position for at least 90 days, or was appointed to that position through the advice and consent process.

=== Term of office ===
When a vacancy occurs, the position can be filled by an acting officer for 210 days from the date of the vacancy, in addition to the time when a nomination is pending before the Senate. If a first or second nomination is rejected by the Senate or withdrawn, it activates additional 210-day periods from the date of the rejection, but this does not apply to a third or later nominations. However, an incoming President is given 300 days in which to nominate a permanent replacement, instead of the regular 210 days.

If an office remains vacant after 210 days following the rejection, withdrawal, or return of a second presidential appointment nomination, it remains vacant until a person is appointed by the President, by and with the advice and consent of the Senate. In such instance, only the head of an executive agency may perform office functions until such appointment is made in the case of an office other than the office of head of an executive agency.

=== Exceptions ===
The law makes vacancy and time limitation provisions applicable to any affected office for which an advice and consent appointment is required unless:

- another statutory provision expressly supersedes such provisions.
- a statutory provision in effect on this Act's enactment date expressly authorizes the President, a court, or the head of an executive department to designate an officer to perform the functions of a specified office temporarily in an acting capacity or designates an officer to perform functions of a specified office in such temporary acting capacity.
- Recess appointments by the president.

Some agencies are partially exempt from these provisions through other laws that override the Vacancies Reform Act. For example, the Homeland Security Act of 2002 as amended by the National Defense Authorization Act for Fiscal Year 2017 mandates that the under secretary of homeland security for management is third in the line of succession for Secretary of Homeland Security as an explicit exception to the Federal Vacancies Reform Act, and establishes an alternate process by which the Secretary can directly establish a line of succession outside the provisions of the FVRA.

Similarly, the Intelligence Reform and Terrorism Prevention Act of 2004 mandates that the principal deputy director of national intelligence is first in line to the director of national intelligence role. The law applies vacancy provisions of the Federal Judicial Code with respect to the office of the attorney general. Also, the secretary of labor is subject to a different law that does not have a time limit on the term for an acting secretary.

=== Miscellaneous ===
It requires the executive branch departments and agencies to report to Congress and Government Accountability Office (GAO) information about the temporary filling of vacant executive agency positions that require presidential appointment with Senate confirmation. The act requires the Comptroller General report to specified congressional committees, the president, and the Office of Personnel Management if an acting officer is determined to be serving longer than the 210 days (including applicable exceptions established by the act).

One of the additional requirements of the Act was to mandate that federal department and agencies create lines of succession plan in case of disaster or emergency. Though the Act was passed in 1998, many agencies didn't fulfill that requirement until after the September 11, 2001 terrorist attacks. President George W. Bush signed executive orders designating lines of succession in seven key departments within months after the attack. These succession plans do not affect the presidential line of succession, which is governed by the United States Constitution and the Presidential Succession Act.

The law sets forth additional provisions regarding vacancies existing during presidential inaugural transitions, independent establishments, and exceptions to requirements of this Act for certain board members of independent establishments or Government corporations or commissioners of the Federal Energy Regulatory Commission.

== History ==
The law was a revision of the Vacancies Act originally passed in 1868. After the Watergate scandal, other laws that allowed agency heads to delegate functions to subordinates were increasingly used as an alternative to evade the strict rules of the Vacancies Act. By 1998, temporary appointments filled 20% of the 320 positions requiring Senate confirmation.

The Federal Vacancies Reform Act was introduced in the US Senate on June 16, 1998, as S. 2176 of the 105th Congress. The sponsor of the bill was Senator Fred Thompson of Tennessee, then chairman of the Senate Governmental Affairs Committee. Support for the bill was mainly on partisan lines with Republicans supporting the bill and Democrats opposing it. Though Republicans outnumbered Democrats, Democrats filibustered the bill, debating it ad infinitum so it could not be brought to a vote. The cloture vote to end debate failed on September 28, 1998, by a margin of 53–38. West Virginia Senator Robert Byrd was the only Democrat voting in favor of closing debate.

No action was seen in the House on this bill, however the legislation was added to the Omnibus Consolidated and Emergency Supplemental Appropriations Act, 1999 (H.R. 4328), which finished the appropriations process for Congress for Fiscal Year 1999. The omnibus bill passed the House of Representatives on October 20, 1998, by a vote of 333–95. It then passed the Senate the following day on October 21, 1998, by a vote of 65–29. President Bill Clinton signed the bill the same day and it became Pub. L. 105–277 (text) (PDF).

== Criticism ==
In 2001, the Duke Law Journal published an article criticizing the nomination process and the Federal Vacancies Reform Act of 1998. The author, Joshua Stayn, asserts four constitutional problems with the act:

1. The act allows the Senate to confirm or reject people whom the president never officially nominated. The act allows the Senate to treat a president's written notice of intent to nominate as a nomination, despite the fact that the president has yet to and may never nominate the named individual to an advice and consent position. Such treatment of a president's written notice of intent to nominate violates both the "formalist" and "functionalist" Supreme Court decisions on federal appointment issues.
2. The act gives the Senate an impermissible role in making recess appointments. This second constitutional flaw is that it illegitimately interferes with the president's exercise of constitutional authority to make recess appointments.
3. The act encroaches on the president's ability to nominate and control subordinate executive officers. It obligates each agency head to report any vacancy, temporary appointment, or official nomination directly and immediately to Congress, without clearance from the President.
4. The act transfers too much of the Senate's power in the appointment process to the president in the year following a presidential transition. The act authorizes a newly elected president to appoint acting officers to every advice and consent position in the executive branch for up to 300 days after either inauguration day or the date on which the vacancy occurred. The act permits newly elected presidents to engage independently in precisely the kind of favoritism the framers sought to prevent, it is unconstitutional.

=== First Trump administration ===
In 2018, upon the appointment of Matthew Whitaker as Acting Attorney General, some scholars and former government officials (including former Acting Solicitor General of the United States Neal Katyal) argued that the "senior officer or employee" clause may be unconstitutional when applied to principal officers, because the Appointments Clause of the Constitution requires Senate confirmation for these positions.

In mid-2019, the Trump administration installed Ken Cuccinelli as acting director of U.S. Citizenship and Immigration Services and Mark Morgan as acting director of U.S. Immigration and Customs Enforcement by appointing them to newly created "principal deputy director" positions that outranked the preexisting deputy director positions. This was criticized as avoiding Senate scrutiny for these positions through the normal confirmation process. In September 2019, a lawsuit was filed challenging Cuccinelli's asylum directives, partially on the basis that his appointment was invalid. On March 1, 2020, US District Court Judge Randolph Moss, who was appointed by Barack Obama, ruled that Cuccinelli's appointment as USCIS director was illegal because the newly created principal deputy director role did not count as a "first assistant" under the Federal Vacancies Reform Act because he had never served in a subordinate role to any other USCIS official.

=== Biden administration ===
In February 2023, the Government Accountability Office said that three acting executive department heads were serving in violation of the Vacancies Act.

=== Second Trump administration ===
In August 2025, a federal judge determined that a "first assistant may assume a vacant office in an acting capacity under section 3345(a)(1) only at the moment that the vacancy occurs, and that a person who takes the first assistant office during the vacancy's pendency does not take the acting role in the vacant office" and thus Alina Habba's appointment to the role of Acting United States Attorney for the District of New Jersey violated the FVRA.

Less than a year later, in June 2026, another acting appointment sparked criticism. President Trump named Bill Pulte, the director of the Federal Housing Finance Agency, as acting director of national intelligence without Senate confirmation. Pulte has no experience in intelligence, espionage, or national security. Some accused the president of choosing him solely out of loyalty and for his readiness to wield federal power against Trump's political opponents.
