= Diana Josephson =

English-American lawyer and public servant

Diana H. Josephson

Deputy Under Secretary of Commerce for Oceans and Atmosphere
- In office February 26, 1993 – 1997
- President: Bill Clinton
- Preceded by: Ray Kammer
- Succeeded by: Scott Gudes

Under Secretary of Commerce for Oceans and Atmosphere Administrator of the National Oceanic and Atmospheric Administration Acting
- In office February 26, 1993 – May 28, 1993
- President: Bill Clinton
- Preceded by: John Knauss
- Succeeded by: D. James Baker

Principal Deputy Assistant Secretary of the Navy for Installations and Environments
- In office 1997 – September 5, 2000
- President: Bill Clinton
- Preceded by: Cheryl A. Kandaras
- Succeeded by: Geoffrey G. Prosch

Personal details
- Born: October 17, 1936 London, England
- Died: March 6, 2006 (aged 69) Boulder, Colorado
- Education: Somerville College, Oxford; George Washington University
- Occupation: Lawyer, Bureaucrat

Diana Hayward Josephson (October 17, 1936 – March 6, 2006) was the first woman to lead the National Oceanic and Atmospheric Administration (NOAA) when she became the acting Under Secretary of Commerce for Oceans and Atmosphere in 1993.

== Early life ==
Josephson was born in London, England to Robert Hayward and Barbara (Clark) Bailey, Josephson completed a B.A. with honors (1958) and M.A. (1962) at Somerville College, Oxford, then earned a Masters in Comparative Law from George Washington University Law School. She became a member of both the Bar of England and Wales and the District of Columbia Bar. She moved to Washington, D.C., in 1959 and became a naturalized U.S. citizen in 1962. She worked for the Washington law firm of Covington & Burling from 1963 until 1968.

== Career and achievements ==
In 1968 she went to work for the government of the District of Columbia as Deputy Director of the Youth Program Unit for Mayor Walter Washington, coordinating youth programs citywide and then overseeing programs run by 22 agencies. She came to Mayor Washington's attention in 1964 when she was chairman of the Adams Morgan Community Council. By 1970, she was field services director for the Office of Community Services.

In 1974, she ran for the Democratic Party nomination to the Ward 4 seat on the newly created District Council. She resigned from her job in the District government to campaign, and campaigned on a policy of expanded housing. She came in 2nd place in the primary, losing to John A. Wilson by 298 votes (3.74%) in a crowded field.

She moved on to the American Civil Liberties Union for the National Capital Area in 1975 and then joined NOAA in 1978 as the deputy assistant administrator for policy and planning. In 1979, she became the acting deputy assistant administrator for satellites and in that role managed the weather satellite service, worked on NASA and NOAA ground systems and communications, and spearheaded the commercialization of the Landsat satellite system. She left NOAA in 1982.

She then spent time in the aerospace industry in a variety of positions with Martin Marietta Commercial Titan, Inc., Arianespace, Inc., Space America, Inc., and American Science and Technology Corporation and served as a member of the National Research Council's Space Applications Board and as a member of the Board of Directors of the American Astronautical Society. By 1992, she was Martin Marietta Corporation's Director for Mission to Planet Earth Studies.

On February 26, 1993, she was appointed by President Clinton to serve NOAA as Chief Operating Officer and Deputy Undersecretary for Oceans and Atmosphere. When she was appointed, NOAA Director John A. Knauss retired and Josephson became acting director for nearly three months, becoming the first woman to lead the agency. In the following years and during the modernization of the National Weather Service, she led development of a $2 billion annual budget and developed NOAA's first strategic plan. Her contributions led to major improvements in climate forecasting and earned her a NOAA Special Recognition Award for lifetime service. She also served on the President's Interagency Council on Women Representatives, chaired by Hillary Clinton.

In 1997 she went to the U.S. Navy as Principal Deputy Assistant Secretary for Installations and Environments. In that position she had status equivalent to a three-star admiral and was recognized as such aboard naval vessels. Among other things she was responsible for finding an environmentally friendly way to dispose of napalm left from the Vietnam War.

From 2000 to 2004 she was Senior Vice President for Environmental Defense. She reorganized it to bring in new talent and to help create marketing campaigns that increased its endowment by almost 40%. At the time of her death, she was one of five associate directors of the National Center for Atmospheric Research in Boulder. She died on March 6, 2006, from complications of cancer.

Josephson was involved with her partner, Jim Alexander, for 30 years until he died in 2001. They were avid sailors.

== Awards and honors ==
In October 1981, while serving as the Acting Deputy Assistant Administrator for Satellites at NOAA, Josephson was awarded the Department of Commerce Gold Medal for Exceptional Service for "extraordinary contributions to the planning of the U.S. civil operational land remote sensing satellite activities."

Josephson's contributions at the Navy garnered her the Distinguished Public Service Award, the Navy's highest civilian honor.
