= Barry Lee Myers =

American businessman and lawyer (born 1943)

Barry Myers
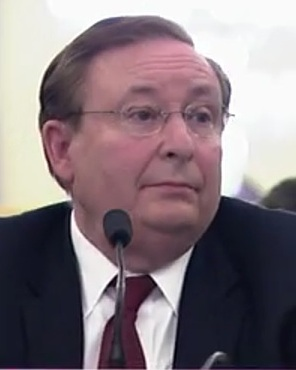
- Myers in 2017

Personal details
- Born: Barry Lee Myers; July 20, 1943 (age 83) Philadelphia, Pennsylvania, U.S.
- Party: Republican
- Education: Pennsylvania State University (BS); Boston University (JD)

Barry Lee Myers is an American attorney and businessman who was the chief executive officer and general counsel for AccuWeather, a privately owned for-profit weather-forecasting company founded by his elder brother, Joel Myers. As an AccuWeather executive, Myers lobbied unsuccessfully to restrict the National Weather Service, a governmental service which provides free weather forecasting, from providing the service and competing with AccuWeather's business.

In 2017, Myers was nominated by President Donald Trump to lead the National Oceanic and Atmospheric Administration (NOAA). His nomination was controversial because he lacked scientific expertise (in contrast to previous NOAA leaders) and because of concern over Myers's financial conflicts of interest. In 2018, an investigation by the Office of Federal Contract Compliance Programs found rampant, pervasive and severe sexual harassment at AccuWeather, and determined that the company, under Myers's leadership, ignored the harassment and retaliated against victims who complained. After two years in the nomination process, on November 21, 2019, Myers withdrew his name from consideration due to health concerns.

== Background ==
Myers is a native of Philadelphia, Pennsylvania. A graduate of Philadelphia's Central High School, he received his B.S. in business administration and economics from Pennsylvania State University in 1967 and his J.D. from Boston University School of Law in 1970. Myers worked for 18 years on the graduate school faculty of Pennsylvania State University's Smeal College of Business.

Before becoming CEO of AccuWeather in September 2007, Myers was the company's executive vice president and general counsel. Since 1990, he has been a member of the board of directors of the American Weather and Climate Industry Association, the weather industry's trade association, serving as the industry's chief federal relations office. Myers was also an advisor to the director of the U.S. National Weather Service at the U.N.'s World Meteorological Organization meetings in Geneva, Switzerland, in 2001 and 2008.

=== Political activities ===
Myers has donated to the presidential campaigns of Donald Trump, Hillary Clinton, and Mitt Romney, and to Rick Santorum's campaigns for U.S. Senate. In 2005, Santorum sponsored a bill entitled the National Weather Service Duties Act of 2005, which failed to pass. Myers saw the National Weather Service as the competition. Thus he publicly supported the bill, as it prohibited the National Weather Service from providing weather information to the general public.

On January 6, 2019, it was announced that Myers had left AccuWeather on January 1, and had sold all of his interest in the company to move into a role leading the National Oceanic and Atmospheric Administration under President Trump.

=== Nomination to National Oceanic and Atmospheric Administration ===
On October 12, 2017, President Donald Trump nominated Myers to head the National Oceanic and Atmospheric Administration. Myers said he would liquidate his holdings in the family-owned company. His brothers would remain as the president, chairman of the board and chief operating officer of AccuWeather. At his confirmation hearing, opponents of his confirmation pointed out that the family connection would still represent a major conflict of interest.

Myers was selected for the Under Secretary of Commerce for Oceans and Atmosphere position by Commerce Secretary Wilbur Ross. Myers's deputies would include the Assistant Secretary for Oceans and Atmosphere Timothy Gallaudet, a Navy Rear Admiral with a doctorate in oceanography and the Assistant Secretary for Environmental Observation and Prediction, Neil Jacobs, who was chief atmospheric scientist at the Panasonic Avionics Corporation. If confirmed, Myers would have been the second NOAA administrator without a science degree, and the first since Richard A. Frank left office in 1981. The agency employees' labor union opposed Myers nomination, citing his support of the Santorum bill.

His nomination was returned to President Trump by the Senate on January 3, 2018, resubmitted on January 8, 2018, returned on January 3, 2019, and resubmitted on January 16, 2019. The nomination was withdrawn by President Trump on December 2, 2019.

Last Week Tonight, John Oliver's HBO show, produced a segment on Myers's nomination.
