= AccuWeather Network =

American cable and satellite TV channel

- Country: United States
- Broadcast area: Nationwide (available in select markets)
- Headquarters: State College, Pennsylvania, U.S.

Programming
- Language: English
- Picture format: 1080i (HDTV); 480i (SDTV)

Ownership
- Owner: AccuWeather
- Sister channels: The Local AccuWeather Channel

History
- Launched: March 10, 2015; 11 years ago

Links
- Website: www.getaccuweather.tv

Availability

Streaming media
- Service(s): DirecTV Stream, FuboTV, Philo

The AccuWeather Network is an American cable and satellite television network launched, operated and owned by AccuWeather. The network broadcasts live and pre-recorded national and regional weather forecasts, analysis of ongoing weather events, and weather-related news. The network's studio and master control facilities are based at AccuWeather's headquarters in State College, Pennsylvania.

== History ==
AccuWeather, which for many years had distributed and continues to distribute its forecast content to participating broadcast television stations around the United States, launched its first 24-hour television venture in 2007, with the launch of The Local AccuWeather Channel, a network distributed via the digital subchannels of various commercial (and in one case, non-commercial) stations, primarily featuring pre-recorded short-form local, regional, and national forecast segments. The Local AccuWeather Channel, which peaked in distribution in the early 2010s, remains available on a small and declining number of stations.

On January 13, 2014, AccuWeather announced that it would launch a new national weather channel, tentatively named "AccuWeather Channel", in the third quarter of that year. The channel aimed to focus its programming on forecasts and other weather information, designed as an alternative to The Weather Channel, which, since its purchase by NBCUniversal, Bain Capital, and The Blackstone Group in 2008, shifted towards a mix of forecasts and reality series which had a tenuous or limited connection to weather.

Plans to form a competing network began to be developed by AccuWeather in 2013; however, the company did not intend to publicly announce the launch until later the following year, with founder and president Dr. Joel N. Myers citing the decision to announce the launch earlier based on the limited "availability of quality forecasts on TV", and a then-ongoing carriage dispute between The Weather Channel and satellite provider DirecTV to make notice of the new service. Barry Lee Myers, then chief executive officer of AccuWeather, cited the company's decision to start the new channel as it had already offered "coverage in virtually every other medium" and, because of its existing digital presence, created a channel that would have the "look and feel of a digital device". AccuWeather Network was announced as a multi-platform service that would be streamed on the internet and mobile websites of AccuWeather and on its affiliate partners (which did not occur upon its initial launch), in addition to cable and satellite distribution. The channel's launch was eventually delayed until the channel was able to secure carriage on pay television providers.

The network was launched on March 10, 2015, with Verizon Fios as the first provider to offer the new network; Verizon Fios began carrying AccuWeather Network on channels 119 (in standard definition) and 619 (in high definition) after the provider's carriage agreement with The Weather Channel (which was replaced by the AccuWeather Network in its respective channel slots) and its sister network Weatherscan (itself initially replaced on the provider by a widget featuring forecast content sourced from WeatherBug) expired without a renewal. Ironically, Verizon's decision to replace The Weather Channel with AccuWeather Network was despite its claim that the former's removal was a long-term business decision based on the increasing consumer availability of weather information on digital media (via the Internet and mobile devices), although the need for weather coverage without filler programming to pad periods when no significant weather was occurring was also cited.

On July 11, 2018, AccuWeather Network, following a similar move of NY1 8 months earlier, launched three programming blocks on weekdays: "AccuWeather AM" with Bernie Rayno and Laura Velasquez from 6:00 a.m. to 11:00 a.m.; "AccuWeather Early PM" with Geoff Cornish and Brittany Boyer from 3:00 p.m. to 9:00 p.m., and "AccuWeather PM" with Paul Williams and Melissa Constanzer from 9:00 p.m. to 6:00 a.m. All of the programmes follow the all-live nature, thus allow for faster reaction when significant weather events break, following criticism of viewers that the network was too slow to switch to live wall-to-wall coverage during these events, due to its mostly pre-recorded format. Mid-morning and weekend hours remain unbranded and still maintain the live-and-recorded nature.

On August 1, 2018, DirecTV replaced WeatherNation TV (which had been on the service since December 2013) with the AccuWeather Network, thus becoming the second provider to offer the latter network. The AccuWeather Network is carried on DirecTV channel 361 (in SD and HD).

On December 8, 2020, Charter Spectrum announced it had entered an agreement with AccuWeather Network to launch the AccuWeather Network on Spectrum TV Select lineups nationwide in January 2021. The network will provide a national programming feed with regionalized local weather data for most Spectrum service areas.

In January 2021, programming lineups were slightly revamped, now dividing broadcast day into four parts. Early airs from 5:00 a.m. to 11:00 a.m. ET, followed by All Day until 4:00 p.m. ET, Ahead until 9:00 p.m. ET and All Night for the rest of the night. On Saturdays and Sundays, Weekend airs throughout the entire day. Streaming service Philo and fuboTV also carry the AccuWeather Network.

== Programming ==
AccuWeather Network provides national, regional, and local weather forecasts as well as specialty forecasts, meteorological analysis, severe weather information and weather-related feature segments. They are presented by on-camera personalities and meteorologists employed by AccuWeather to provide forecasts for the company's website and the now-defunct Local AccuWeather Channel broadcast service.

AccuWeather Network also displays weather information on a L-shaped ticker placed at the lower and left-sides of the TV screen, which is visible at all times. The left top two-thirds of the ticker cycles between current weather conditions (including sky condition, actual and RealFeel (or apparent) temperatures, wind speed/direction and ultraviolet indexes), two-hour MinuteCasts and a loop of Doppler weather radar imagery over the course of one hour, while the bottom one-third of that area displays a rundown of upcoming forecast locations. The bottom of the ticker displays six-hour, two-day and five-day forecasts (showing the forecasted sky conditions and temperatures) for the city being referred to in the screen's left side. On the national feed, the bottom of the ticker displays MinuteCast & 24-hour forecasts for five major state capital cities in six individual regions (Southeast, Northwest, Southwest, North Central, South Central & Northeast), while the L-bar displays Doppler weather radar imagery in UTC timezone and current conditions for those cities.

In May 2020, AccuWeather Network aired a Hurricane Town Hall to address the hurricane season and such essentials such as preparation and response during the COVID-19 pandemic, among other hurricane-related issues in “AccuWeatherReady: 2020 Hurricane Season during COVID-19.” It was the Network's first one-hour special. The Network followed up with a second Hurricane Town Hall in June 2021. Featured guests and experts viewers will hear from include AccuWeather's Lead Hurricane Forecaster Dan Kottlowski; Director of the National Hurricane Center Ken Graham; New Orleans Mayor LaToya Cantrell; Hurricane Katrina incident commander Col. Terry Ebbert; and Director of the New Orleans Office of Homeland Security and Emergency Management Collin Arnold.

=== Local forecasts ===
At launch, all Verizon FiOS customers were provided with the same feed that focused on the cities where FiOS provides service, which is mostly across the Northeastern U.S.

Regional feeds of the network were launched for FiOS customers in the Northeast on September 10, 2015. One feed covers FiOS customers in the Washington metropolitan area. The other feed covers customers in the New York tri-state area, Rhode Island, and Massachusetts.

Local forecasts aired on AccuWeather Network (similar in format to The Weather Channel's "Local on the 8s") are generated by a computer unit installed at the provider's headend, which inserts data over the channel's national feed. The localized segments provide current weather observations, and high and low temperatures observed since 12:00 a.m. local time for a given city; MinuteCast forecasts, incremental forecasts (pioneered by AccuWeather, Inc.) for the next hour; at-a-glance forecasts for the current day and the day after; extended forecasts (which, in addition to the traditional seven-day outlooks, includes 10-, 15-, 25-, 30- and 45-day forecasts, longer-term forecasts also pioneered by AccuWeather); almanacs (showing temperature averages and extremes for the current date, and recorded precipitation for the past 24 hours, historical maximum precipitation for the date, and month-to-date and departure from average precipitation in the area); and computer models showing forecasted sky conditions and temperatures in the surrounding metropolitan area and region for the succeeding 24- to 36-hour period.

== Location and team ==
The channel's headquarters and studios are at AccuWeather in State College, Pennsylvania.

=== Broadcaster Meteorologists ===
- Bernie Rayno
- Geoff Cornish (formerly of WICU-TV, WTVG, WTVQ-DT and KOAM-TV)
- Ariella Scalese
- Anna Azallion
- Damien Lodes

=== Reporters ===
- Tony Laubach, Meteorologist (formerly of KAKE-TV, WSIL-TV, and KMGH)
- Bill Wadell (formerly of WJAC-TV, WNEP-TV, WSYX and WFXR)
- Ali Reed
- Leslie Hudson

=== Former personalities ===
- Marvin Gómez (now at WCAU)
- Kim Leoffler (now at WAGA-TV)
- Chris Nallan (now at WTAJ-TV)
- Jessica Pash
- Michelle Rotella (now at WCAU)
- Adam Del Rosso (now at WCCO-TV)
- Kevin Coskren
- Justin Povick
- Kristina Shalhoup
- Bree Guy
- Michelle Mcleod
- Melissa Constanzer

== See also ==
- The Weather Channel
- Weatherscan
- WeatherNation TV
