= Pearson Hall =

Pearson Hall may refer to:

- Pearson PLC
- Pearson Hall (Miami University) in Ohio, United States
- Pearson Hall, Sonning, England
