= Miami Field =

Multi-purpose stadium in Ohio, United States

Coordinates: 39.511044°N 84.731251°W

- Interactive map of Miami Field
- Capacity: 7,240 (1928); 14,800 (1982)

Construction
- Opened: 1896
- Closed: 1982

Tenant
- Miami RedHawks (NCAA) (1896–1982)

Miami Field was a multi-purpose stadium at Miami University in Oxford, Ohio.

== History ==
Miami Field opened in 1896 as Athletic Park. It was home to the Redskins college football team prior to Yager Stadium opening in 1983.

The stadium had a capacity of 7,240 by 1928. When it closed in 1982, capacity was 14,800. At that time, it was the second oldest college football stadium after Franklin Field. Almost immediately upon Miami Field being razed, new campus buildings were constructed on the site, the largest of which being Pearson Hall.

In the final configuration, the stands were all metal, and were built above ground level. The playing field was oriented north-south. North Patterson Avenue ran parallel to and behind the visitor side stands, which were located on the eastern side of the stadium. The intersection of High Street (US 27) and Patterson Avenue was at the south east corner of the stadium, with High Street being perpendicular to the playing field.

When Yager Stadium was constructed, the old Miami Field home side stands were reused as the Yager Stadium visitor side stands, whilst the visitor side stands were divided in two, and used as the endzone seats. These remained as a part of Yager Stadium until replaced in the early 2000s when Yager was renovated. Brick ticket booths were also moved to Yager Stadium and the scoreboard with its clock-like hands was given to the College Football Hall of Fame for display in its museum.

- - Aerial View
