= William Eugene Evans =

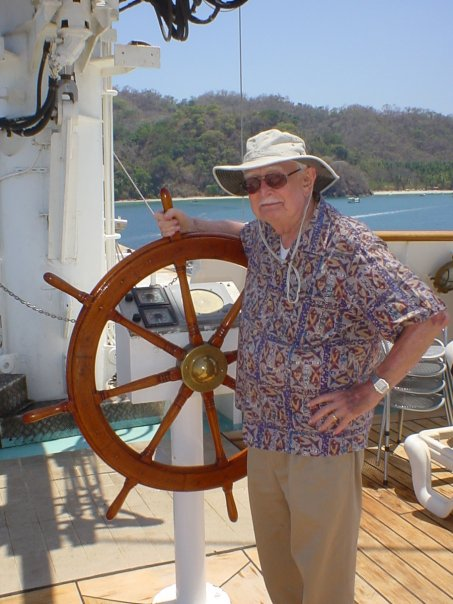
- Evans (2009)

5th Under Secretary of Commerce for Oceans and Atmosphere 5th Administrator of the National Oceanic and Atmospheric Administration
- In office March 31, 1988 – August 7, 1989
- President: Ronald Reagan; George H. W. Bush
- Preceded by: Anthony J. Calio
- Succeeded by: John A. Knauss

Chairman of the Marine Mammal Commission
- In office 1983–1986
- Preceded by: James C. Nofziger

Personal details
- Born: October 10, 1930 Elkhart, Indiana
- Died: October 11, 2010 (aged 80) Bryan, Texas
- Education: Bowling Green State University; Ohio State University; UCLA
- Occupation: Marine Scientist

Military service
- Branch/service: Ohio National Guard; United States Army
- Years of service: 1948-1949; 1953-1954 (reserve); 1954-1956 (active)
- Rank: Lieutenant

Dr. William Eugene Evans (October 10, 1930 – October 11, 2010) was a world renowned marine mammal acoustician and ecologist and the fifth Administrator of the National Oceanic and Atmospheric Administration (NOAA).

== Early life ==
William Eugene Evans was born in Elkhart, Indiana on October 10, 1930. He grew up in rural areas, but was able to frequently visit the museums in and around Chicago, which fostered an interest in science. His interest in marine life was locked in by circus displays which brought to his home town in successive years a preserved fin whale and a preserved sperm whale. At 18, he joined the Ohio National Guard so that he could finish high school without being drafted to Korea. Though he did miss his graduation when his unit was activated and he was sent to Camp Polk in Louisiana, but he finished his service before he ever went to Korea. Shortly thereafter he attended Bowling Green State University where he was in the Reserve Officers' Training Corps. In December 1953, he earned a Bachelor of Science degree in speech pathology/audiology with a double major in dramatic arts and then went to his final ROTC training at Fort Sill. Afterward, he was commissioned as 2nd Lieutenant in the Army Reserves as a field artillery officer. From 1953 to 1954, he was a research assistant in experimental audiology at the Columbus State School for Ohio State University Research Foundation.

Following his ROTC training, he enrolled at Ohio State University in Columbus, Ohio, and earned a Master's of Science degree in audiology and psychoacoustics from Ohio State in December 1954. Immediately afterward, he went to Fort Knox where he served in the 276th Armored Field Artillery Battalion training officers and enlisted men in the use of artillery weapons. In 1956, when his service was over, he turned down a chance to go to flight school so that he could move closer to his family in California.

== Research ==
When he completed his military service, he was hired by Douglas Aircraft Company in California as a laboratory research analyst in bioacoustics studying the effect of jet engine noise on non-human animals. When the government wanted someone to study the electrocardiogram readings of whales, Evans was sent to Baja California to learn about gray whales. He left Douglas in 1959 and got a job as the senior scientist and project leader of bioacoustic at Lockheed Aircraft in Burbank, CA.

In 1964, he left Lockheed and worked part-time on an NIH grant with Prof. K.S. Norris, as a grad student and part-time with Naval Missile Center Marine Mammal Laboratory, where he became one of the first scientists to work with the United States Navy's Marine Mammal Program. He studied marine mammal communication and echolocation and analyzed dolphins' unique whistle vocalizations. During that time he served on the Coast Guard Icebreaker, Polar Star, studying dolphin echolocation. He helped to create a special research platform for recording and observing dolphins underwater called "Sea See" and worked on the design of the semi-submersible vehicle, the RVSea See. He participated in events for NATO in 1966. In 1966 he was promoted to senior scientist and associate head of the Marine Bio-Medical Division, marine mammal research at the Naval Undersea Center in Point Mugu, CA, and San Diego, CA. During that time he participated in the International Conference on the Biology of Whales in 1971, the first USSR-US Cooperative Environmental Research Program, and even served as a visiting scientist on a Soviet research vessel. From 1972 to 1974, he was an advance study fellow and visiting scientist for the National Marine Fisheries Service at the Southwest Fisheries Center in La Jolla, CA.

He left Lockheed to undertake a Ph.D. at the University of California at Los Angeles, earning his doctorate in December 1975. During this time and after, from 1974 to 1976, he was head of the bioanalysis group, underseas sciences department, at the Naval Ocean Systems Center. He authored more than 60 published technical papers and co-authored several books. He held at least three patents for marine systems, including a device for tagging and tracking marine animals.

He served as the first director of the Hubbs-Sea World Research Institute in San Diego from 1977 to 1986. There he worked on remote sensing studies for use in oceanography and hosted notables like Jacques Cousteau and then-governor Ronald Reagan.

== Government Service ==
In 1983, Evans was appointed by President Ronald Reagan to serve as chairman of the Marine Mammal Commission for two years, and his term was extended until 1986. In 1986, he became the Assistant Administrator for Fisheries at the National Oceanic and Atmospheric Administration (NOAA) where he negotiated several global environmental and fisheries agreements. In 1988 was appointed the first Undersecretary of Commerce for Oceans and Atmosphere (NOAA), previously that position had been known as the Administrator of NOAA. That same year he was appointed as the U.S. commissioner to the International Whaling Commission. It was during his time at NOAA that the Exxon Valdez oil spill occurred and because the Secretary of Commerce had to recuse himself, Evans became acting Secretary for all issues dealing with the Valdez. It was the change in the nature of his job from one of science to legal and cleanup efforts that led him to retire from NOAA in late 1989.

== Academia ==
Following his retirement from NOAA, he went into academia and became the Dean of the Maritime College, president of the Texas Institute of Oceanography, and Professor of Marine Biology at Texas A&M University at Galveston. He was later an adjunct professor of biology at the University of Notre Dame. From 2003 till his retirement in 2009, he was Editor in Chief of the American Midland Naturalist.

Evans researched the history of international environmental policy and the conservation of threatened and endangered species. He wrote several books including an autobiography entitled "50 Years of Flukes and Flippers." Evans received an honorary doctorate of public service form BGSU in 1988.

He married Phyllis Jean Roberts, whom he met in college, on December 27, 1952, in Dayton, OH and they remained married until his death in 2010. Together they had two children, Jonathan Arthur; born May 13, 1955, and Timothy Justus; born July 13, 1956, both in Fort Knox, Ky. He died in 2010 at the age of 80 in Bryan, Texas.

Government offices
Preceded by Anthony J. Calio	5th Administrator of the National Oceanic and Atmospheric Administration; 1988 – 1989	Succeeded by John A. Knauss
