= Paul G. Risser =

American ecologist and academic (1939–2014)

7th Chancellor of the Oklahoma State System of Higher Education
- In office 2002–2006

13th President of Oregon State University
- In office 1996–2002
- Preceded by: John V. Byrne
- Succeeded by: Edward John Ray

President of Miami University
- In office 1993–1996
- Preceded by: Paul G. Pearson
- Succeeded by: James C. Garland

Personal details
- Born: September 14, 1939 Blackwell, Oklahoma
- Died: July 10, 2014 (aged 74) Norman, Oklahoma
- Education: Grinnell College; University of Wisconsin–Madison
- Profession: educator, ecologist

Paul Gillan Risser (September 14, 1939 – July 10, 2014) was an American ecologist and academic from Oklahoma. He served as president of Miami University and Oregon State University before becoming chancellor of the Oklahoma State System of Higher Education.

== Early life ==
Risser was born in Blackwell in north-central Oklahoma on September 14, 1939. He grew up there, graduating from Blackwell High School. After graduating with a bachelor's degree from Iowa's Grinnell College in biology in 1961, he then enrolled at the University of Wisconsin in Madison. At Wisconsin he earned a masters in botany in 1965 followed by a PhD. in 1967 in botany and soils.

== Career ==
In 1967, Risser joined the faculty of the University of Oklahoma in Norman, where he remained until 1981. There he was a professor of botany, and later chairman of his department. Risser moved to the University of Illinois at Urbana–Champaign in 1981 where he served as Chief of the Illinois Natural History Survey. In 1986 he moved to the University of New Mexico where he was provost and later the vice president for academic affairs. His next post came at Miami University in Oxford, Ohio, where he served as president from 1993 to 1996.

In 1996, Risser became the 13th president of Oregon State University in Corvallis, where he remained until 2002. At Oregon State he oversaw construction of the CH2M-Hill Alumni Center, Halsell Hall, and Richardson Hall, as well as an expansion in enrollment and The Valley Library. The school also added a satellite campus in Bend, OSU-Cascades. Risser also led the effort to improve the College of Engineering along with athletics, with the football team recording its first winning season in 28 years during his tenure. He left OSU to become chancellor of the Oklahoma State System of Higher Education in his home state, taking office on January 6, 2003 to replace Hans Brisch.

== Later life and death ==
In 2006, he left the chancellor's office. He then served as the Smithsonian National Museum of Natural History's acting director and the executive director of EDGE, Oklahoma's economic development agency. Risser died on July 10, 2014, at the age of 74 in Norman. He was survived by his wife, four sons and two step-daughters.

Academic offices
| Preceded by Paul G. Pearson | President of Miami University; 1993–1996 | Succeeded by James C. Garland |
| Preceded by John V. Byrne | President of Oregon State University; 1996–2002 | Succeeded by Edward John Ray |
| Preceded by Hans Brisch | Chancellor of the Oklahoma State System of Higher Education; 2002–2006 | Succeeded by Glen D. Johnson, Jr. |
