= National Weather Service Duties Act of 2005 =

The National Weather Service Duties Act of 2005 (S. 786) was a legislative proposal forwarded in April 2005 by United States Senator Rick Santorum (R-PA) to curtail perceived government competition with commercial weather services from the National Weather Service. Though the wording of the bill was generally considered unclear, the general consensus among observers was that its effect would be to eliminate public dissemination of National Weather Service data and forecasts except in case of severe weather alerts. The bill attracted no cosponsors in the Senate and eventually died in committee, and was roundly criticized by the general public for threatening to move taxpayer-funded data (currently made available for free) to commercial for-profit channels (i.e. behind a pay wall). The bill had very few supporters outside the commercial weather industry.

In the wake of the bill's introduction, Santorum was accused of political impropriety and influence peddling because Joel Myers, the head of Pennsylvania-based AccuWeather and one of Santorum's constituents, was also a Santorum campaign contributor. Myers and his brother, the executive vice president, donated over $11,000 to Santorum's political campaigns, including $2,000 two days before Santorum introduced the bill.

In September 2005, while the bill was still in committee, Santorum criticized the National Weather Service's forecasting of Hurricane Katrina, claiming that more lives could have been saved if the NWS's operation focused on severe weather. However, both public and professional opinion held that the NWS's forecasting had in fact been substantially better than most other sources, and Santorum's comment was largely ignored.
