= Anthony J. Calio =

4th Under Secretary of Commerce for Oceans and Atmosphere 4th Administrator of the National Oceanic and Atmospheric Administration
- In office October 7, 1985 – September 15, 1987
- President: Ronald Reagan
- Preceded by: John V. Byrne
- Succeeded by: William Eugene Evans
- In office Acting: November 15, 1984 – October 7, 1985

Deputy Administrator of the National Oceanic and Atmospheric Administration
- In office December 11, 1981 – October 7, 1985
- Preceded by: James P. Walsh
- Succeeded by: James Curtis Mack II

Personal details
- Born: October 27, 1929 Philadelphia, Pennsylvania
- Died: January 14, 2012 (aged 82) Whidbey Island, Washington
- Party: Republican
- Education: University of Pennsylvania; Carnegie Institute of Technology; Stanford University
- Occupation: Physicist

Military service
- Branch/service: U.S. Army
- Unit: Chemical Corps
- Battles/wars: Korean War

Anthony John Calio (October 27, 1929 – January 14, 2012) was an American physicist, businessman, senior executive of NASA and the fourth Administrator of National Oceanic and Atmospheric Administration (NOAA).

== Early life ==
Anthony (Tony) Calio, was born in Philadelphia, Pennsylvania on October 27, 1929. He graduated from Northeast High School (Philadelphia) in 1947, and earned a BS degree in physics from the University of Pennsylvania in 1953 and then stayed for some postgraduate study. He served in the Army Chemical Corps at Fort Detrick, Maryland, during the Korean War from 1954 to 1956.

== Career ==
Calio started his career in 1956 in the nuclear power industry with Westinghouse in Pittsburgh, Pennsylvania where he was part of the team that developed and built the first land-based nuclear power reactor in Shippingport, Pennsylvania. In 1959 he left Westinghouse and did graduate work in physics at the Carnegie Institute of Technology. Later that same year, he took a job as Chief of the Nuclear Physics Section at American Machine and Foundry Company in Alexandria, Virginia. In 1961, he co-founded the Mount Vernon Research Company in Mount Vernon, Virginia, serving as executive vice president and manager of operations. He helped build a business making scientific instrumentation for the first rocket programs and vacuum chambers for spacecraft testing. They sold the business in 1963 and Calio went to work for the National Aeronautics and Space Administration (NASA).

Calio then spent 18 years with NASA. He was first hired as part of the Electronics Research Task Group in the NASA Headquarters Office of Advanced Research and Technology. In 1964, he was appointed Chief of Research and Engineering at the newly established Electronics Research Center in Boston. The next year he returned to NASA headquarters to work for the Manned Space Science Division as the Chief of the Instrumentation and Systems Integration Branch. In 1967 he became the Assistant Director of Planetary Programs in the Office of Space Science Applications. He joined the Apollo Program Office at the Johnson Space Center in 1968, and worked as the Deputy Director of the Science and Applications Directorate. He became the director in 1969 and assumed responsibility for managing all scientific aspects of the Apollo and Skylab programs, a job he would continue until 1975. During that time he was one of the people responsible for implementing and directing all aspects of the program's science activities for all missions from Apollo 7 through Apollo 17, work for which he was awarded an honorary doctorate from Washington University in St. Louis in 1974. After completing a Sloan Fellowship at Stanford University Graduate School of Business in 1975 and earning an MBA, he returned to NASA Headquarters, where he pioneered early applications of civil remote sensing from space while serving as the Deputy Associate Administrator for Space Science. From 1977 to 1981, he was the Associate Administrator for Space and Terrestrial Applications. He earned the NASA Exceptional Service Medal and the NASA Group Achievement Award in 1969; the Apollo Achievement Award in 1970; the NASA Exceptional Scientific Achievement Medal in 1971; the Lunar Science Team Award in 1973 and the NASA Distinguished Service Medal in 1973 and 1981.

President Reagan appointed Calio the Deputy Administrator of the National Oceanic and Atmospheric Administration (NOAA) in 1981. He became the Acting Administrator of NOAA in 1984 and the Administrator in 1985, serving until 1987. He served as the United States Whaling Commissioner, and helped to gain approval for the international moratorium on commercial whaling in 1986.

While at NOAA, Administrator Calio led the effort to modernize NOAA's National Weather Service, and to develop the NEXRAD radar and the Advanced Weather Interactive Processing System for the 90's (AWIPS 90), the first program of its kind to bring operational satellite data to the forecasting community.

Administrator Calio supported the creation of a domestic policy council working group which would look at how the nation could better understand and address changing climate and large-scale environmental change. His work resulted in the creation of the White House Office of Science and Technology Policy's NSTC Committee on Environment, Natural Resources and Sustainability, which recommended the establishment of the interagency U.S. Global Change Research Program.

Calio developed NOAA's Climate and Global Change Program which proceeded to conduct extensive climate research. He also attempted to improve NOAA's geostationary and polar-orbiting satellites program, including the GOES satellites that were launched in the 1990s.

After leaving NOAA, Calio was senior vice president of the Planning Research Corporation in McLean, Virginia, for four years. He joined Hughes Aircraft Company in 1991, where he assisted in the creation of an information technology subsidiary. He was an executive vice president there from 1991 to 1995, senior vice president and president of Space Systems from 1996 to 1997 and then president of Hughes Information Technology Corporation, Space Systems Division until his retirement. After Raytheon purchased the Hughes aerospace and defense businesses, he stayed on to facilitate the transition to the new organization. He retired from Raytheon in January 1999.

== Personal life ==
Calio married Betty Delp in 1951, and they had four daughters. His marriages to Delp and Cheryll Madison, whom he married in 1971, ended in divorce. He met Jenanne Murphy while working for Hughes. They were married in June 2000 and retired to Whidbey Island, Washington that year.

Calio died of congestive heart failure and lung cancer at his home on Whidbey Island on January 14, 2012, and was buried at sea.

Government offices
Preceded by John V. Byrne	4th Administrator of the National Oceanic and Atmospheric Administration; 1985–1987	Succeeded by William Eugene Evans
