= Paul G. Pearson =

American academic

President of Miami University
- In office 1981–1992
- Preceded by: Phillip R. Shriver
- Succeeded by: Paul G. Risser

Personal details
- Born: December 5, 1926 Lake Worth, Florida, US
- Died: August 12, 2000 (aged 73) Oxford, Ohio, US
- Spouse: Winifred Pearson
- Education: University of Florida
- Profession: Professor

Paul Guy Pearson (December 5, 1926 – August 12, 2000) was an American academic, who served as president of Miami University and as acting president of Rutgers University. He came to Miami University after serving as executive vice president at Rutgers.

== Biography ==
Pearson was born and educated in Lake Worth, Florida on December 5, 1926. Dr. Pearson received his bachelor's degree in 1949, Masters in 1951, and Ph.D. in 1954; all from the University of Florida.

Pearson began his academic career as an Assistant Professor at the University of Tulsa in 1954. From 1960 to 1981, he was a zoology professor at Rutgers, also serving as Associate Provost from 1972 to 1977, and Executive Vice President from 1977 to 1981.

In 1981 Pearson was made the President of Miami University. He served as the head of this institution until 1992.

Pearson died on August 12, 2000, in Oxford, Ohio.

== Legacy ==
Pearson Hall on the Miami University campus is named in his honor.

== Personal life ==
He was married to Winfred Pearson. She died on August 27, 2021.

Preceded by Phillip R. Shriver	President of Miami University; 1981 – 1992	Succeeded by Paul G. Risser
