= James C. Garland =

American physicist

James C. Garland is a physicist, author and professor, and formerly the 20th president of Miami University in Oxford, Ohio.

Garland was educated at Princeton University (BA) and Cornell Univ. (PhD), in the field of condensed matter physics, and was an N.S.F Postdoctoral Fellow at the University of Cambridge. He has written more than 100 research papers, and is the author of Saving Alma Mater: A Rescue Plan for America's Public Universities, in which he advances changes in public university funding. He is now a Miami University president emeritus. Garland is a lifelong amateur radio operator, with the FCC call letters W8ZR (www.w8zr.net)

== Ohio State University ==
From 1970 to 1996 Garland taught at Ohio State University as a physics professor. He became Ohio State's graduate and research studies acting vice president, materials research laboratory director, department of physics chairperson, dean of the college of mathematical and physical sciences, and its dean of arts and sciences.

In 1991, Garland wrote a widely disseminated article on the art of presenting research at scientific conferences.

== Miami University, Oxford, OH ==
Garland became the President of Miami University in 1996. In 2002, his stated aim was to make Miami the "First in 2009", the university's bicentennial year. To achieve this status, he developed a strategy to raise intellectual quality and apply quantitative benchmarking and best practice, and led Miami in a significant capital improvement and construction program. Endowments doubled, and student applications increased by sixty percent.

He equalized in-state and out-of-state tuition fees and provided scholarships for Ohio students based on need. In 2004, Miami became the first Ohio public university to offer students domestic partner benefits, while Garland publicly criticized the Ohio Issue 1 amendment to the State Constitution that defined the status of non-marriage relationships.

In 1999, Garland recommended to the Miami's board of trustees that four men's sports should cease to be supported to fulfill the university's legal obligation under Title IX; due to financial constraint he thought it difficult to meet gender equity without such cuts. A court action in the United States Court of Appeals was brought against Miami University in 2002 by Miami's sports clubs, claiming the cuts constituted gender discrimination; the action failed.

Garland completed his tenure as Miami President in 2006.

== Saving Alma Mater ==
In 2009, Garland expounded his views on the state of higher education in public universities in his book Saving Alma Mater: A Rescue Plan for America's Public Universities. In an interview with Inside Higher Education in October 2009, where he presents public university education as vital but in need of change to survive successfully, he talks of four main areas of change that need to be addressed:

- He sees public universities becoming autonomous through deregulation, run by independent trustees who decide educational and financial policies.
- He argues that taxpayers' money should support less-well-off students through scholarships, not subsidize campuses; higher income students would pay more, lower income less. Best value schools would prosper and overall student numbers would rise. Research, low-enrollment, and vital programs would be protected.
- He sees university personnel cost as being the largest area of budget. Efficiency should be increased through voluntary financial incentives, and reducing committee sizes and numbers.
- He believes that candidate selection of senior administrators, presidents and chancellors by search committees and vested interests is inefficient and ineffective, and should operate more like private-sector universities. He also argues that state governors who typically appoint trustees should be educated about how to select qualified and effective candidates.

Garland's views were acknowledged in The New York Times. He spoke on topics raised in Saving Alma Mater at the University of Cincinnati, the University of Illinois, the University of Colorado, Wisconsin, and other venues. He spoke to the Pittsburgh Tribune-Review about financial concerns at Penn State University, He told of his criticism of what he saw as the mismanagement of campuses to The Washington Post, and in 2005, before the book was published, he expressed some of the same ideas to the same newspaper.

== Bibliography ==
- Saving Alma Mater: A Rescue Plan for America's Public Universities. The University of Chicago Press, 2009, ISBN 978-0-226-28386-9.

| Preceded by Paul G. Risser | President of Miami University; 1996–2006 | Succeeded by David C. Hodge |
