= Conrad C. Lautenbacher =

US Navy Vice Admiral and government official (born 1942)

Conrad C. Lautenbacher Jr.
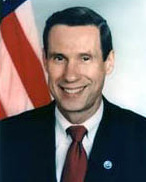

8th Under Secretary of Commerce for Oceans and Atmosphere 8th Administrator of the National Oceanic and Atmospheric Administration
- In office December 10, 2001 – October 31, 2008
- President: George W. Bush
- Preceded by: D. James Baker
- Succeeded by: Jane Lubchenco

Personal details
- Born: June 26, 1942 (age 84)
- Occupation: United States Navy Vice Admiral (retired), Under Secretary of Commerce for Oceans and Atmosphere (past)
- Scientific career
- Education: U.S. Naval Academy; Harvard University
- Fields: Applied mathematics
- Thesis: Gravity wave refraction by islands (1968)

Conrad Charles Lautenbacher Jr. (born June 26, 1942) is a retired United States Navy Vice Admiral, was the Under Secretary for Oceans and Atmosphere within the United States Department of Commerce and the eighth administrator of the National Oceanic and Atmospheric Administration. He was appointed to the position on December 19, 2001 and resigned effective October 31, 2008 in anticipation of a new White House administration. He was born in Philadelphia.

== Education and career ==
Before joining the Department of Commerce, Lautenbacher formed his own management consultant business, and worked principally for Technology, Strategies & Alliances Inc. He was also president and CEO of the Consortium for Oceanographic Research and Education, which is a non-profit organization with the goal of increasing basic knowledge and public support across the spectrum of ocean sciences. He possesses a Master of Science degree and a Ph.D. in applied mathematics from Harvard University.

He graduated from the U.S. Naval Academy in 1964 and is a retired U.S. Navy Vice Admiral with 40 years of service. His Navy experience includes tours as Commanding Officer of the USS Hewitt (DD-966), Commander of Naval Station Norfolk; and Commander of Cruiser-Destroyer Group Five. He had additional duties as Commander of U.S. Naval Forces Central Command at Riyadh during Operations Desert Shield and Desert Storm.

During his final tour of duty, he served as Deputy Chief of Naval Operations (Resources, Warfare Requirements and Assessments) in charge of Navy programs and budget. He had also served as Assistant for Strategy with the Chief of Naval Operations Executive Panel, and as Program Planning Branch Head in the Navy Program Planning Directorate.

== Under Secretary of Commerce for Oceans and Atmosphere ==
=== Administration ===
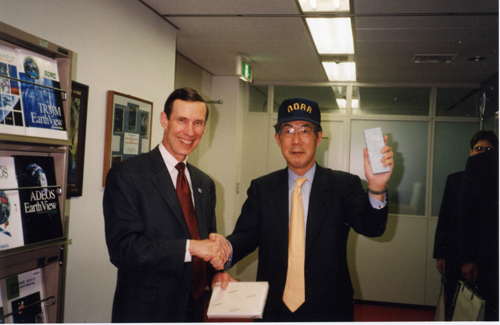
with Shūichirō Yamanouchi, President of the National Space Development Agency of Japan (2002)

After an investigation into Bill Proenza's management of the National Hurricane Center, Lautenbacher removed him as director on July 9, 2007. In September 2007, he was returned to his old job at the southern region of the National Weather Service. Proenza had drawn criticism from colleagues for calling the eight-year-old QuickSCAT system outdated. After the unauthorized killing of a gray whale by members of the Makah Indian tribe in September 2007, Lautenbacher met with tribal leaders to discuss the issue. He collaborated with other federal agencies on a new program to track volcanic ash and report the risks to the aviation community.

During Lautenbacher's tenure, the Open Rivers Initiative was started to provide funding and technical expertise for the community-driven removal of obsolete small dam and river barriers. According to the NOAA, over 3,500 large dams in the U.S. were considered unsafe in 2007. On the subject of the Bush administration's plan to expand the tsunami warning and detection system, Lautenbacher has said that the need for more buoys is critical, because their sensors measure passing tsunamis, whereas tide gauges measure changing water levels close to the coast.

Lautenbacher has rejected scientific claims that climate change is the greatest challenge facing humankind this century. In a November 2002 interview for the Australian television show Lateline, he said that evidence gathered so far fails to convince the US that extreme weather being felt around the globe is a direct result of climate change. In December 2004, he called the decline in health among coral reefs a global issue, essential to life on Earth.

=== Meetings and summits ===
Lautenbacher spearheaded the first Earth Observation Summit, which hosted ministerial-level representation from several dozen of the world's nations in July 2003. Through subsequent international summits and working groups, he worked to encourage world scientific and policy leaders to work toward a common goal of building a sustained Global Earth Observation System of Systems that would collect and disseminate data, information, and models to stakeholders and decision makers for the benefit of individual nations and the world community. The effort culminated in an agreement for a 10-year implementation plan for GEOSS reached by the 55 member countries of the Group on Earth Observations at the Third Observation Summit held in Brussels in February 2005.

He also has headed numerous delegations at international governmental summits and conferences around the world. This includes the U.S. delegation to the first and second Asia-Pacific Economic Cooperation Ocean Ministerial Meetings in Korea in 2002 and Indonesia in 2005, and the annual meetings of the World Meteorological Organization, Intergovernmental Oceanographic Commission, and the United Nations Framework Convention on Climate Change. He also led the Commerce delegation to the 2002 World Summit on Sustainable Development in South Africa.

Government offices
| Preceded by D. James Baker | 8th Administrator of the National Oceanic and Atmospheric Administration; 2001 – 2008 | Succeeded by Jane Lubchenco |
