= Robert W. MacVicar =

American chemist and academic administrator

Robert MacVicar
- Born: Robert William MacVicar; September 28, 1918; Princeton, Minnesota, U.S.
- Died: December 26, 1998 (aged 80); Portland, Oregon, U.S.

Academic background
- Education: University of Wyoming (BS); Oklahoma State University–Stillwater (MS); University of Wisconsin–Madison (PhD)
- Thesis: The Effect of Adrenaline Injections on the Chloride and Phosphorus Distribution of the Blood

Academic work
- Discipline: Chemistry; Biochemistry
- Institutions: Southern Illinois University; Oregon State University; College of Ganado

11th President of Oregon State University
- In office 1970–1984
- Preceded by: Roy Alton Young (acting)
- Succeeded by: John V. Byrne

Robert William MacVicar (1918–1998) was an American chemist and academic administrator who served as the chancellor of Southern Illinois University, and the 11th president of Oregon State University from 1970 and 1984.

== Early life and education ==
Robert W. MacVicar was born in Princeton, Minnesota, on September 28, 1918. MacVicar studied chemistry at the University of Wyoming, earning a Bachelor of Science degree in 1939. Upon graduation, MacVicar was awarded a Rhodes scholarship, but it proved impossible for him to attend due to the outbreak of World War II.

MacVicar enrolled and Oklahoma State University–Stillwater, where he continued his chemistry studies. MacVicar earned a Master of Science in 1940, authoring a thesis entitled "The Effect of Adrenaline Injections on the Chloride and Phosphorus Distribution of the Blood".

MacVicar spent the duration of the war as an officer in the United States Army. He left military service as a colonel in the United States Army Air Corps.

Following the conclusion of the war, MacVicar moved to Madison, Wisconsin, to attend the University of Wisconsin–Madison, from which he obtained a PhD in biochemistry in 1946. MacVicar's dissertation was entitled "The Boron Metabolism of Plants" and included material which he had been able to publish in the American Potato Journal and Botanical Gazette.

== Career ==
After earning his doctorate, MacVicar returned to Stillwater to take a position as an assistant professor of agricultural chemistry research and chemistry, later gaining promotion to a full professorship. He remained at Oklahoma State until 1964.

Concurrently with his professorship at Oklahoma State, MacVicar became involved in school administration, taking on the role of dean of the graduate school in 1953. He continued to serve in that capacity until his departure from Stillwater in 1964. From 1957 he also served as vice president for academic affairs.

In 1968, MacVicar was named chancellor of Southern Illinois University, located in the town of Carbondale in the state's downstate coal mining country. MacVicar remained there until 1970, when he came west to Corvallis, Oregon, to assume a post as the 15th president of Oregon State University.

MacVicar remained as head of Oregon State until his retirement in 1984, during which time the campus was expanded with the addition of 23 new buildings. Under MacVicar's watch the total number of faculty at OSU expanded from 1,766 to 2,247, while the school's budget tripled.

After his retirement, he was named professor emeritus of chemistry and president emeritus, special assistant to the chancellor. He also served as acting president of the College of Ganado, a small college in Arizona, for seven months in 1985.

MacVicar published over 135 papers, reports and articles.

== Death ==
MacVicar died on December 26, 1998, in Portland, Oregon, at the age of 80. His papers are archived in the Oregon State University library.

== Works ==
- Feeding Trials with Mineral and Protein Supplements for Two-and Three-Year-Old Steers Wintering on Dry Grass. With Oscar Burr Ross and D.F. Stephens. Stillwater, OK: Oklahoma Agricultural Experiment Station, 1950.
- Science is Everybody's Business. Oklahoma City, OK: United Founders Life Insurance Co., n.d. [1960].
- Vitamin A Studies with Beef Cattle: A Summary of Experimental Studies Conducted at Oklahoma State University, 1946–1959. With L.S. Pope and Frank H. Baker. Stillwater, OK: Oklahoma Agricultural Experiment Station, 1961.

Academic offices
Preceded by James Herbert Jensen	President of Oregon State University; 1970–1984	Succeeded by John V. Byrne
