= John V. Byrne =

American marine geologist and academic (1928–2024)

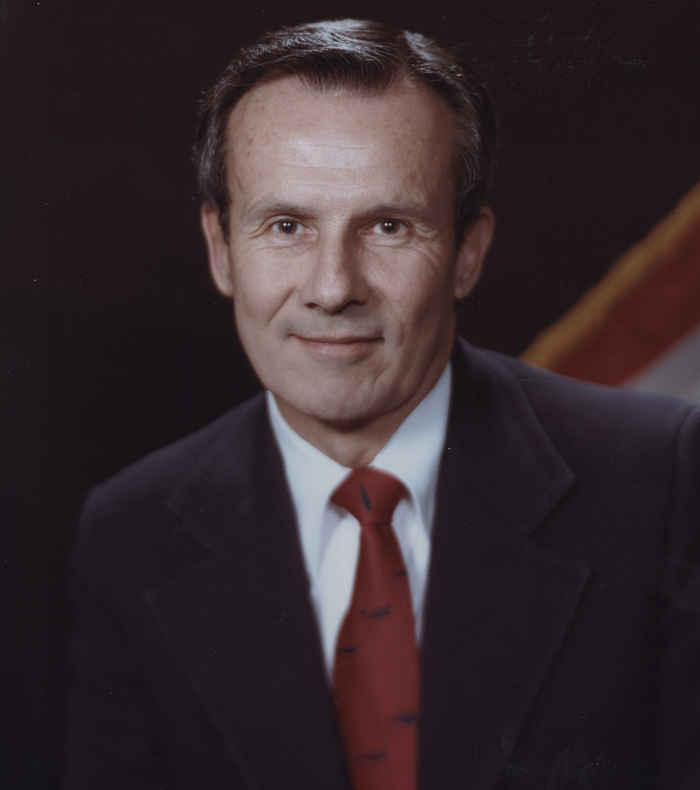
- Byrne, c. 1980s

12th President of Oregon State University
- In office November 15, 1984 – December 31, 1995
- Preceded by: Robert W. MacVicar
- Succeeded by: Paul G. Risser

3rd Under Secretary of Commerce for Oceans and Atmosphere 3rd Administrator of the National Oceanic and Atmospheric Administration
- In office 1981–1984
- President: Ronald Reagan
- Preceded by: Richard A. Frank
- Succeeded by: Anthony J. Calio

Personal details
- Born: May 9, 1928 Hempstead, New York, U.S.
- Died: January 11, 2024 (aged 95) Corvallis, Oregon, U.S.
- Party: Republican
- Education: Hamilton College (BS); Columbia University (MS); University of Southern California (PhD)
- Profession: Educator, marine geologist

John Vincent Byrne (May 9, 1928 – January 11, 2024) was an American marine geologist and academic. He served as the 3rd administrator of the National Oceanic and Atmospheric Administration from 1981 to 1984, and as the 12th president of Oregon State University from 1984 to 1995.

== Early life and education ==
Born in Hempstead, New York, Byrne attended Hamilton College, where he earned a Bachelor of Science in marine geology in 1951. He later earned a Master of Science degree in geology from Columbia University in 1953 and a Ph.D. in marine geology from the University of Southern California in 1957.

== Career ==
Byrne came to Oregon State University in 1960 and served until 1981, during which time he served as the school's first dean of oceanography, vice president for research and graduate studies and dean of research. Between 1972 and 1977, he was the director of the Hatfield Marine Science Center.

In 1981, Byrne was nominated by president Ronald Reagan to serve as the third administrator of the National Oceanic and Atmospheric Administration. He held the position until 1984, when he returned to Oregon State and was appointed president, succeeding Robert W. MacVicar. Byrne served until his retirement in 1995, when he was succeeded by Paul G. Risser.

== Personal life and death ==
Byrne resided in Corvallis, Oregon, following his retirement. He died at his home in Corvallis on January 11, 2024, at the age of 95.

Government offices
Preceded by Richard A. Frank	3rd Administrator of the National Oceanic and Atmospheric Administration; 1981 – 1984	Succeeded by Anthony J. Calio
Academic offices
Preceded by Robert W. MacVicar	12th President of Oregon State University; 1984–1995	Succeeded by Paul G. Risser
