= David C. Hodge =

21st president of Miami University

David Charles Hodge (born September 27, 1948, in Stewartville, Minnesota) was the 21st president of Miami University in Oxford, Ohio. He began his tenure on July 1, 2006. Previously he was the Dean of the College of Arts and Sciences at the University of Washington, where he was also chair of the Department of Geography. Hodge was born and raised in Minnesota and earned a bachelor's degree in 1970 from Macalester College and earned a doctorate in 1975 from Pennsylvania State University; both were in geography. On May 1, 2015, Hodge announced his intention to retire from the Miami presidency on June 30, 2016.

Preceded by James C. Garland	President of Miami University; 2006 – 2016	Succeeded by Greg Crawford
