= AccuWeather =

American weather forecast service corporation

AccuWeather, Inc.

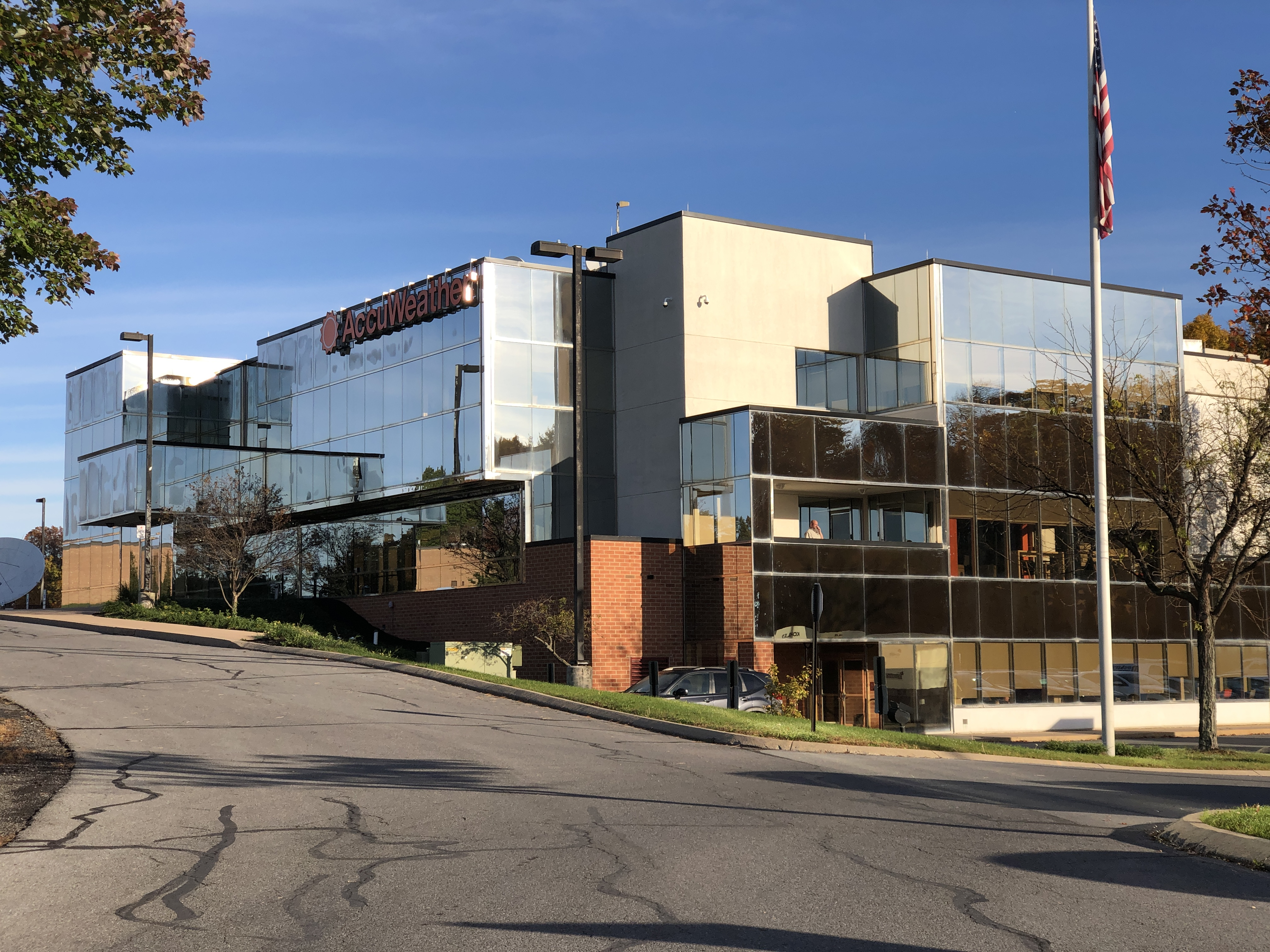
- AccuWeather headquarters in Ferguson Township, Pennsylvania
- Type: Private
- Industry: Meteorology
- Genre: Weather forecasting
- Founded: 1962; 64 years ago
- Founder: Joel Myers
- Headquarters: Ferguson Township, near State College, Pennsylvania, United States
- Key people: Joel Myers (founder and executive chair); Steven Smith (CEO)
- Services: Smartphone weather applications; Online forecasts and videos
- Number of employees: 500+
- Website: accuweather.com

AccuWeather, Inc. is a private-sector American media company that provides commercial weather forecasting services. AccuWeather was founded in 1962 by Joel N. Myers, initially focused on providing winter weather forecasts, and its customers were highway departments, utility companies, construction companies, and ski resorts. In 1971, the company expanded to year-round forecasting, and introduced the industry's first 7-day local forecast for television in 1975.

AccuWeather is headquartered in Ferguson Township, near State College, Pennsylvania, with offices in New York City and Wichita, Kansas. Internationally, AccuWeather has offices in Tokyo, Beijing, Seoul, and Mumbai.

== Company overview ==
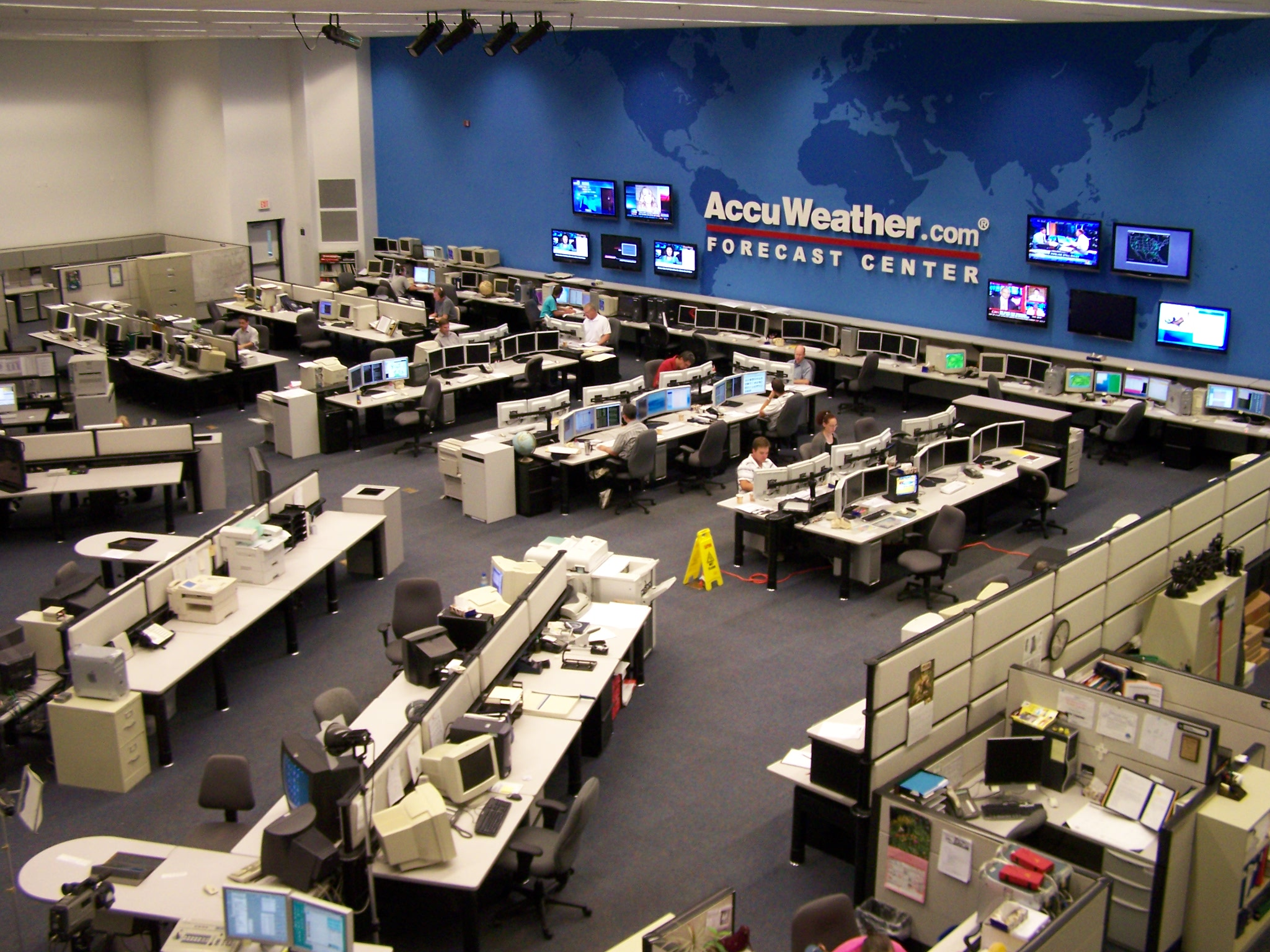
AccuWeather Forecast Center, 2026

AccuWeather provides weather forecasts, warnings, data and other weather-related services through its website, app, and TV channel. The company also provides commercial weather services to businesses and government agencies, including severe weather warnings, forecasts, alerts, and more. According to AccuWeather, more than half of Fortune 500 companies and thousands of other organizations use these services. AccuWeather provides some free services funded by advertising, and generates revenue through a tiered subscription model that provides access to additional features like access to longer-range forecasts and exclusive AccuWeather Severe Weather Alerts. It operates a 24/7 weather channel, The AccuWeather Network. Their headquarters are in State College, Pennsylvania, where the network's studio and master control facilities are based.

AccuWeather employs around 400 people, more than 100 of whom are meteorologists.

=== Leadership ===
As of June 2023, Steven R. Smith is the CEO, having succeeded company founder Dr. Joel N. Myers, who became executive chair. Joel Myers' brother Evan Myers was the chief operating officer until 2020 and Senior Vice President. His younger brother, Barry Lee Myers, was the chief executive officer from 2007 to January 1, 2019.

== Products and services ==
The AccuWeather app on Android

AccuWeather provides forecasting services to individual consumers, and performs weather-related predictive analytical services for businesses, including United Stations Radio Networks (previously through Westwood One until 2009). It produces local weather videos each day for use on its own website, on the Local AccuWeather Network, on wired Internet, and on its mobile application and websites. The mobile application has minute-by-minute forecasts. The company is also active in the areas of convergence and digital signage.

In 2015, AccuWeather entered into a joint venture with the Chinese company Huafeng Media Group, receiving the sole rights to deliver forecasts made by the China Meteorological Administration, a government agency that controls Huafeng.

In 2025, AccuWeather signed a partnership with Perplexity to integrate its weather forecasts and data into Perplexity's AI-powered search platform.

AccuWeather publishes estimates of the total damage and economic loss caused by major weather events worldwide. These estimates cover insured and uninsured losses, including direct damage to property and infrastructure, as well as indirect costs such as lost wages and supply-chain disruptions. AccuWeather has issued such estimates for the 2025 California wildfires, an unnamed East Coast storm in October 2025, and the September 2026 nor’easter, for which it gave a preliminary figure of $10–13 billion.

In 2026, AccuWeather integrated with ChatGPT as part of OpenAI's third-party app ecosystem, allowing access to weather information within the chat interface. The integration enabled the retrieval of real-time weather data, including precipitation estimates, air quality information, and weather alerts for specified locations.

AccuWeather provides localized hourly and daily UV Index forecasts. AccuWeather Chief Meteorologist Jonathan Porter said that the UV Index is intended as a public health tool rather than a guide for tanning. In 2026, The Skin Cancer Foundation incorporated AccuWeather's UV Index into its public education initiatives on sun protection. AccuWeather also provides UV index readings to the nearest tenth.

=== Personalities ===
AccuWeather's broadcast meteorologist Jim Kosek attracted attention in 2010 due to what the company described as his "all-out, manic style" announcements, including a blizzard forecast that became known as "snowmaggedon". Elliot Abrams retired from AccuWeather in 2019 after more than 50 years with the company.

AccuWeather's Chief Meteorologist is Jonathan Porter.

=== The Local AccuWeather Channel ===
On-air with a behind-the-scenes view of the production.

Starting in 2005, AccuWeather offered The Local AccuWeather Channel as a digital subchannel to television stations. In 2021, AccuWeather launched its video streaming service AccuWeatherNOW, which provides 24-hour weather programming. AccuWeather continues to provide local weather content to noncommercial Milwaukee PBS station WMVT-DT3 under a separate agreement.

=== MinuteCast ===
In January 2015, AccuWeather introduced MinuteCast, a hyperlocal Minute-by-Minute forecast of precipitation type/intensity, and start/end times, pinpointed to a street address or GPS location. It is available in most major countries.

=== AccuWeather for Business ===
AccuWeather for Business provides weather forecasting, severe weather warnings, weather data, and decision support services. According to AccuWeather, more than half of the Fortune 500 companies use its services.

=== AccuWeather Lightning Network ===
The AccuWeather Lightning Network provides real-time lightning alerts, detailed risk analysis, and safety recommendations based on specific locations.

=== MS NOW, CNBC broadcast ===
In 2025, AccuWeather entered a distribution agreement with Versant Media to make AccuWeather forecasts available on CNBC and MS NOW.

=== National weather channel ===
In 2015, Verizon FiOS replaced The Weather Channel with a new 24/7 all-weather television network called "The AccuWeather Channel". This followed earlier negotiations among AccuWeather, The Weather Channel, and DirecTV. The AccuWeather Network is a separate operation from "The Local AccuWeather Channel", which continues to run in selected markets across the country. It became the third 24/7 weather network to launch on American television, after The Weather Channel in 1982 and WeatherNation TV in 2011. The AccuWeather Network is also carried on streaming services, including Spectrum TV, DIRECTV, Frontier, Philo, and FuboTV.

=== AccuWeather Now ===
In July 2021, AccuWeather announced a companion over-the-top channel, AccuWeather Now, that will focus mainly on viral videos and shared social media content.

- SamsungTV
- Amazon Freevee
- The Roku Channel
- EverPass
- Xumo
- LG Channels

=== RealFeel temperature ===
AccuWeather created a unified and proprietary apparent temperature system known as the exclusive "AccuWeather RealFeel Temperature" and has used it in its forecasts and observations. The formula for calculating this value incorporates the effects of more than a dozen parameters, including temperature, wind, humidity, sunshine intensity, and cloudiness. AccuWeather has been granted a United States patent on The RealFeel Temperature. In response to AccuWeather's "RealFeel", The Weather Channel introduced its "FeelsLike" temperature reading.

AccuWeather also provides RealFeel Shade on its digital platforms and mobile app. It is the apparent temperature in shaded conditions, intended to account for the reduction in perceived heat experienced outside direct sunlight.

=== Pollen Index ===
AccuWeather provides a Pollen Index and Allergy Outlook that shows localized forecasts for common airborne allergens, and also regional maps of expected allergy conditions.

AccuWeather also publishes seasonal allergy forecasts that project the timing, intensity, and geographic distribution of pollen seasons across the United States. These forecasts attribute changes in pollen seasons to weather patterns such as temperature, rainfall, wind, and late-season frosts, which influence the timing and intensity of pollen production. It includes impact levels of the five top allergens: tree pollen, grass pollen, ragweed pollen, mold, and dust and dander.

=== Plume Labs ===
AccuWeather acquired air pollution startup Plume Labs in 2022. Plume Labs started in 2014 as an air pollution visualization and forecasting service using data gathered through government-controlled stations and individual contributors. It later offered street-by-street AQI predictions. It also sold Flow, a pocket-sized device to measure AQI, though less accurately than government stations. A community of users was set up to build pollution maps; the large number of Flow devices sold generated more reports than the smaller number of government stations.

Sales of Flow devices were discontinued in the spring of 2023.

== Criticisms ==
=== Long-term forecasting practices ===
In April 2012, AccuWeather increased the range of their forecast to 90 days. AccuWeather's critics have questioned the practice of disseminating long-range forecasts, saying they are no better at predicting the weather than averaging historical conditions. The Washington Post has commissioned informal assessments into long-range forecasts by Jason Samenow and Jon Nese.

AccuWeather responded that it did not claim absolute precision in such extremely long forecasts, and advised users to use the forecast only to observe general trends in the forecast period.

=== National Weather Service ===
The National Weather Service provides publicly-funded information for use without charge by the public by placing it in the public domain. AccuWeather stated that "NOAA foundational weather data is one of 190 sources that AccuWeather uses as inputs into our proprietary and patented Forecast Engine (SWIFT), which also uses AI, 250 patents, the expertise of more than 100 meteorologists, and over 60 years of intellectual capital to generate our forecasts and warnings."

On April 14, 2005, U.S. Senator Rick Santorum (R-PA), who received campaign contributions from AccuWeather's president, Joel Myers, introduced the National Weather Service Duties Act of 2005 in the U.S. Senate. Critics argued that the legislation could benefit commercial weather companies by limiting the services provided directly by the NWS. AccuWeather said that it did not seek to restrict public access to weather information or advocate for the full commercialization of the NWS. The bill did not come up for a vote.

On October 12, 2017, President Donald Trump nominated AccuWeather CEO Barry Lee Myers, the younger brother of the company's founder, to head the National Weather Service's parent administration, the National Oceanic and Atmospheric Administration. Myers, who held degrees in business and law rather than an advanced scientific degree, stepped down as AccuWeather's CEO in January 2019 and divested his ownership in the company. He had run AccuWeather as a successful, profitable company for twelve years. After his nomination had remained pending for two years, Myers withdrew his consideration for nomination on November 12, 2019, due to ill health. That year, he also responded in The Washington Post to allegations of sexual harassment at AccuWeather, which the company denied.

=== iOS location privacy ===
In August 2017, security researcher Will Strafach intercepted traffic from the AccuWeather iPhone app to discover that it inadvertently sent location information to Reveal Mobile through a faulty SDK, even when customers have not given permission to share location information. ZDnet independently verified this information. AccuWeather stated that it did not know the app was tracking location information without users' consent and that it did not use the data in any way and released an update to the App Store which removed the Reveal Mobile SDK.

=== Lobbying ===
AccuWeather has lobbied the US government to stop providing services for free to the public and to privatize the National Weather Service, thus enabling AccuWeather to provide those services at a charge instead.
