= Ed Ray (academic) =

President of Oregon State University

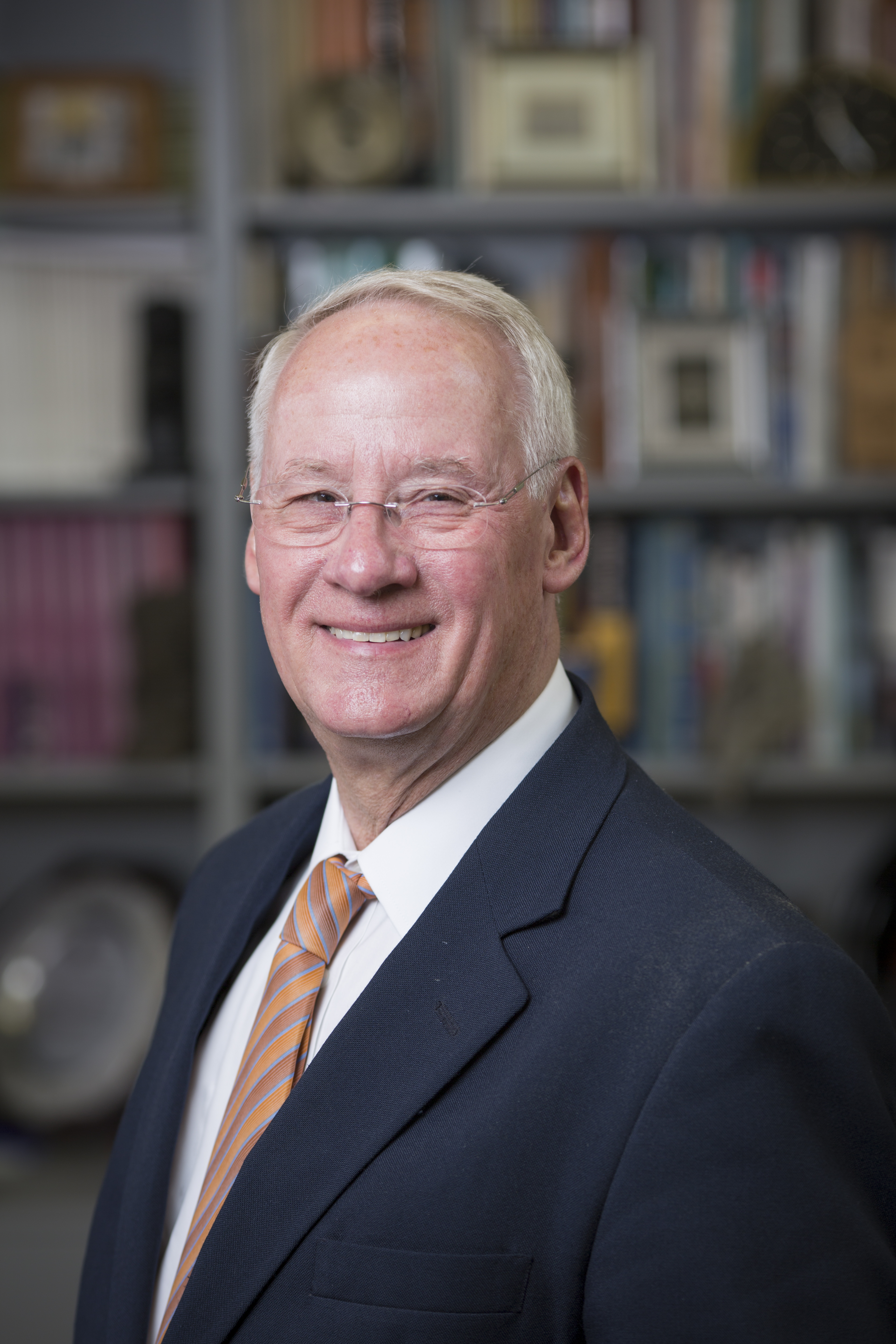
- Born: September 10, 1944 (age 82); Queens, New York, U.S.
- Board member of: Special Olympics Oregon (Chairman)
- Spouse: Virginia Beth Phelps (m. 1969; died 2014)
- Children: 3

Academic background
- Education: Queens College (BS); Stanford University (MA, PhD)
- Thesis: Finance in a Development Context: Lessons from West Germany (1971)
- Doctoral advisor: Ronald McKinnon

Academic work
- Discipline: Economics
- Sub-discipline: International trade
- Institutions: Ohio State University (1970–2003); Oregon State University (2003–present)

14th President of Oregon State University
- In office July 31, 2003 – June 30, 2020
- Preceded by: Paul G. Risser
- Succeeded by: F. King Alexander

Edward John Ray (born September 10, 1944) is an American economist who became the 14th president of Oregon State University on July 31, 2003. Prior to joining Oregon State, Ray was executive vice president and provost of Ohio State University for the previous six years. At OSU, Ray earned $648,648 for his position as president and $17,550 for his position as professor in the School of Public Policy, for a gross salary of $666,198. He also serves as chairman of the NCAA's Executive Committee.

== Early life and education ==
Ray was born in Jackson Heights, Queens. Ray received his undergraduate degree in mathematics from Queens College, City University of New York in June 1966, graduating cum laude and Phi Beta Kappa. He earned his master's degree in economics from Stanford University in 1969 and his doctorate in economics from Stanford in June 1971.

His work has been published in The American Economic Review, The Journal of Political Economy, The Quarterly Journal of Economics, The Review of Economic Studies and other leading journals. He has co-authored a principles text, and his book, "U.S. Protectionism and the World Debt Crisis" was published by Quorum Press in 1989.

His wife Beth (1946-2014) was a counselor and assistant dean in the College of Arts and Sciences at Ohio State University. They have three children and three grandchildren. On March 21, 2014, she died from lung cancer.

== Career ==
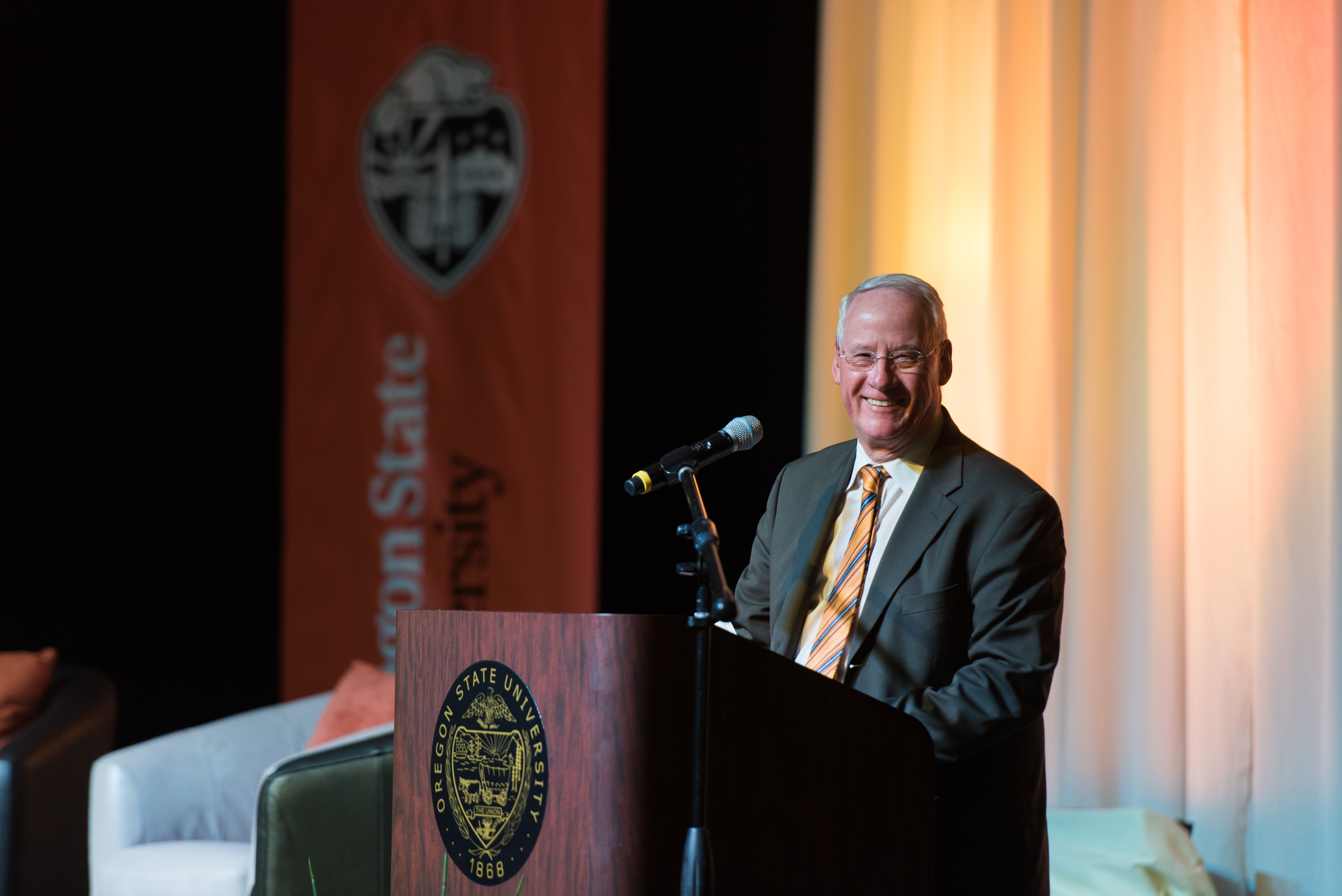
Ray as president of Oregon State University, 2017

=== Academic administration ===
Ray was a member of the economics faculty at Ohio State from 1970 to 2003. At the time of his appointment to lead the department in 1976, just six years into his tenure and only 31 years old, he was the youngest person ever to serve as department chair in the university's history. He remained in that capacity until May 1992 when he accepted the job as Associate Provost, one year later becoming Senior Vice Provost and Chief Information Officer, and eventually Executive Vice President and Provost from 1998 to 2003.

Among his notable accomplishments during that time are the growth of its enrollment from 19,000 to over 31,000 students, the completion of the first fundraising campaign to generate more than one billion dollars, the expansion of the Oregon State University Cascades Campus in Bend into a four-year degree granting institution, and the elevation of the forestry and oceanography programs to global rankings of second and third respectively, as measured by the Center for World University Rankings in 2017.

On March 22, 2019 Ray announced that he would be retiring at the end of his current five-year contract, effective on June 30, 2020, to be replaced by F. King Alexander.

=== NCAA Chairmanship ===
Ed Ray was one of the key architects, along with NCAA President Mark Emmert, of the unprecedented sanctions against the Penn State football program in the aftermath of the Jerry Sandusky scandal. On July 23, 2012, the NCAA issued penalties that included a 4-year bowl ban, severe scholarship reductions, the vacating of 112 wins from 1998-2011, and a $60 million fine against the school. The decision by the NCAA was extremely controversial, as the NCAA has never involved itself in a criminal matter and the NCAA had nothing in its bylaws that would justify this action. Many claimed that the decision was made to bolster the NCAA's public image, which had taken a hit in recent years due to weak punishments for infractions. In response to the sanctions, Pennsylvania state senator Jake Corman and the estate of former Penn State football coach, Joe Paterno, filed separate lawsuits against the NCAA.

During the discovery phase of Corman's lawsuit, it was revealed in internal emails that the NCAA worked closely with Louis Freeh in his investigation of the Sandusky scandal. In addition, emails revealed that many in the NCAA questioned whether they had the authority to sanction Penn State and that some officials wanted to "bluff" Penn State's leadership into accepting a severe punishment, because they believed that they did not have the authority to punish Penn State.

On January 15, 2015, Ray's deposition in the lawsuit was made public, in which he admitted under oath that he did not read the Freeh Report nor had he reviewed the consent decree drafted by the NCAA before he appeared in a press conference, along with Emmert, announcing the severe sanctions against the Penn State football program. The following day, the NCAA settled the Corman lawsuit by withdrawing all remaining sanctions against Penn State, including the vacating of the program's victories from 1998-2011, returning Joe Paterno to his status as the winningest coach in Division 1 football history.

Academic offices
Preceded by Paul G. Risser	President of Oregon State University; 2003–2020	Succeeded by F. King Alexander
