= Phillip Shriver =

American historian (1922–2011)

- Born: Phillip Raymond Shriver; August 16, 1922; Cleveland, Ohio, US
- Died: April 23, 2011 (aged 88); Oxford, Ohio, US
- Spouse: Martha Damaris Nye (m. 1944)
- Scientific career
- Fields: history administrator

Phillip Raymond Shriver (August 16, 1922 – April 23, 2011) was an American historian and college administrator who was president of Miami University in Oxford, Ohio, from 1965 to 1981.

== Biography ==
Phillip R. Shriver was born in Cleveland, Ohio. After graduation in 1940 from John Adams High School, where he was president and valedictorian of his class, he received a four-year Cleveland Alumni Scholarship to Yale University. At Yale, he was elected to Phi Beta Kappa, served as regimental commander of the Naval V-12 unit, and graduated in 1943 with honors in history. During World War II, he served as a lieutenant (j.g.) in the U.S. Navy aboard the Pacific Fleet destroyer USS Murray and participated in the Iwo Jima and Okinawa campaigns. After the war, he completed his master's degree in history at Harvard in 1946 and his doctorate in American history at Columbia University in 1954.

== Career ==
From 1947 to 1965, he was a member of the history faculty at Kent State University where he was initiated into Delta Upsilon fraternity as an advisor to the Kent State chapter. He wrote Years of Youth in 1960, a history of Kent State University. He also served as Kent State's Dean of the College of Arts and Sciences from 1963 to 1965.

He left Kent State in 1965 to become the 17th president of Miami University. For 16 years, he oversaw enormous growth at Miami and was tremendously popular with students, who nicknamed him "Uncle Phil." While he was president, Miami opened new campuses in Middletown, Ohio; Hamilton, Ohio; and Luxembourg; 10 doctoral programs were initiated on the Oxford campus; and 42 new buildings were constructed on the Miami campuses. During and after his presidency, he taught popular classes to standing room only crowds on the history of Miami University and the history of Ohio, using The Miami Years, a history book by longtime Miami English Professor Walter Havighurst as the text. His Miami history lectures became the basis of his 1998 book Miami University: A Personal History. Phil considered the 52 years he spent teaching in the classroom and the relationships he had with faculty, staff, and thousands of students to be his most important professional accomplishments and his greatest joy. He continued to captivate audiences with his guest lectures up until his final days.

Besides authoring or co-authoring seven books and more than 200 articles, he is also remembered for his service as Chairman of the Council of Presidents of the National Association of State Universities and Land Grant Colleges, Chairman of the Board of the Federal Reserve Bank of Cincinnati, President of the Ohio Historical Society and the Ohio Academy of History, a member of the Lakeside, Ohio Board of Directors, an active member of the Oxford Rotary Club and the Oxford Presbyterian Church, and his lifelong association with Delta Upsilon fraternity.

He received the 1991 Distinguished Service Award from the Ohio Academy of History, the Ohio Humanities Council's 2001 Bjornson Award for Distinguished Service in the Humanities, and the 2004 Cincinnati Society of Association Executives Statesman Award. In 2009 he was inducted into the Ohio Veterans Hall of Fame. He received honorary degrees from 10 universities as well as honors from the Grand Duchy of Luxembourg and the Federal University of Parana in Brazil.

Miami University's former student union, now a multi-use building, is named the Phillip R. Shriver Center in his honor.

== Family ==
On April 15, 1944, Phil married Martha Damaris Nye of Bellevue, Ohio, whom he had first met while she was a student at Wellesley College. They became the parents of five children: Carolyn (Bill) Shaul, Susan, Melinda (David) Williams, Darcy, and Raymond Scott II (Vicki); eight grandchildren (Trevor and Ryan Helwig, Lindsay and Andrew LaVine, Katherine and Ryan Williams, and Cameron and Kyle Shriver); and four great-grandchildren (Taylor, Avery, Marin, and Anna Helwig). He is the son of Raymond Scott Shriver and C. Ruth Smith Shriver. His older sister, Barbara Ruth Shriver Taylor, lives in Tampa, Florida.

Preceded by John D. Millett	President of Miami University; 1965–1981	Succeeded by Paul G. Pearson
