= Jane Harman =

American politician (born 1945)

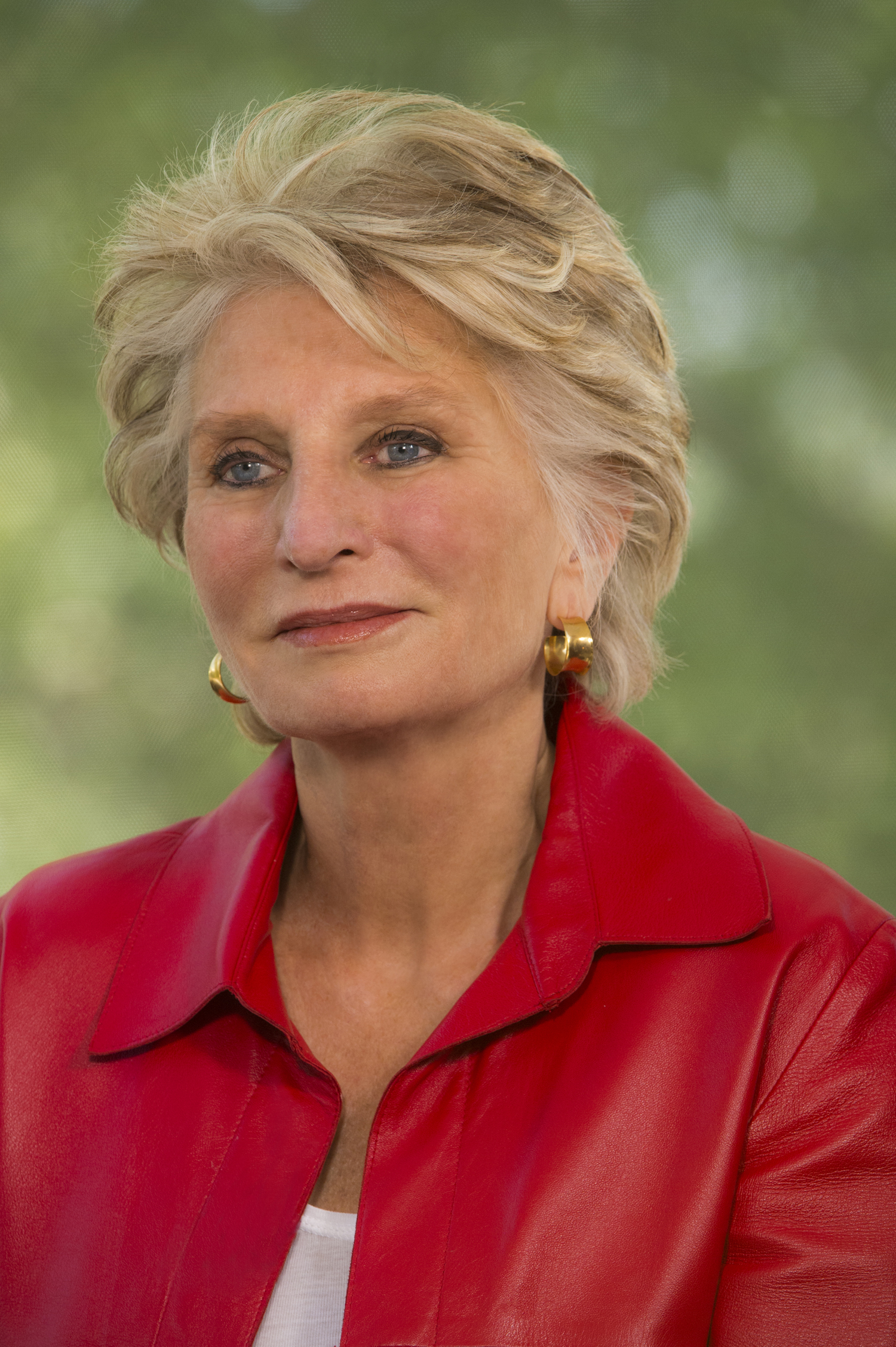
- Official portrait, 2011

President of the Woodrow Wilson International Center for Scholars
- In office February 28, 2011 – February 28, 2021
- President: Barack Obama; Donald Trump; Joe Biden
- Preceded by: Lee Hamilton
- Succeeded by: Mark Green

Member of the U.S. House of Representatives from California's 36th district
- In office January 3, 2001 – February 28, 2011
- Preceded by: Steven T. Kuykendall
- Succeeded by: Janice Hahn
- In office January 3, 1993 – January 3, 1999
- Preceded by: Mel Levine (redistricted)
- Succeeded by: Steven T. Kuykendall

Personal details
- Born: Jane Margaret Lakes New York City, New York, U.S.
- Party: Democratic
- Spouse(s): Richard A. Frank (m. 1969; div. 1978) Sidney Harman (m. 1980; died 2011)
- Children: 4
- Education: Smith College (BA); Harvard University (JD)
- Harman's voice Harman on restricting the use of jihadist terminology within the United States Intelligence Community; Recorded July 16, 2008

Jane Lakes Harman (born June 28, 1945) is an American former politician who served as the U.S. representative for California's 36th congressional district from 1993 to 1999 and again from 2001 to 2011. A member of the Democratic Party, she was the ranking member on the House Intelligence Committee (2002–2006), before she chaired the Homeland Security Committee's Intelligence Subcommittee (2007–2011). Harman was a conservative Blue Dog Democrat.

Resigning from Congress in February 2011, Harman became president and CEO of the Woodrow Wilson International Center for Scholars. She succeeded former U.S. representative Lee Hamilton and was the first ever woman to lead the organization. She stepped down in February 2021. She is also a distinguished scholar and president emerita.

== Early life and education ==
Harman was born Jane Margaret Lakes in New York City, the daughter of Lucille (née Geier) and Adolf N. Lakes. She is Jewish. Her father was born in Poland and escaped from Nazi Germany in 1935; he worked as a medical doctor. Her mother was born in the United States and was the first in her family to receive a college education. Her maternal grandparents immigrated from Russia. Harman's family moved to Los Angeles, California when she was 4 and there she attended Los Angeles public schools, graduating from University High School in 1962. She received a bachelor's degree in government, magna cum laude, from Smith College in 1966 and served as president of the Smith College Young Democrats. Harman continued her studies at Harvard Law School, where she earned her juris doctor degree in 1969.

== Career ==
=== Early career ===
After graduating from law school, Harman – then known as Jane Lakes – married future NOAA administrator Richard A. Frank in 1969, and they had two children. They spent a short time in Switzerland, and then she worked for two years as an associate with the law firm Surrey, Karasik and Morse in Washington, D.C. She began her political career by serving on the staff of Senator John V. Tunney, as his legislative assistant from 1972 to 1973. In 1973, Tunney named her his senior counsel and staff director for the Senate Judiciary Subcommittee on Constitutional Rights in 1975. During this time she also taught at Georgetown. When Tunney lost re-election in 1976, Harman – then known as Jane Lakes Frank – joined the Carter White House where she served as Deputy Secretary of the Cabinet. She became a special counsel to the Department of Defense from 1979 to 1980.

=== U.S. House, 1993 to 1999 ===
Harman was first elected to Congress in 1992 and became the first Smith College graduate to be elected to Congress. From 1993 to 1999, Harman represented California's 36th district, serving in the 103rd, 104th, and 105th Congresses. In 1994, she barely survived reelection in a heavily Republican year, winning by 812 votes over Rancho Palos Verdes Mayor Susan Brooks.

=== 1998 California gubernatorial campaign ===
Harman did not run for the 106th United States Congress in 1998, instead entering the 1998 California gubernatorial race.

After losing the Democratic nomination to Lieutenant Governor Gray Davis, she briefly taught public policy and international relations at UCLA as a Regents' Professor before running for and winning her old congressional seat in the 2000 election.

=== U.S. House, 2001 to 2011 ===
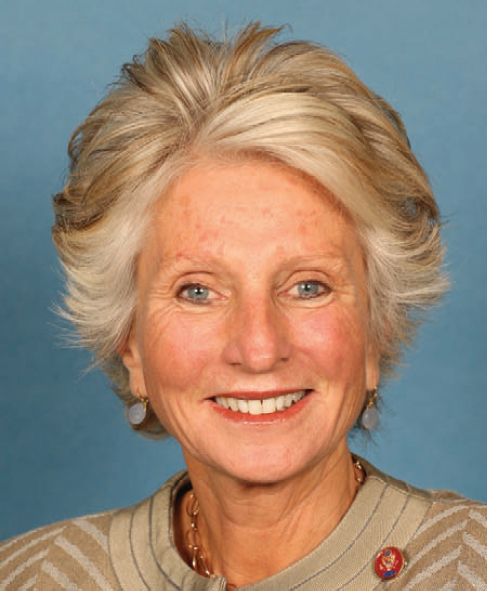
Harman's portrait during her second term as a U.S. representative (c. 2008)

Harman narrowly won her old seat in 2000, defeating Republican incumbent Steven T. Kuykendall, and was re-elected again in 2002, 2004, 2006, 2008, and 2010.

Representing the aerospace center of California during her nine terms in Congress, she served on all the major security committees: six years on Armed Services, eight years on Intelligence, and eight on Homeland Security. She made numerous congressional fact-finding missions to hotspots around the world, including North Korea, Syria, Libya, Afghanistan, Pakistan, Yemen, and Guantanamo Bay. During her long public career, Harman has been recognized as a national expert at the nexus of security and public policy issues. She received the Defense Distinguished Service Medal in 1998, the CIA Agency Seal Medal in 2007, and the CIA Director's Award, and the Director of National Intelligence Distinguished Public Service Medal in 2011.

Harman is a tenacious pro-Israeli, who used to have close ties to the U.S. intelligence community. She resigned in February 2011, to head the Washington-based Woodrow Wilson Center, a foreign policy think tank.

=== 2009 wiretap/AIPAC allegations ===
In 2009, it was revealed NSA wiretaps reportedly intercepted a 2005 phone call between Harman and an agent of the Israeli government, in which Harman allegedly agreed to lobby the Justice Department to reduce or drop criminal charges against two employees of AIPAC in exchange for increased support for Harman's campaign to chair the House Intelligence Committee. Harman denied the allegations, and called for the government to release the full transcript of the wire-tapped conversation, something they never did. In June 2009, Harman received a letter from the Justice Department and House Ethics Committee declaring her "neither a subject nor a target of an ongoing investigation by the Criminal Division." The espionage charges were later dropped on the two employees from AIPAC.

=== Political positions ===
Harman is on most issues a liberal, earning a 95% rating from the liberal group Americans for Democratic Action. On intelligence and defense issues, Ben Pershing described her as a centrist. For example, she was one of many Democrats who supported the Iraq War. Harman has combined a moderate stance on economic, trade, and foreign policy issues with liberal stances on social issues.

==== Armenian genocide ====
Harman was a co-sponsor of the Armenian genocide recognition resolution bill in 2007. However, while still cosponsoring the bill, she wrote a letter to House Foreign Affairs Committee Chair Tom Lantos urging him to delay a floor vote on the legislation. Her argument was that while the genocide deserved recognition, it was not a good time to embarrass Turkey, given that country's role in moderating extremism in the Middle East.

=== Other activities ===
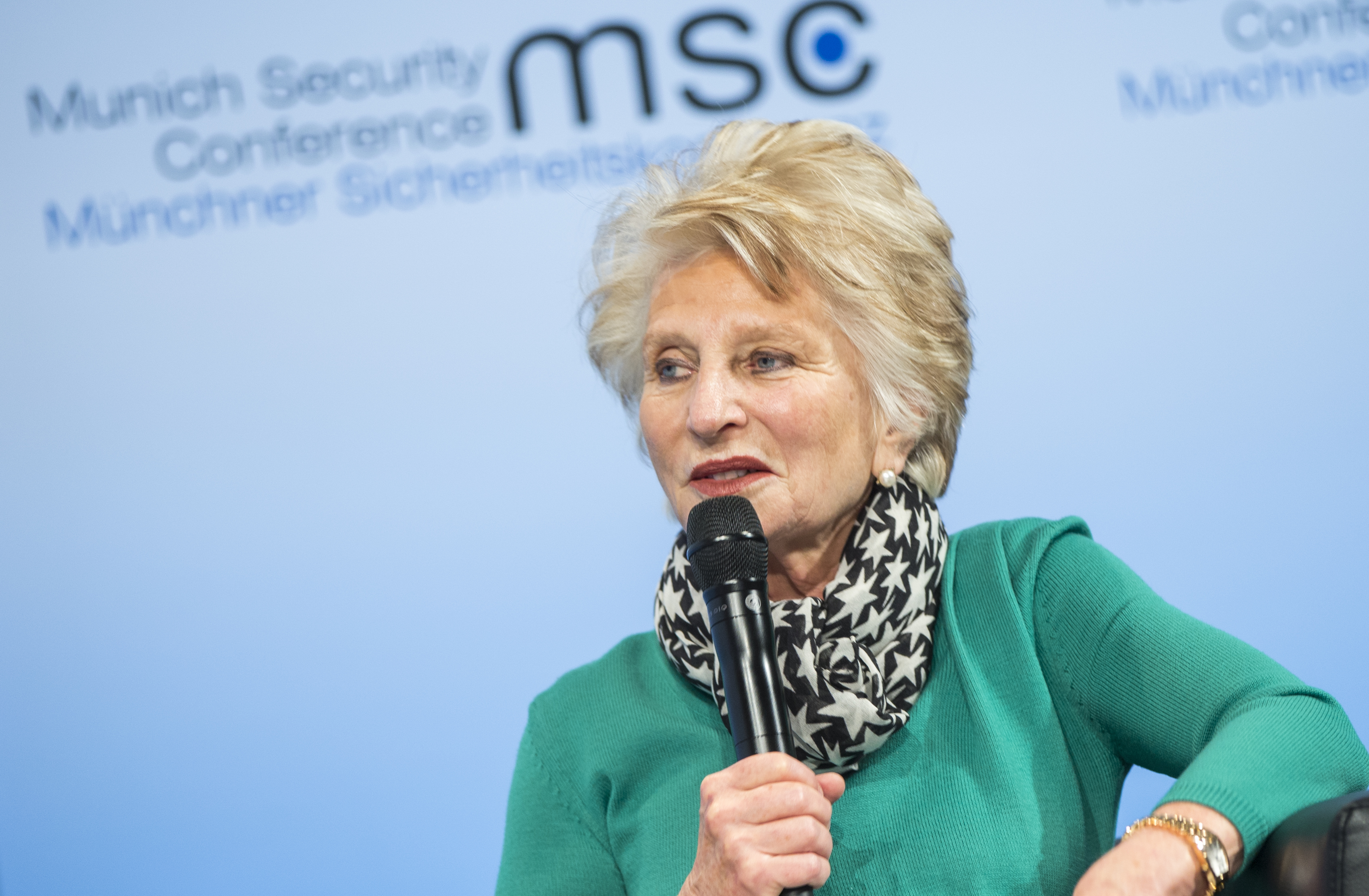
Harman during the MSC 2017

Harman served as a member of the Defense Policy Board, the State Department Foreign Affairs Policy Board, the Director of National Intelligence’s Senior Advisory Group, and the Homeland Security Advisory Council. She was a member of the CIA External Advisory Board from 2011 to 2013. Harman is a Trustee of the Aspen Institute and an Honorary Trustee of the University of Southern California. She also serves on the Presidential Debates Commission and the Committee for a Responsible Federal Budget and is a member of the ReFormers Caucus of Issue One.

She is a member of the Aspen Strategy Group, and serves on the Executive Committees of the Trilateral Commission and the Munich Security Conference.

== Personal life ==
Harman's first marriage was to Richard Frank, in 1969, with whom she had two children. Her second marriage was to audio pioneer and multi-millionaire Sidney Harman, who served from 1977 to 1979 as the Undersecretary of the Department of Commerce in the Carter administration before repurchasing the company he founded, Harman International Industries, and later taking it public. She also had two children with him. She has eight grandchildren.

Sidney Harman retired in 2008 from Harman Industries, purchased Newsweek magazine in 2010, and founded the Academy for Polymathic Study at USC before he died in April 2011. Harman maintains her residence in Venice Beach, California, and has homes in Washington, D.C., and Aspen, Colorado.

Harman was a good friend of Senator Dianne Feinstein, and was among the last people to visit Feinstein prior to her death in 2023.

== Works ==
- Harman, Jane (2021). Insanity Defense: Why Our Failure to Confront Hard National Security Problems Makes Us Less Safe (First ed.). New York: St. Martin's Press. ISBN 9781250758774. OCLC 1236897967.

== See also ==
- List of Jewish members of the United States Congress
- Women in the United States House of Representatives

U.S. House of Representatives
Preceded by George Brown	Member of the U.S. House of Representatives from California's 36th congressional district 1993–1999	Succeeded by Steven Kuykendall
Preceded by Steven Kuykendall	Member of the U.S. House of Representatives from California's 36th congressional district 2001–2011	Succeeded by Janice Hahn
Preceded by Nancy Pelosi	Ranking Member of the House Intelligence Committee; 2003–2007	Succeeded by Pete Hoekstra
Non-profit organization positions
Preceded by Lee Hamilton	President of the Woodrow Wilson International Center for Scholars; 2011–2021	Succeeded by Mark Green
U.S. order of precedence (ceremonial)
Preceded by Christopher Cox as Former U.S. representative	Order of precedence of the United States as Former U.S. representative	Succeeded by George Radanovich as Former U.S. representative
