= Richard A. Frank =

American lawyer and administrator (1936–2014)

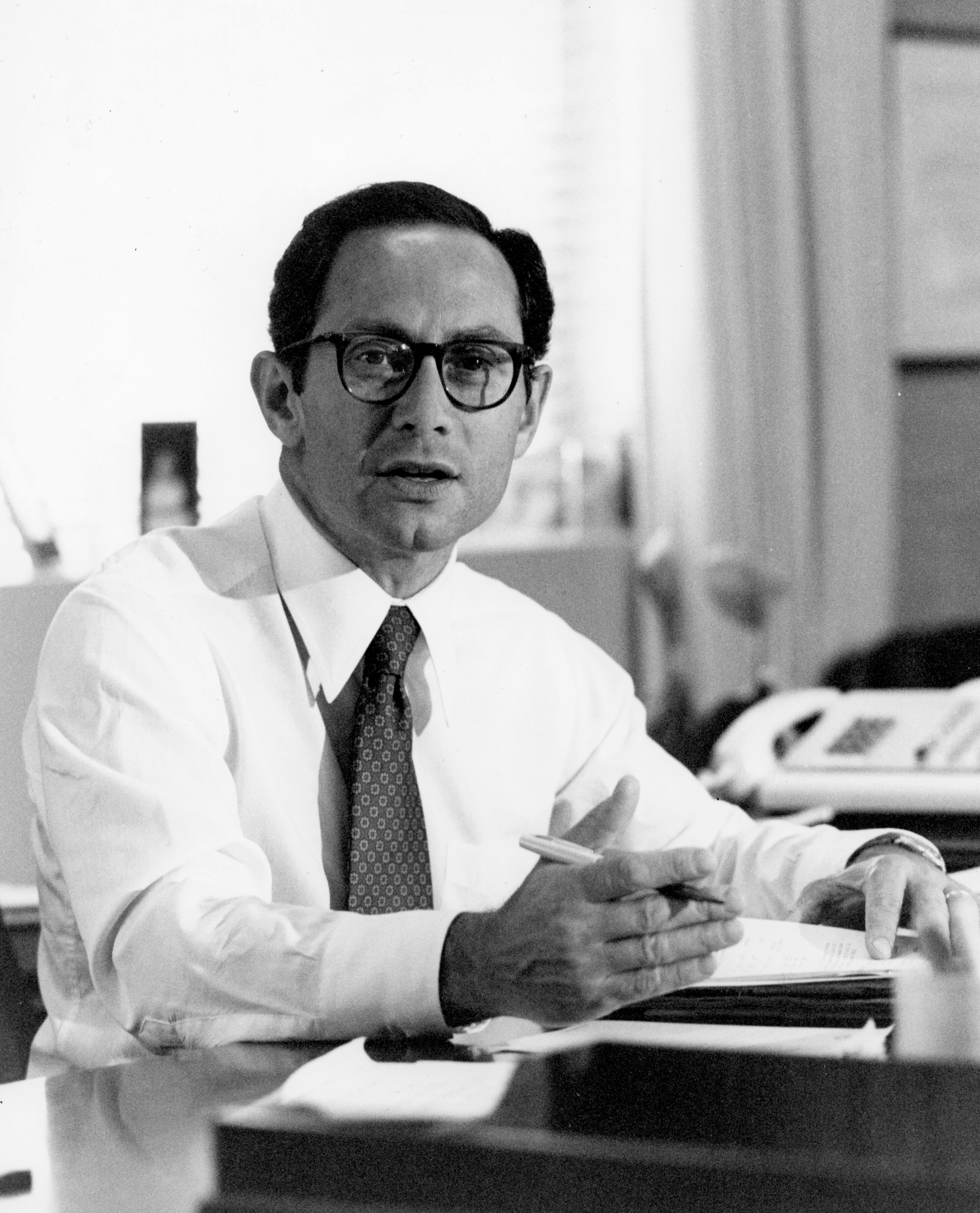

2nd Under Secretary of Commerce for Oceans and Atmosphere 2nd Administrator of the National Oceanic and Atmospheric Administration
- In office July 13, 1977 – January 20, 1981
- President: Jimmy Carter
- Preceded by: Robert M. White
- Succeeded by: John V. Byrne

Personal details
- Born: November 4, 1936 Omaha, Nebraska
- Died: April 20, 2014 (aged 77) Washington, DC
- Education: Harvard University; Harvard Law School
- Occupation: Lawyer

Richard Asher Frank (November 11, 1936 – April 20, 2014) was an American lawyer, the 2nd Administrator of the National Oceanic and Atmospheric Administration (NOAA) and the president of Population Services International (PSI).

== Early life ==
Richard Frank was born on November 4, 1936, in Omaha, Nebraska. He graduated from Harvard College in 1958 and from Harvard Law School in 1962.

== Career ==
After graduating from law school, he moved to Washington and worked in the State Department's Office of the Legal Advisor. He was promoted to legal advisor for Economic Affairs where he supervised matters relating to trade, participating in the drafting and negotiation of the Panama Canal Treaties and acting as the spokesman for the U.S. during the Intelsat conference. He was the State Department counsel to the Warren Commission's inquiry into the assassination of John F. Kennedy. He left the State Department in 1969. He was also a lecturer at George Washington University in 1967 on public international law and organizations and an adjunct professor at George Washington Law School in 1968-69, teaching "Negotiations-Concept and Technique." He met his first wife, Jane Lakes in 1969, during a job interview at Harvard.

In 1970, Frank joined the Center for Law and Social Policy and became its director in 1976.

In 1977, Jimmy Carter appointed him to be the 2nd Administrator of NOAA, and the youngest ever. He served until the end of the Carter administration in 1981. Frank was the first NOAA administrator without a science degree.

Frank then went into private practice with the law firm of Wald, Harkrader & Ross where he represented, among others, the organization PSI.

In 1987, he was hired to be the chief executive of PSI, a job he held until 2008.

Frank was married twice. His first marriage to Jane Lakes in 1969 ended in divorce in 1978, following which Lake married Frank's old boss Deputy Secretary of Commerce Sidney Harman and then went on to serve for years in Congress. Frank's second marriage to Susan Coulson, ended with his death at which time the two were separated. He had two children with each of his wives. He died in 2014 from progressive supranuclear palsy in an assisted living facility in Washington, DC.

Government offices
Preceded by Robert M. White	2nd Administrator of the National Oceanic and Atmospheric Administration; 1977 – 1981	Succeeded by John V. Byrne
