= Donald Trump presidential campaign =

There have been four presidential campaigns waged by U.S. president Donald Trump. He ran for president once for the Reform Party (2000), and three times as a Republican (2016, 2020, 2024). He additionally mused about running on several other occasions such as for the 1988 and 2012 elections.

Donald Trump presidential campaign may refer to:

- Donald Trump 2000 presidential campaign, an unsuccessful campaign for the Reform Party resulting in him to withdraw from the race, with no running mate.
- Donald Trump 2016 presidential campaign, a successful election campaign resulting in him being elected the 45th president of the United States, with Mike Pence as running mate.
- Donald Trump 2020 presidential campaign, an unsuccessful re-election campaign, again with Pence as running mate.
- Donald Trump 2024 presidential campaign, a successful election campaign resulting in him being elected to a non-consecutive second term, as the 47th president of the United States, with JD Vance as running mate.
