= John A. Knauss =

American oceanographer

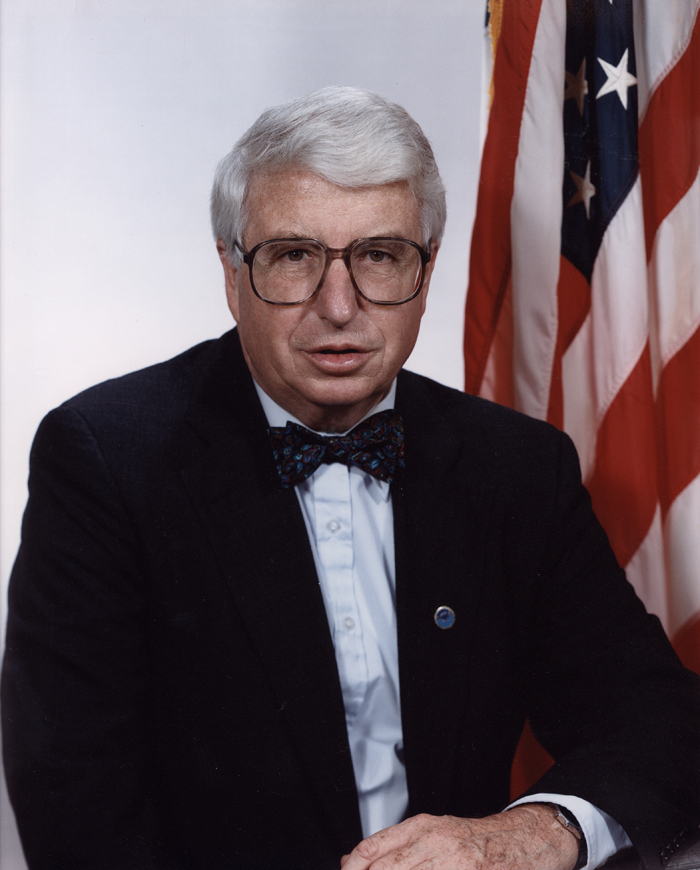

6th Under Secretary of Commerce for Oceans and Atmosphere 6th Administrator of the National Oceanic and Atmospheric Administration
- In office 1989–1993
- President: George H. W. Bush; Bill Clinton
- Preceded by: William Eugene Evans
- Succeeded by: D. James Baker

Personal details
- Born: September 1, 1925 Detroit, Michigan
- Died: November 19, 2015 (aged 90) Saunderstown, Rhode Island
- Education: Massachusetts Institute of Technology; University of Michigan; University of California
- Occupation: oceanographer, meteorologist, physicist, professor

John Atkinson Knauss (September 1, 1925 – November 19, 2015) was an American oceanographer, meteorologist and administrator of the National Oceanic and Atmospheric Administration (NOAA) from 1989 to 1993.

Knauss received a Bachelor of Science in meteorology from the Massachusetts Institute of Technology, a Master of Science from University of Michigan in physics, and a Ph.D. in oceanography from the Scripps Institution of Oceanography. While a graduate student, he made the first comprehensive measurements of the Pacific Equatorial Undercurrent. Knauss's PhD dissertation focused on the Equatorial Undercurrent in the Pacific Ocean, also known as the Cromwell Current. In 1962 he was appointed dean of the graduate school of oceanography at the University of Rhode Island, where he served until 1987.

Knauss and Athelstan Spilhaus, dean at University of Minnesota and head of the National Academy of Sciences Committee on Oceanography, worked to establish the National Sea Grant Program, cooperating with Senator Claiborne Pell, the sponsor of the National Sea Grant Program Act in 1966. The National Sea Grant College Program and Act was signed into law on October 15, 1966. The Sea Grant Knauss Fellowship, named in his honor, provides a unique educational and professional experience to graduate students who have an interest in ocean, coastal and Great Lakes resources and in the national policy decisions affecting those resources, matching highly qualified graduate students with "hosts" in the legislative and executive branch of government located in the Washington, D.C., area, for a one-year paid fellowship.

He served on the Stratton Commission that led to the creation of the National Oceanic and Atmospheric Administration in 1970, and from 1989 to 1993 was its administrator.

Knauss served as President of the American Geophysical Union from 1998 to 2000, and was awarded the Waldo E. Smith medal for "extraordinary service to geophysics" in 2006.

He resided in Saunderstown, Rhode Island and was professor emeritus at the University of Rhode Island. In 2015, he died after a period of declining health.

Government offices
Preceded by William Eugene Evans	6th Administrator of the National Oceanic and Atmospheric Administration; 1989 – 1993	Succeeded by D. James Baker
