= Pearson Hall (Miami University) =

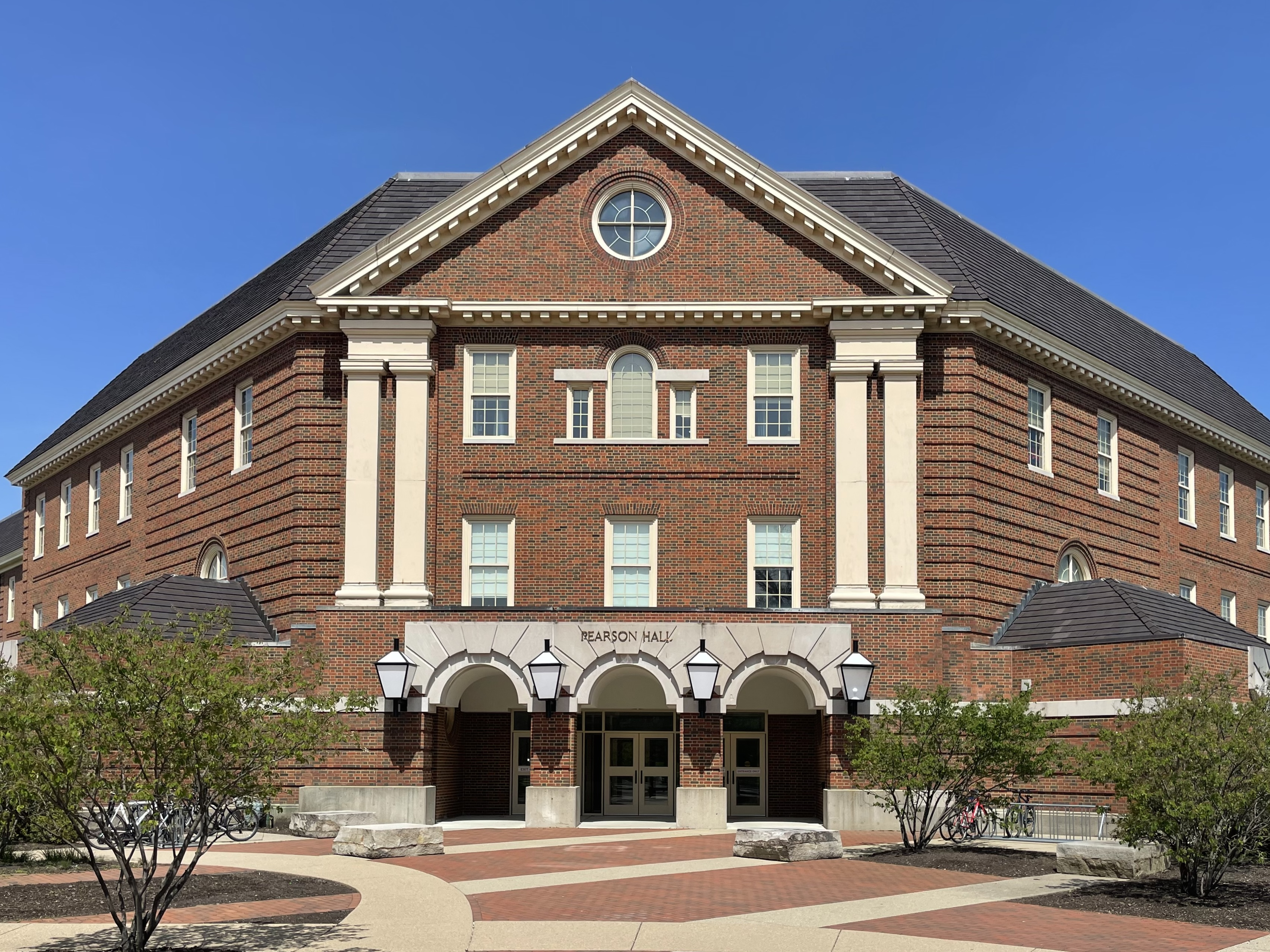
- Pearson Hall at Miami University in 2022
- Interactive map of the Pearson Hall area
- Former names: The Biological Sciences Building

General information
- Type: Academic Building
- Architectural style: Georgian
- Location: Oxford, Ohio, United States
- Coordinates: 39°30′38.53″N 84°43′52.62″W
- Construction started: 2 February 1984
- Inaugurated: 1 November 1986
- Cost: US$20,000,000

Technical details
- Floor area: 167,575 sq ft (15,568.2 m^{2}) gross

Design and construction
- Architects: Baxter, Hodell, Donnelly & Preston, Inc.
- Main contractor: Monarch Inc.

Website
- zoology.muohio.edu/zoo/about/facilities.html

Pearson Hall is the biological science building at Miami University in Oxford, Ohio. The building was originally known as The Biological Science Building (or "BSB"), and was renamed Pearson Hall as a dedication to Miami's 18th President. Prior to being a building, the area where Pearson Hall stands now was known as Miami Field, Miami University's original athletic field. The building caters to a wide range of different science departments including ecology, genetics, biology, and neuroscience. Some of the notable features of Pearson Hall are its Electron Microscope Facility and the Animal Care Facility. Pearson Hall also is home to two large aquatic Animal rooms used to replicate oceanic and freshwater environments. Another feature of Pearson is its instruments in the environmental and ecological toxicology department, which enables an array of different testing's and analysis to be conducted within the building. The Behavioral ecology department has a special laboratory used for hormonal analysis and behavioral testing. The entomology department contains an insect collection of over 82,000 specimens.

== History ==
=== Miami Field ===
The original site of Pearson Hall was known as Miami Field. This historic field became the main athletic field in 1895, when Miami trustees subleased four acres for twenty dollars from a botanical gardener. The field was cleared and a fence was constructed with a ticket box. A half-mile track was added, a baseball diamond, and a football field. In 1934 the Pageant of Miami was presented at Miami Field. Here hundreds of students acted out the timeline of Miami University. In 1945 during wartime Miami Field was used as a training camp for two professional baseball teams. In 1959 John F. Kennedy gave a speech at Miami Field for convocation. In October 1962, following a Miami victory against Purdue, students swarmed Miami field and tore up both of the goalposts to celebrate their victory. The goalposts were then raised in the middle of High Street. Miami Field continued to see use until Yager Stadium was constructed. It remained present on the campus regardless until February 2, 1984, when the groundbreaking for the construction of the Biological Science Building began.

=== Construction ===
In 1986 The Biological Sciences Building was constructed in the previous location of Miami Universities historic Miami Field. The Ribbon Cutting Ceremony was held at 8 AM, on November 1, 1986. The attendance included many Ohio government officials, professors, donors, and Miami Staff. After opening the building was used for a variety of different science departments.

In 1993 the Biological Sciences Building was later dedicated to Dr. Paul G. Pearson, who was the 18th president of Miami University. Dr. Pearson received the honor of having his name dedicated because the building was one of several major construction projects built during Pearson's presidency. Pearson Hall, being one of the more recently constructed buildings at Miami, paved the way for a complete restructuring of Miami's landscape. Following its erection in 1986, a new engineering building, psychology building, and the Farmer School of Business completed the “Academic Quadrangle” between Talawanda, Patterson, and High.

=== Dr. Paul G. Pearson ===
Dr. Paul G. Pearson was the 18th President of Miami University and who Pearson Hall was named after. He was born December 5, 1926, and Died on August 12, 2000. He was born in Lake Worth, Florida and received his bachelor's degree, masters, and doctorate from the University of Florida. Pearson began his work as an academic official at Rutgers, where he was a zoology professor for 26 years. He was also Rutgers president. He then went to Miami University in 1981 where he stayed until 1992.

== Structure ==
The groundbreaking of Pearson Hall began on February 2, 1984. It finished construction in 1985. The Hall opened for use in 1986. The total cost to build Pearson Hall was $20,000,000. The gross square feet of the building is 167,575 and was contracted by Monarch Inc.
