= D. James Baker =

American scientist

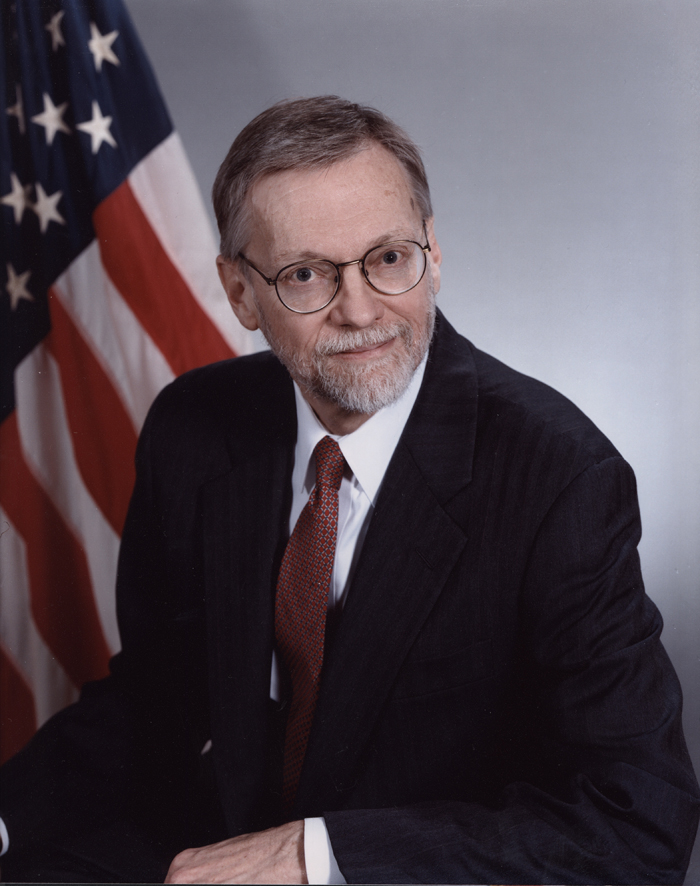

7th Under Secretary of Commerce for Oceans and Atmosphere 7th Administrator of the National Oceanic and Atmospheric Administration
- In office 1993–2001
- President: Bill Clinton
- Preceded by: John Knauss
- Succeeded by: Conrad Lautenbacher

Personal details
- Born: March 23, 1937 (age 89) Long Beach, California
- Education: Stanford University; Cornell University; University of Rhode Island
- Occupation: oceanographer, physicist, academic

Donald James Baker (born March 23, 1937) is an American scientist who was trained as a physicist, practiced as an oceanographer, and has held science and management positions in academia, non-profit institutions, and government agencies. He a former Under Secretary of Commerce for Atmosphere and Oceans and administrator of the U.S. National Oceanic and Atmospheric Administration (NOAA), and currently director, Global Carbon Measurement Program, William J. Clinton Foundation working with forestry programs and Land-Use Management in developing countries with the aim of reducing carbon dioxide emissions and at the same time helping alleviate poverty.

== Biography ==
Baker was born in Long Beach, California. He graduated from Stanford University with a B.S. degree in physics, and obtained his Ph.D. in experimental physics in 1962 from Cornell University. He was a post-doctoral fellow in oceanography at the University of Rhode Island under John Knauss, who later preceded Baker as Under Secretary of Commerce and administrator of NOAA. He was awarded a post-doctoral fellowship to work with Nobel Laureate Melvin Calvin at the Lawrence Berkeley Laboratory of the University of California on photosynthesis. In 1964, he moved to Harvard University, where he served as Assistant and Associate Professor of Oceanography. From Harvard, he joined the University of Washington in 1973, where he held a faculty position and co-founded and served as the first dean of the College of Ocean and Fishery Sciences. During that period he also served as a group leader for Deep-Sea Physics at NOAA's Pacific Marine Environmental Laboratory. In 1983, he moved to Washington, D.C. where he served as President of Joint Oceanographic Institutions, Incorporated, managing the international Ocean Drilling Program and coordinating an ocean community effort on oceanography from space with NASA. He was appointed by President William J. Clinton as Under Secretary of Commerce and administrator of the National Oceanic and Atmospheric Administration in 1993 and served until 2001, the longest tenure of any person in that position to date. During that period he also served a co-chair of the interagency Committee on Environment and Natural Resources, an ex officio member of the President's Council on Sustainable Development, and as the U.S. Whaling Commissioner, as well as serving briefly as chair of the Council on Environmental Quality. In 2002, he became the president and chief executive officer of the Academy of Natural Sciences in Philadelphia, established in 1812 and the oldest natural history museum in the western hemisphere. He has served as a science and management consultant to the Intergovernmental Oceanographic Commission of UNESCO in Paris, France and to the H. John Heinz Center for Science, Economics, and the Environment in Washington, D.C. He joined the Clinton Foundation in 2007. He currently holds faculty appointments at the University of Pennsylvania, the University of Delaware, and is a visiting senior fellow at the Center for the Analysis of Time Series at the London School of Economics and Political Science. Over almost the last two decades he has been an advisor to former Vice President Al Gore and he has given advice on the Oscar-winning film An Inconvenient Truth.

Baker has published more than 150 scientific and policy papers, reviews, and reports in oceanography, climate, observation technology, and sustainable development. He has joined oceanographic expeditions to many parts of the world and is the co-holder of a U.S. patent on the design of a deep-sea pressure gauge which was used to make the first deep-sea tide measurement in the Antarctic Ocean. He is the author of the book Planet Earth: The View from Space, which was published by Harvard University Press. Baker is one of co-founders and first president of The Oceanography Society, an elected member of the American Philosophical Society, and a fellow of the American Meteorological Society and the American Association for the Advancement of Science. He has served as the B. Benjamin Zucker Environmental Fellow at Yale University. In 2008 he was awarded the Lifetime Achievement Award by Oceanology International for his "contribution to oceanography and marine science, and in 1998 the Government of India awarded him the Vikram Sarabhai Medal for his "outstanding contributions to space research in developing countries". He has been awarded two honorary degrees. He lectures regularly on the subjects of sustainability, climate change, and oceanography, has chaired numerous national and international advisory committees, and has testified frequently to the U.S. Congress.

Government offices
Preceded by John A. Knauss	7th Administrator of the National Oceanic and Atmospheric Administration; 1993 – 2001	Succeeded by Conrad C. Lautenbacher
