= Joel Myers =

American businessman and meteorologist

- Born: Joel Norman Myers; November 3, 1939 (age 87); Philadelphia, Pennsylvania, US
- Education: Pennsylvania State University
- Occupations: Meteorologist, founder and executive chairman of AccuWeather

Joel Norman Myers (born November 3, 1939) is an American meteorologist and businessman who is the founder and executive chairman of AccuWeather, a U.S.-based commercial weather service and media company.

He earned his bachelor’s, master’s, and doctoral degrees in meteorology from Penn State in 1961, 1963, and 1971, respectively.

== Early life and education ==
Myers is a native of Philadelphia, Pennsylvania. Myers developed an interest in meteorology at an early age, becoming fascinated by snowstorms and their effects on daily life. At age seven, he began keeping a daily weather diary and tracking weather patterns, and by age 15 he was submitting local weather observations to a Philadelphia television meteorologist. He is a graduate of Central High School, and was inducted into the CHS Hall of Fame in March 1998.

== Career ==
Myers founded AccuWeather in State College, Pennsylvania, in 1962 while a second-year graduate student in meteorology at Penn State. He launched AccuWeather with one client and grew the company to a revenue of more than $100 million.

Myers was on the faculty of Penn State from 1964 until 1981 as instructor, lecturer, and assistant professor; he estimates that by the time he retired from teaching, he had taught weather forecasting to approximately 17% of all practicing meteorologists in the United States. Additionally, he was on the Pennsylvania State University board of trustees for 33 years, and continues as an Emeritus Trustee. In 2016, he received the University's highest honor, the Distinguished Alumni Award. Myers was the 2017 Renaissance Fund honoree.

Myers received the American Meteorological Society’s 2018 Award for Outstanding Contributions to the Advancement of Applied Meteorology, and the National Weather Association’s 2017 Lifetime Achievement Award, in addition to numerous other accolades. He is a trustee of the board of directors for the Committee for Economic Development (CED), where he is also on the education subcommittee, and he is a Fellow of the Nantucket Project.

In 2007, Myers appointed his younger brother, Barry Lee Myers, a business attorney, as AccuWeather's chief executive officer. The younger Myers was nominated by President Donald Trump to head the National Oceanic and Atmospheric Administration in October 2017. Myers returned as CEO in 2019 following his brother's departure from the company. In June 2023, Myers stepped down as CEO to become Founder and Executive Chair.

== Publications ==
In 2024, Myers published Invisible Iceberg: When Climate and Weather Shaped History. The book covers the impact of weather and climate on world events throughout history. It was released at the World Economic Forum in Davos, Switzerland. The book was released in paperback in 2025.

In September 2024, AccuWeather launched Invisible Iceberg, a documentary series based on Myers' book of the same name. The series, co-hosted by Myers and AccuWeather chief on-air meteorologist Bernie Rayno, examines the influence of weather and climate on historical events.

Myers has published dozens of papers in various scientific journals, including Scientific American and the Journal of Applied Meteorology.

== Philanthropy ==
Myers has made several philanthropic contributions to Pennsylvania State University, including a multimillion-dollar gift to the College of Earth and Mineral Sciences for the Joel N. Myers Weather Center, and funding for scholarships in meteorology and in information sciences and technology. He has also supported the installation of weather-themed sculptures on campus, including sundials at the Nittany Lion Inn and the Arboretum at Penn State, and the Nittany Lion weather vane atop Beaver Stadium.

In 2015, Myers founded the Dads' Resource Center, located in State College, Pennsylvania, which provides education, resources and advocacy for single fathers.

He also supported the Team Pennsylvania Foundation, the YMCA, the Jewish Community Center, the Make-A-Wish Foundation, and the American Cancer Society.

== Affiliations ==
Myers is a regular participant in the invitation-only Yale CEO Summit and the CEO Center. He is also a member of the Washington Post Intelligence Council.

== Controversies ==
The Office of Federal Contract Compliance Programs compiled a report by federal investigators that started after a complaint filed September 6, 2016, alleging a "hostile work environment and termination based on sexual orientation and sex." Joel Myers, who was president of AccuWeather during the period covered by the agreement, signed a settlement where AccuWeather agrees to pay out $290,000 to at least 39 women, institute in-person training for managers to identify harassment, and send harassment complaints to a 3rd party till at least 2018.
