= List of Department of Commerce appointments by Donald Trump =

Key
Appointees serving in offices that did not require Senate confirmation.
Appointees confirmed by the Senate who are currently serving or served through the entire term.
Appointees awaiting Senate confirmation.
Appointees serving in an acting capacity.
Appointees who have left office after confirmation or offices which have been disbanded.
Nominees who were withdrawn prior to being confirmed or assuming office.

== Appointments (first administration) ==
Office	Nominee	Assumed office	Left office
Secretary of Commerce	Wilbur Ross	February 28, 2017 (Confirmed February 27, 2017, 72–27)	January 20, 2021
Deputy Secretary of Commerce	Karen Dunn Kelley	November 29, 2018 (Confirmed November 28, 2018, 62–38)	January 20, 2021
Deputy Secretary of Commerce	Karen Dunn Kelley	November 29, 2017	November 29, 2018
Deputy Secretary of Commerce	Todd Ricketts	Nomination withdrawn by the President on April 25, 2017	
Office of the Secretary & Deputy Secretary
General Counsel of Commerce	Matthew J. Walsh	Nomination lapsed and returned to the President on January 3, 2021	
General Counsel of Commerce	Matthew J. Walsh	August 2019	January 20, 2021
General Counsel of Commerce	Peter B. Davidson	August 2017 (Confirmed August 3, 2017, voice vote)	August 2019
Assistant Secretary of Commerce (Administration)	Tom Gilman	January 2019 (Confirmed January 2, 2019, voice vote)	January 20, 2021
Chief Financial Officer of Commerce	Tom Gilman	January 2019 (Confirmed January 2, 2019, voice vote)	January 20, 2021
Assistant Secretary of Commerce (Legislative and Intergovernmental Affairs)	Daniel Huff	Nomination lapsed and returned to the President on January 3, 2021	
Assistant Secretary of Commerce (Legislative and Intergovernmental Affairs)	Michael Platt Jr.	October 18, 2017 (Confirmed August 3, 2017, voice vote)	May 9, 2019
Assistant Secretary of Commerce (Economic Development)	John Fleming	March 15, 2019 (Confirmed March 7, 2019, 67–30)	January 20, 2021
Assistant Secretary of Commerce (Communications and Information)	David Redl	November 21, 2017 (Confirmed November 7, 2017, voice vote)	May 9, 2019
Director of the Minority Business Development Agency	Chris Garcia	May 22, 2017	February 27, 2018
Office of Economic Affairs
Under Secretary of Commerce (Economic Affairs)	Mary A. Toman	Nomination lapsed and returned to the President on January 3, 2021	
Under Secretary of Commerce (Economic Affairs)	Karen Dunn Kelley	September 22, 2017 (Confirmed August 3, 2017, voice vote)	November 28, 2018
Director of the Census	Steven Dillingham	January 7, 2019 (Confirmed January 2, 2019, voice vote)	January 20, 2021
Director of the Census	Ron S. Jarmin	June 30, 2017	January 7, 2019
Office of Industry and Security
Under Secretary of Commerce (Industry and Security)	Nazakhtar Nikakhtar	Nomination lapsed and returned to the President on January 3, 2021	
Under Secretary of Commerce (Industry and Security)	Mira Ricardel	September 11, 2017 (Confirmed August 3, 2017, voice vote)	May 14, 2018
Assistant Secretary of Commerce (Export Administration)	Richard Ashooh	September 11, 2017 (Confirmed August 3, 2017, voice vote)	July 16, 2020
Assistant Secretary of Commerce (Export Enforcement)	Jeffrey Nadaner	Nomination withdrawn by the President on June 12, 2019	
Office of International Trade
Under Secretary of Commerce (International Trade)	Gilbert Kaplan	March 20, 2018 (Confirmed March 3, 2018, voice vote)	September 19, 2019
Assistant Secretary of Commerce (Industry and Analysis)	Nazakhtar Nikakhtar	April 3, 2018 (Confirmed March 19, 2018, voice vote)	January 20, 2021
Assistant Secretary of Commerce (Global Markets) and Director General of the United States Commercial Service	Ian Steff	November 2019 (Confirmed November 21, 2019, voice vote)	January 20, 2021
Assistant Secretary of Commerce (Global Markets) and Director General of the United States Commercial Service	Ian Steff	May 3, 2018	November 2019
Assistant Secretary of Commerce (Global Markets) and Director General of the United States Commercial Service	Elizabeth Erin Walsh	August 17, 2017 (Confirmed August 3, 2017, voice vote)	May 3, 2018
Assistant Secretary of Commerce (Enforcement and Compliance)	Jeffrey I. Kessler	April 11, 2019 (Confirmed April 3, 2019, voice vote)	January 20, 2021
Office of Oceans & Atmosphere and the National Oceanic and Atmospheric Administration
Under Secretary of Commerce (Oceans and Atmosphere) and the Administrator of the National Oceanic and Atmospheric Administration	Neil Jacobs	Nomination lapsed and returned to the President on January 3, 2021	
Under Secretary of Commerce (Oceans and Atmosphere) and the Administrator of the National Oceanic and Atmospheric Administration	Neil Jacobs	February 25, 2019	January 20, 2021
Under Secretary of Commerce (Oceans and Atmosphere) and the Administrator of the National Oceanic and Atmospheric Administration	Timothy Gallaudet	October 25, 2017	February 24, 2019
Under Secretary of Commerce (Oceans and Atmosphere) and the Administrator of the National Oceanic and Atmospheric Administration	Barry Lee Myers	Nomination withdrawn by the President on December 2, 2019	
Assistant Secretary of Commerce (Environmental Observation and Prediction)	Neil Jacobs	March 2, 2018 (Confirmed February 15, 2018, voice vote)	January 20, 2021
Assistant Secretary of Commerce (Oceans and Atmosphere)	Timothy Gallaudet	October 25, 2017 (Confirmed October 5, 2017, voice vote)	January 20, 2021
Other Under Secretaries
Under Secretary of Commerce (Intellectual Property)	Andrei Iancu	February 8, 2018 (Confirmed February 5, 2018, 94–0)	January 20, 2021
Director of the United States Patent and Trademark Office	Andrei Iancu	February 8, 2018 (Confirmed February 5, 2018, 94–0)	January 20, 2021
Under Secretary of Commerce (Standards and Technology)	Walter Copan	October 16, 2017 (Confirmed October 5, 2017, voice vote)	January 20, 2021
Director of the National Institute of Standards and Technology	Walter Copan	October 16, 2017 (Confirmed October 5, 2017, voice vote)	January 20, 2021

== Appointments (second administration) ==
Office	Nominee	Assumed office	Left office
Secretary of Commerce	Howard Lutnick	February 21, 2025 (Confirmed February 18, 2025, 51–45)	
Secretary of Commerce	Jeremy Pelter	January 20, 2025	February 21, 2025
Deputy Secretary of Commerce	Paul Dabbar	June 26, 2025 (Confirmed June 25, 2025, 56-40)	
Deputy Secretary of Commerce	Jeremy Pelter	February 21, 2025	June 26, 2025
General Counsel of Commerce	Pierre Gentin	October 13, 2025 (Confirmed* October 7, 2025, 51–47); *En bloc confirmation of 107 nominees.	April 24, 2026
Under Secretary of Commerce for Oceans and Atmosphere	Neil Jacobs	November 14, 2025 (Confirmed* October 7, 2025, 51–47); *En bloc confirmation of 107 nominees.	
Under Secretary of Commerce for Oceans and Atmosphere	Laura Grimm	March 31, 2025	November 14, 2025
Under Secretary of Commerce for Oceans and Atmosphere	Nancy Hann	January 20, 2025	March 31, 2025
Under Secretary of Commerce for Industry and Security	Jeffrey I. Kessler	March 20, 2025 (Confirmed March 13, 2025, 54–45)	
Under Secretary of Commerce for International Trade	William Kimmitt	August 8, 2025 (Confirmed July 29, 2025, 51–47)	
Under Secretary of Commerce for International Trade	Trevor Kellogg	January 20, 2025	August 8, 2025
Under Secretary of Commerce for Intellectual Property	John A. Squires	September 22, 2025 (Confirmed* September 18, 2025, 51–44); *En bloc confirmation of 48 nominees.	
Under Secretary of Commerce for Intellectual Property	Coke Morgan Stewart	January 20, 2025	September 22, 2025
Under Secretary of Commerce for Economic Affairs	Joyce Meyer	January 8, 2026 (Confirmed* December 18, 2025, 53–43); *En bloc confirmation of 97 nominees.	
Under Secretary of Commerce for Standards and Technology	Arvind Raman	June 30, 2026 (Confirmed* May 18, 2026, 46–43); *En bloc confirmation of 49 nominees.	
Assistant Secretary of Commerce for Communications and Information	Arielle Roth	July 30, 2025 (Confirmed July 23, 2025, 52–41)	
Assistant Secretary of Commerce for Legislative and Intergovernmental Affairs	Harry Kumar	February 6, 2026 (Confirmed* December 18, 2025, 53–43); *En bloc confirmation of 97 nominees.	
Assistant Secretary of Commerce for Global Markets and Director of the United States General Commercial Service	David Fogel	October 15, 2025 (Confirmed* October 7, 2025, 51–47); *En bloc confirmation of 107 nominees.	
Assistant Secretary of Commerce for Export Administration	Abby Warren	Awaiting Senate Confirmation	
Assistant Secretary of Commerce for Export Administration	Landon Heid	Nomination withdrawn by the President on September 10, 2025	
Assistant Secretary of Commerce for Exports Enforcement	David Peters	October 15, 2025 (Confirmed* October 7, 2025, 51–47); *En bloc confirmation of 107 nominees.	
Assistant Secretary of Commerce for Environmental Observations and Prediction	Taylor Jordan	November 14, 2025 (Confirmed* October 7, 2025, 51–47); *En bloc confirmation of 107 nominees.	
Assistant Secretary of Commerce for Industry and Analysis	Steven Haines	June 3, 2026 (Confirmed* May 18, 2026, 46–43); *En bloc confirmation of 49 nominees.	
Assistant Secretary of Commerce for Industry and Analysis	David Rader	Nomination withdrawn by the President on July 17, 2025	
Assistant Secretary of Commerce for Oceans and Atmosphere	Timothy Petty	January 15, 2026 (Confirmed* December 18, 2025, 53–43); *En bloc confirmation of 97 nominees.	
Assistant Secretary of Commerce for Enforcement and Compliance	Christopher Abbott	Awaiting Senate Confirmation	

== Notes ==
=== Confirmation votes ===
Confirmations by roll call vote (first administration)

Confirmations by voice vote (first administration)

Confirmations by roll call vote (second administration)

Confirmations by voice vote (second administration)
