= Manson K. Brown =

US Coast Guard commander

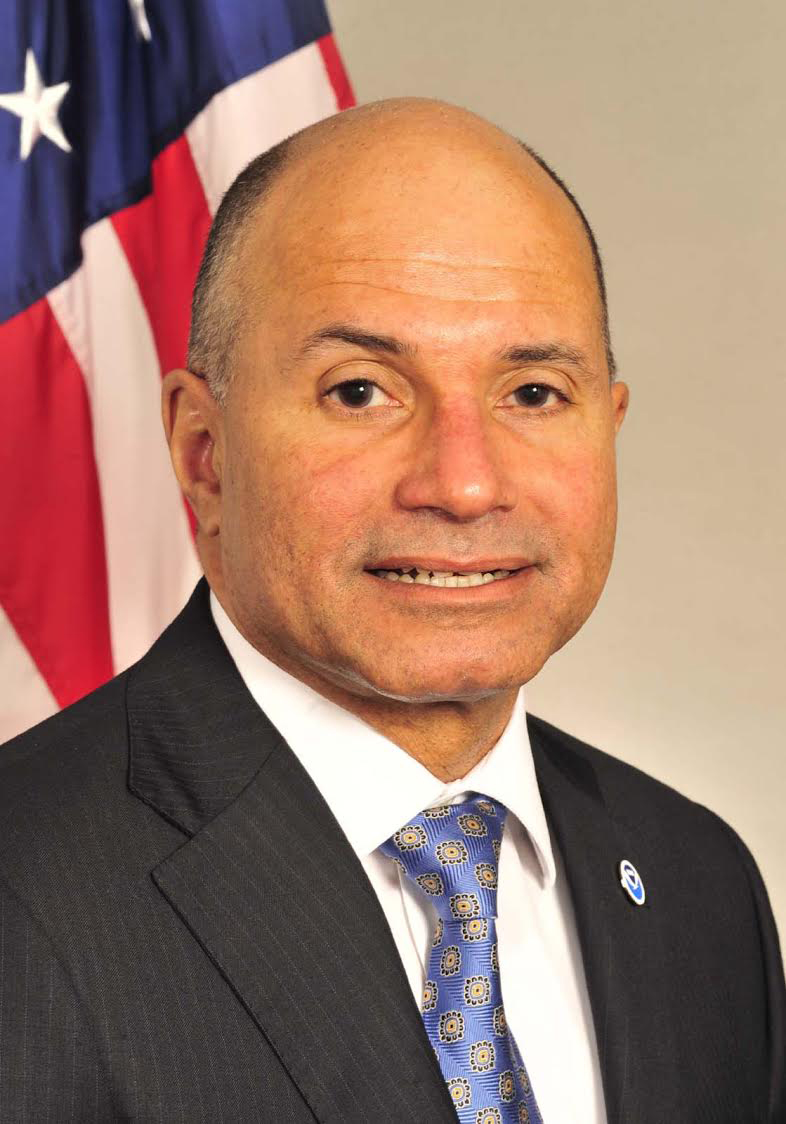

Under Secretary of Commerce for Oceans and Atmosphere Administrator of the National Oceanic and Atmospheric Administration Acting
- In office January 20, 2017 (approximately two hours) (Note: Brown served as Acting Under Secretary of Commerce for Oceans and Atmosphere and Acting Administrator of the National Oceanic and Atmospheric Administration (NOAA) in his capacity as Assistant Secretary of Commerce for Environmental Observation and Prediction and Deputy Administrator of the National Oceanic and Atmospheric Administration (NOAA) for approximately two hours on January 20, 2017 from the time of the formal resignation of Kathryn D. Sullivan as Under Secretary of Commerce for Oceans and Atmosphere and Administrator of the National Oceanic and Atmospheric Administration (NOAA) at noon on January 20, 2017 until the time of the formal appointment of Deputy Under Secretary of Commerce for Operations (DUSO) of the National Oceanic and Atmospheric Administration (NOAA) Benjamin Friedman as Acting Under Secretary of Commerce for Oceans and Atmosphere and Acting Administrator of the National Oceanic and Atmospheric Administration (NOAA) in the early afternoon on January 20, 2017 pursuant to Department Organization Order (DOO) 10-15 and the Federal Vacancies Reform Act of 1998.)
- President: Donald Trump
- Preceded by: Kathryn D. Sullivan
- Succeeded by: Benjamin Friedman (acting)

Assistant Secretary of Commerce for Environmental Observation and Prediction Deputy Administrator of the National Oceanic and Atmospheric Administration
- In office March 18, 2015 – January 20, 2017
- President: Barack Obama
- Succeeded by: Neil Jacobs

Deputy Commandant for Mission Support
- In office May 25, 2010 – May 30, 2014
- President: Barack Obama

Personal details
- Born: Manson Kevin Brown; July 23, 1956 (age 70) Washington, District of Columbia, U.S.
- Military career
- Spouse: Herminia Brown
- Relatives: 3 children
- Allegiance: United States of America
- Branch: United States Coast Guard
- Service years: 1978-2014
- Rank: Vice Admiral
- Commands: Deputy Commandant for Mission Support; Coast Guard Pacific Area; Fourteenth Coast Guard District; MLC, Pacific
- Conflicts: September 11 attacks Global war on terrorism Operation Iraqi Freedom
- Awards: Coast Guard Distinguished Service Medal; Secretary of Transportation Outstanding Achievement Medal; Legion of Merit; Meritorious Service Medal; Coast Guard Commendation Medal; Coast Guard Achievement Medal; Iraq Campaign Medal

Manson Kevin Brown (born July 23, 1956) is an American retired U.S. Coast Guard Vice Admiral (VADM) and public official. His top military decoration is the Coast Guard Distinguished Service Medal. In 1994, he became the first recipient of the Coast Guard Captain John G. Witherspoon Award for Inspirational Leadership. In 2012, he was honored with the Golden Torch Award by the National Society for Black Engineers. In 2014, he was honored by the National Association for the Advancement of Colored People with the Meritorious Service Award, an honor annually bestowed to a service member in a policy-making position for the highest achievement in military equal opportunity. Off duty, he is an active road cyclist.

== Early life and education ==
Brown was born in Washington, DC on July 23, 1956. He graduated in 1978 from the U.S. Coast Guard Academy with a Bachelor of Science degree in Civil Engineering. He also holds Master of Science degrees in Civil Engineering from the University of Illinois at Urbana–Champaign and National Resources Strategy from the Industrial College of the Armed Forces. He is a registered professional civil engineer.

== Career ==
=== U.S. Coast Guard ===
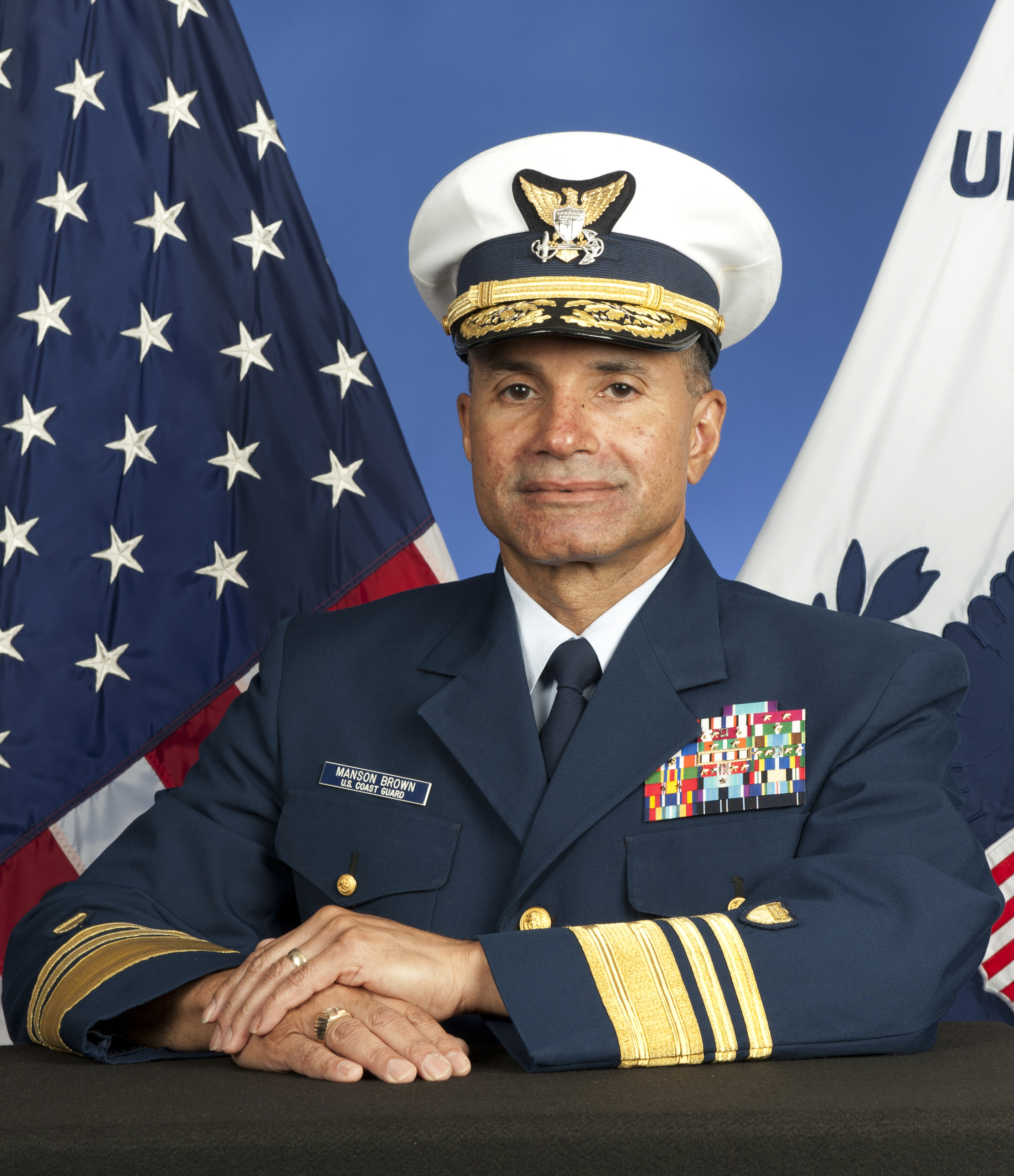
U.S. Coast Guard VADM Manson K. Brown, as Deputy Commandant for Mission Support.

VADM Brown’s commands include Coast Guard Pacific Area, the Fourteenth Coast Guard District, Maintenance and Logistics Command Pacific, Sector Honolulu, and Group Charleston. From 1999 to 2002, he served as the Military Assistant to the U.S. Secretary of Transportation, including duty as the Acting Deputy Chief of Staff for six months after the terrorist attacks of September 11, 2001. In May 2003, he served as the Chief of Officer Personnel Management at the Coast Guard Personnel Command. From April to July 2004, he was temporarily assigned as the Senior Advisor for Transportation to the Coalition Provisional Authority in Baghdad, Iraq. Working in a combat zone, he oversaw restoration of Iraq’s major transportation systems, including two major ports.

Previous tours of duty include Assistant Engineering Officer aboard the icebreaker Glacier, Project Engineer at Civil Engineering Unit Miami, Deputy Group Commander at Coast Guard Group Mayport, Engineering Assignment Officer in the Officer Personnel Division at Coast Guard Headquarters, Facilities Engineer at Support Center Alameda, and Assistant Chief, Civil Engineering Division at Maintenance and Logistics Command Pacific. He commanded operations at every level, culminating as Commander of Coast Guard Pacific Area in Alameda, California where he oversaw all Coast Guard operational activities throughout the Pacific Rim. Building on his technical competence as a registered professional civil engineer, his last assignment on active duty was as Deputy Commandant for Mission Support in Washington, DC, where he oversaw all aspects of human resources, engineering, information technology, acquisition, and logistics support for Coast Guard operations and people throughout the globe. VADM Brown retired from the Coast Guard in May, 2014.

=== Commerce Department ===
VADM Brown was sworn in as the Assistant Secretary of Commerce for Environmental Observation and Prediction on March 18, 2015. In this role he strategically drove administration policy, programming, and investments for all NOAA observing systems, including in situ instruments and satellites, and the process of converting observations to predictions for environmental threats related to weather, climate, water, oceans, and space weather. He served as NOAA Deputy Administrator and Chair of NOAA’s Observing Systems Council. Brown also served as Acting Under Secretary of Commerce for Oceans and Atmosphere and Acting Administrator of the National Oceanic and Atmospheric Administration (NOAA) in his capacity as Assistant Secretary of Commerce for Environmental Observation and Prediction and Deputy Administrator of the National Oceanic and Atmospheric Administration (NOAA) for approximately two hours on January 20, 2017 from the time of the formal resignation of Kathryn D. Sullivan as Under Secretary of Commerce for Oceans and Atmosphere and Administrator of the National Oceanic and Atmospheric Administration (NOAA) at noon on January 20, 2017 until the time of the formal appointment of Deputy Under Secretary of Commerce for Operations (DUSO) of the National Oceanic and Atmospheric Administration (NOAA) Benjamin Friedman as Acting Under Secretary of Commerce for Oceans and Atmosphere and Acting Administrator of the National Oceanic and Atmospheric Administration (NOAA) in the early afternoon on January 20, 2017 pursuant to Department Organization Order (DOO) 10-15 and the Federal Vacancies Reform Act of 1998. His service ended on January 20, 2017 with the end of the Obama Administration and Brown retired from National Oceanic and Atmospheric Administration (NOAA).

== Awards and decorations ==
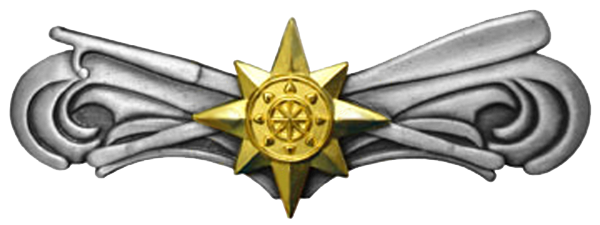

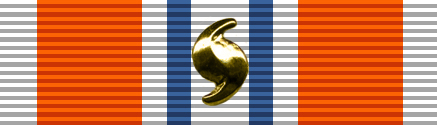

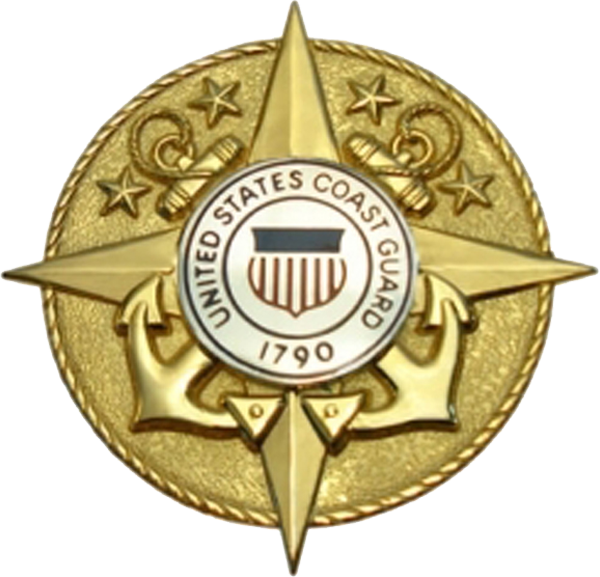
