= Peter Davidson =

Peter Davidson may refer to:

- Peter B. Davidson, General Counsel of the United States Department of Commerce
- Peter Davidson (footballer) (1963–2024), Australian rules footballer
- Peter Wylie Davidson (1870–1963), Scottish sculptor and silversmith
- Pete Davidson (born 1993), American comedian
  - "Pete Davidson" (song), Ariana Grande song
- Peter Davidson (1837–1915), Scottish occultist and Freemason Hermetic Brotherhood of Luxor
- Peter Davidson (architect), co-founder of Lab Architecture Studio
- Peter Davidson, comic artist on Desperate Dan
- Peter H. Davidson Jr., state legislator in Florida (List of African-American officeholders (1865–1899))

== See also ==
- Peter Davison (disambiguation)
