= Peter Davison (disambiguation) =

Peter Davison (born 1951) is a British actor.

Peter Davison may also refer to:

- Peter Davison (composer) (born 1948), American new age composer
- Peter Davison (footballer) (born 1944), Australian rules footballer
- Peter Davison (poet) (1928–2004), American poet
- Peter Davison (literary scholar) (1926–2022), professor of English and biographer
- Peter Michael Davison, British composer, orchestrator, arranger and conductor
- Peter Weimer Davison (1869–1920), American general

== See also ==
- Peter Davidson (disambiguation)
