= Timothy Gallaudet =

American oceanographer (born 1967)

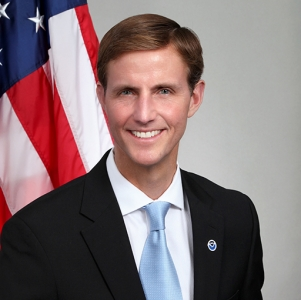
- Gallaudet in 2017

Assistant Secretary of Commerce for Oceans and Atmosphere
- In office October 25, 2017 – January 20, 2021
- President: Donald Trump
- Preceded by: Mark E. Schaefer
- Succeeded by: Benjamin Friedman (acting)

Acting Under Secretary of Commerce for Oceans and Atmosphere and Acting Administrator of National Oceanic and Atmospheric Administration
- In office October 25, 2017 – February 24, 2019
- President: Donald Trump
- Preceded by: Benjamin Friedman (acting)
- Succeeded by: Neil Jacobs (acting)

Personal details
- Born: March 18, 1967 (age 59) Hollywood, California, U.S.
- Education: United States Naval Academy (BS); Scripps Institution of Oceanography (MS, PhD)
- Scientific career
- Fields: Oceanography
- Workplaces: U.S. Navy
- Thesis: Shallow water acoustic backscatter and reverberation measurements using a 68-kHz cylindrical array (2001)
- Doctoral advisor: Christian de Moustier
- Military career
- Allegiance: United States
- Branch: United States Navy
- Service years: 1985–2017
- Rank: Rear admiral
- Commands: Naval Meteorology and Oceanography Command

Timothy Cole Gallaudet is an American oceanographer and retired Rear Admiral in the United States Navy. Gallaudet worked for the U.S. Department of Commerce as the Acting Under Secretary of Commerce for Oceans and Atmosphere and Acting Administrator of the National Oceanic and Atmospheric Administration (NOAA). As of 2024 he is the CEO of Ocean STL Consulting, LLC., and hosts The American Blue Economy Podcast.

He became a prominent member of the UFO community. He says he has seen footage of unidentified anomalous phenomena (UAP) and unidentified submerged objects (USO) while on active duty in the U.S. Navy, and has expressed support for David Grusch's whistleblower claims in US Congress, calling for the "de-stigmatization" of the subject across science, the military and the general public. He is on the advisory board of Americans for Safe Aerospace, which describes itself as a "military pilot-led nonprofit organization focused on UAP". He is a research affiliate with Avi Loeb's The Galileo Project that searches for evidence of extraterrestrial technological artifacts.

Gallaudet has long been a fan of the paranormal and mediums like The Long Island Medium. He has filmed flying orbs in his home, and his daughter, who he believes has paranormal abilities, appeared on the "You Will Be Mine" episode of The Dead Files in 2016.

== Early life and education ==
Gallaudet was born on March 18, 1967, in Hollywood, California. He received a Bachelor of Science degree in oceanography from the United States Naval Academy and was commissioned as an ensign in the United States Navy in 1989. After leaving Annapolis, Gallaudet went directly to the Scripps Institution of Oceanography, receiving a Master of Science degree in oceanography in 1991. Gallaudet served in various naval assignments before returning to Scripps for his doctoral studies in 1997 under the direction of Christian de Moustier. He received his Ph.D. in 2001, then returned to active duty.

== Naval service ==
Gallaudet was Oceanographer of the Navy and Commander of the Naval Meteorology and Oceanography Command. He has experience in weather and ocean forecasting, hydrographic surveying, developing policy and plans to counter illegal, unregulated, and unreported fishing, and assessing the national security impacts of climate change.

Gallaudet served for two years aboard the USS Kitty Hawk (CV-63), where he was officer of the deck and Meteorology and Oceanography Division Officer. From 2003 to 2005, Gallaudet served under Commander, Naval Meteorology and Oceanography Command at Stennis Space Center in Mississippi as the plans and programs officer. He was later program manager for Anti-submarine warfare (ASW), and commanding officer of the Naval Oceanography Special Warfare Center. In this role, he established the first Navy SEAL program for unmanned aerial and underwater vehicles and other sensors to detect and locate enemy forces.

In 2008, Gallaudet served on the Chief of Naval Operations (CNO) Staff as Deputy Navigator of the Navy. Gallaudet was the Superintendent/Commanding Officer of the Naval Observatory from 2011 to 2013, after which he returned to the CNO staff, ultimately serving as the Head Oceanographer of the Navy, Hydrographer of the Navy, and Commander of the Naval Meteorology and Oceanography Command (CNMOC) at the Stennis Space Center.

Gallaudet retired from the Navy in July 2017.

== NOAA service ==
On October 25, 2017, after being confirmed by the U.S. Senate, Gallaudet took office as Assistant Secretary of Commerce for Oceans and Atmosphere within the U.S. Department of Commerce. In this position, he fulfilled the role of Acting Under Secretary of Commerce for Oceans and Atmosphere and Acting Administrator of the National Oceanic and Atmospheric Administration. During his time at NOAA, Gallaudet led the agency's Blue Economy activities, aiming to advance marine transportation, sustainable seafood production, ocean exploration and mapping and marine tourism.

In February 2019, Gallaudet was replaced as Acting NOAA Administrator by Neil Jacobs, remaining as the Assistant Secretary of Commerce for Oceans and Atmosphere.

== Ocean STL Consulting, LLC. ==
Gallaudet is head of Ocean STL Consulting, LLC, an agency offering consulting on leadership direction and pursued partnerships.

== Awards ==
Military/Federal
US Coast Guard Distinguished Public Service Award
Legion of Merit (2)
Meritorious Service Medal (3)
Navy and Marine Corps Commendation Medal (5)
Navy and Marine Corps Achievement Medal
Joint Unit Commendation Medal
Meritorious Unit Commendation Medal
Navy Unit Commendation Medal
Humanitarian Service Medal
Global War of Terror Service Medal
Southwest Asia Service Medal
National Defense Service Medal
Professional
Commander, Naval Air Forces Leadership Award, 2002
Academic
UC San Diego Distinguished Alumni Award, 2016

Government offices
| Preceded by Benjamin Friedman (acting); Kathryn D. Sullivan | Acting Administrator of the National Oceanic and Atmospheric Administration; 2017 – 2019 | Succeeded by Neil Jacobs (acting) |
