= NOAA Chief Scientist =

NOAA Chief Scientist of National Oceanic and Atmospheric Administration

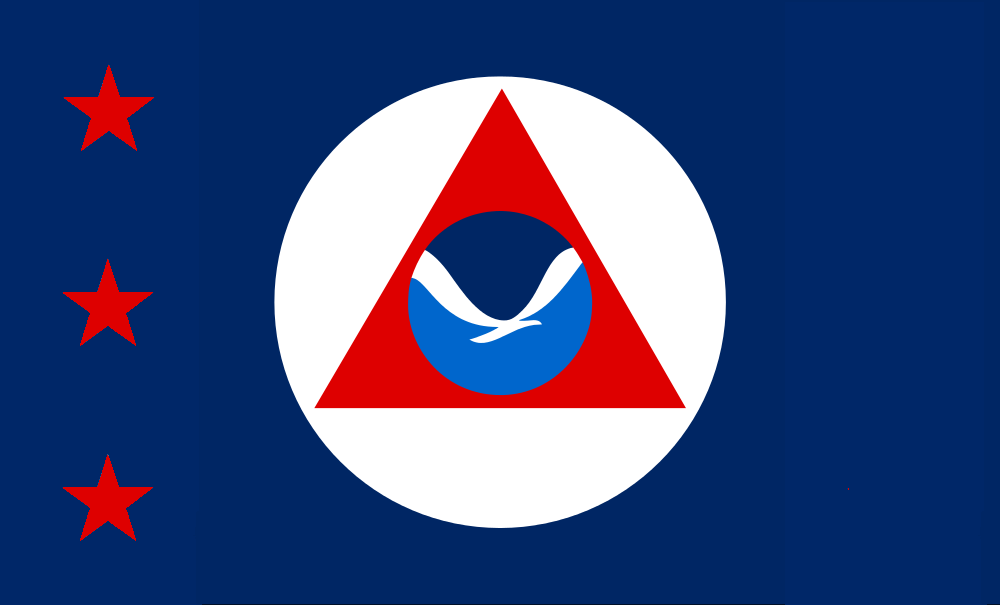

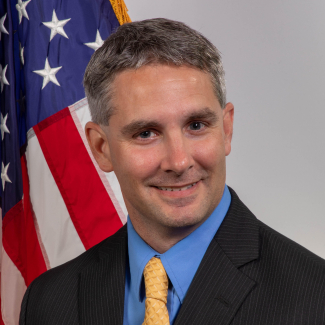
- Incumbent; Steven Thur, Ph.D. since August 2025
- Reports to: National Oceanic and Atmospheric Administration Administrator
- Nominator: President of the United States
- First holder: Sylvia Earle

Chief Scientist is the most senior science position at the National Oceanic and Atmospheric Administration (NOAA). They are responsible for safeguarding the health of the nation's waters and advancing policy and program direction for NOAA's science and technology programs. In July 2022, the 117th Congress passed the NOAA Chief Scientist Act revising the qualifications and responsibilities of the position.

== Deepwater Horizon controversy ==
The position of NOAA Chief Scientist went vacant from 1996 until 2009 when Congress reestablished the position. Then President Barack Obama nominated geochemist Scott Doney in August 2010, but his nomination was blocked by Louisiana Republican Senator David Vitter. The senator blocked several Obama scientific appointments because the administration was holding up the issuing of deepwater exploration permits. This fight lasted until 2012 when the administration withdrew the appointment.

== Hurricane Dorian–Alabama controversy ==
In September 2019 Hurricane Dorian was on track to hit northern Florida. Then president Donald Trump incorrectly mentioned that Alabama would also be threatened by the storm and on Sept. 4, 2019 displayed an altered National Hurricane Center map. The acting Chief Scientist Craig McLean had the National Weather Service issue a correction via Twitter. The resulting aftermath between the administration and McLean ended in his removal from that position.

== Flag ==
The NOAA Chief Scientist is authorized to fly a personal flag as described in NAO 201-6 A: Official Flags of NOAA. It is a rectangular field of dark blue with three vertical red stars near the hoist. In the center is a white circle containing a red triangle with the NOAA "flying seagull" logo in it.

== List of NOAA Chief Scientists ==
No.	Image	Name	Term start	Term end	Notes
1		Sylvia Earle	1990	January 1992	
--		William Hooke	January 1992	August 1992	acting
--		Kathryn D. Sullivan	August 1992	May 1993	acting
2		Kathryn D. Sullivan	May 1993	May 1996	
From 1996 until 2014, there was no Chief Scientist at NOAA, even after its explicit reestablishment in 2009.
3		Richard W Spinrad	May 2014	December 2016	
--		Craig McLean	January 2017	September 2020	acting
--		Ryan Maue	September 2020	January 2021	acting
--		Craig McLean	April 2021	April 2022	acting
4		Sarah Kapnick	April 2022	August 2025	
--		Steven Thur	August 2025	incumbent	acting
