= Sarah Kapnick =

American scientist

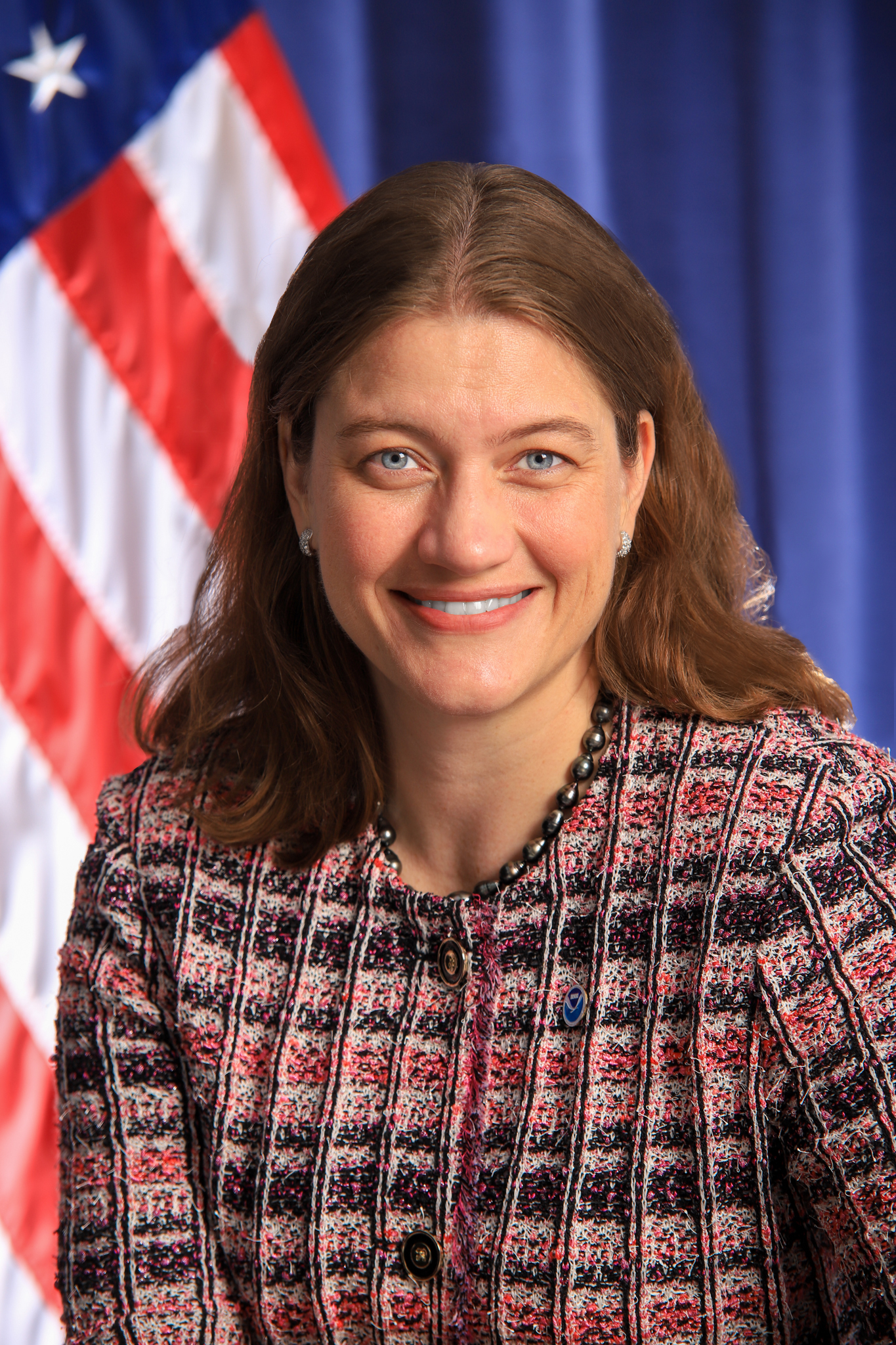

4th NOAA Chief Scientist
- In office April 2022 – October 2024
- Appointed by: President Joe Biden
- Preceding: Steven Thur
- Preceded by: Craig McLean

Personal details
- Born: May 1982 (age 44) Winnetka, Illinois
- Spouse: Andrew Christopher Elken
- Education: Ph.D. UCLA 2011; M.S. UCLA 2007; A.B. Princeton

Sarah Kapnick is an American scientist, political advisor, and financial executive.

She was appointed by President Biden to serve as the fourth chief scientist of NOAA from April 2022 to October 2024, and is presently the inaugural Global Head of Climate Advisory at JP Morgan Chase.

== Education ==
Kapnick has a Master's of Sciences (2007) in atmospheric sciences and a Ph.D. (2011) in atmospheric and oceanic sciences from the University of California, Los Angeles (UCLA) and an A.B. in mathematics and finance (2004) from Princeton University.

== Career ==
Kapnick was an investment banking analyst for Goldman Sachs starting in 2004 focusing on financial growth and climate change.

Kapnick's first job at the National Oceanic and Atmospheric Administration was in NOAA’s Geophysical Fluid Dynamics Laboratory (GFDL) as the deputy division leader for seasonal to decadal variability researching climate predictions, water security and climate impacts from 2011 to 2021. She then worked at JP Morgan Chase as their senior climate scientist and sustainability strategist from 2021 to 2022. In 2022, Kapnick was appointed the NOAA chief scientist by President Biden.

In 2024, JPMorgan Chase hired her as their Global Head of Climate Advisory.
