= Rick Spinrad =

American oceanographer and government official

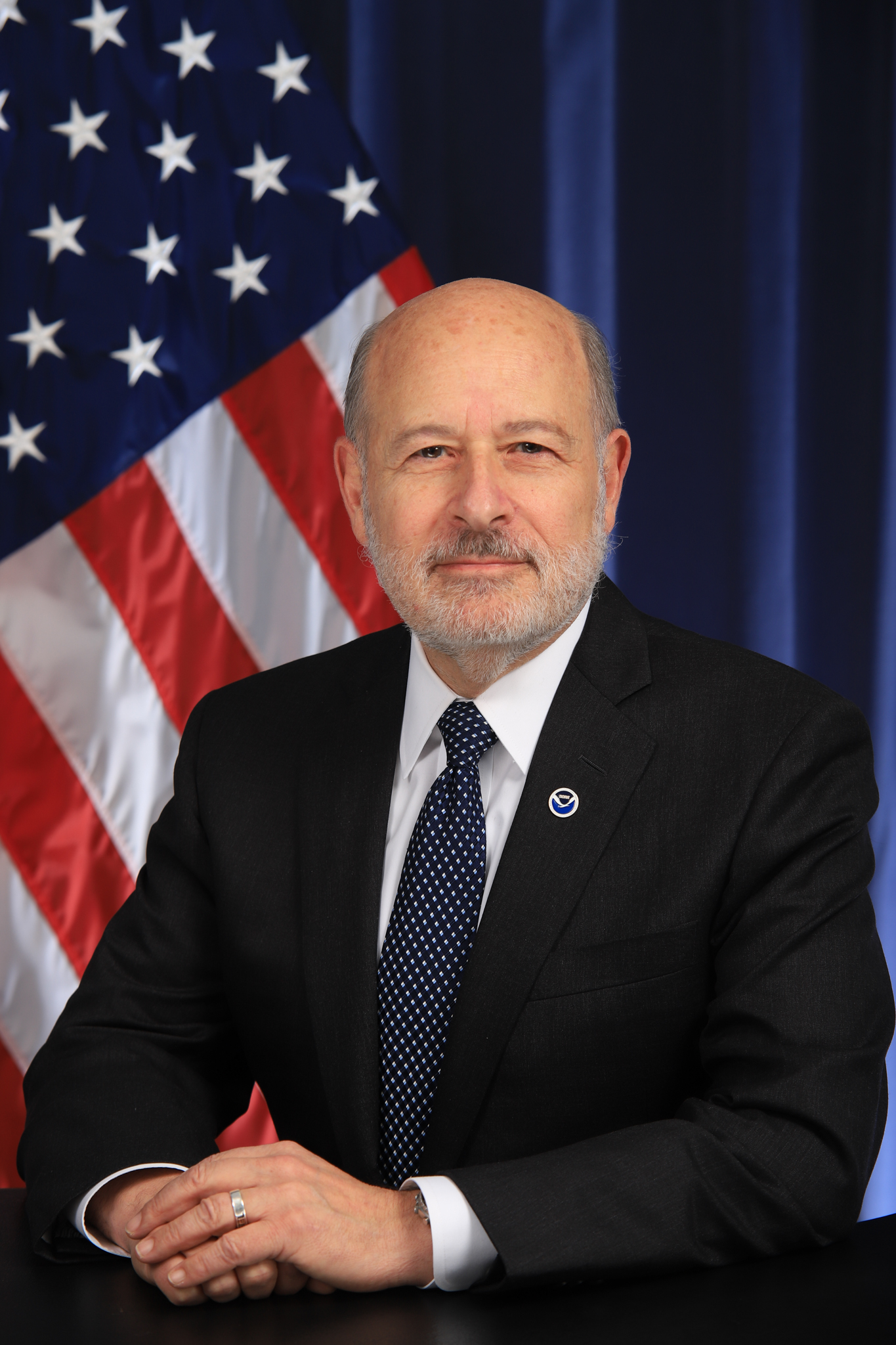
- Spinrad in 2022

11th Under Secretary of Commerce for Oceans and Atmosphere; 11th Administrator of the National Oceanic and Atmospheric Administration
- In office June 22, 2021 – January 20, 2025
- President: Joe Biden
- Preceded by: Kathy Sullivan (2017)
- Succeeded by: Neil Jacobs

Personal details
- Born: April 6, 1954 (age 72) New York, New York, U.S.
- Education: Johns Hopkins University (BS); Oregon State University (MS, PhD)
- Scientific career
- Fields: Oceanography
- Institutions: Office of Naval Research; Naval Meteorology and Oceanography Command; Office of Oceanic and Atmospheric Research; United States Naval Academy; George Mason University; Oregon State University; National Oceanic and Atmospheric Administration
- Thesis: Optical characteristics of the suspended sediment in the High Energy Benthic Boundary Layer Experiment (1982)
- Doctoral advisors: J. Ronald V. Zaneveld; Hans J. Schrader; LaVerne D. Kulm

Richard William Spinrad is an American oceanographer and government official who served as the 11th Administrator of the National Oceanic and Atmospheric Administration. He also concurrently served as Under Secretary of Commerce for Oceans and Atmosphere from 2021 until 2025.

== Early life and education ==
Born and raised in New York City, Spinrad earned a Bachelor of Arts degree in earth and planetary sciences in 1975 from Johns Hopkins University, and a Master of Science and a PhD in oceanography in 1978 and 1982, respectively, from Oregon State University at the Hatfield Marine Science Center.

== Career ==
Spinrad has held positions in the Office of Naval Research and Naval Meteorology and Oceanography Command; for this work, he was awarded the Navy Distinguished Civilian Service Award.

From 2003 to 2010, Spinrad was the head of the Office of Oceanic and Atmospheric Research within NOAA, and also was the U.S. permanent representative of the Intergovernmental Oceanographic Commission from 2005 to 2009. He was the Vice President for Research at Oregon State University from 2010 to 2014.

Spinrad was Chief Scientist of the National Oceanic and Atmospheric Administration from 2014 to 2016, after which he was a professor of oceanography at Oregon State University.

On Earth Day 2021, Spinrad was nominated by President Joe Biden to serve as the Under Secretary of Commerce for Oceans and Atmosphere, which includes serving as the administrator of the National Oceanic and Atmospheric Administration (NOAA) in the Department of Commerce. On June 17, 2021, his nomination was confirmed by voice vote in the United States Senate. He was sworn in by Secretary of Commerce Gina Raimondo on June 22, 2021. He served until the Biden administration left office on January 20, 2025.

In 2025, Spinrad was elected to the National Academy of Engineering.

Government offices
Preceded by Kathryn D. Sullivan	11th Administrator of the National Oceanic and Atmospheric Administration; 2021–2025	Succeeded by Neil Jacobs
