= Under Secretary of Commerce for Oceans and Atmosphere =

US government official

United States Under Secretary of Commerce for Oceans and Atmosphere
- Seal of the National Oceanic and Atmospheric Administration

- Flag of an under secretary of commerce

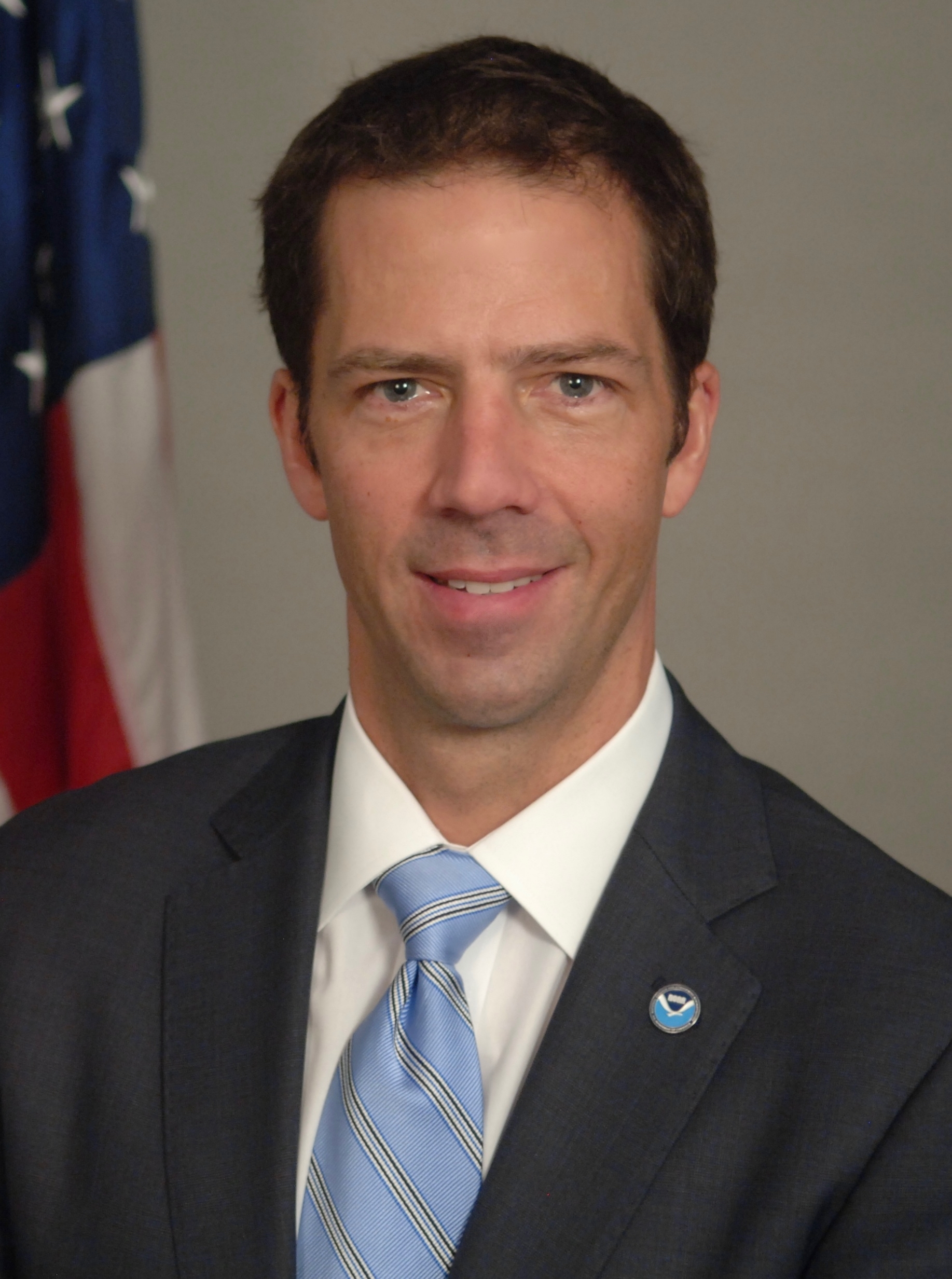
- Incumbent; Neil Jacobs since November 14, 2025
- Appointer: The president; with Senate advice and consent
- Formation: October 3, 1970
- First holder: Robert M. White
- Website: www.noaa.gov

The under secretary of commerce for oceans and atmosphere, or USC(OA), is a high-ranking official in the United States Department of Commerce and the principal advisor to the United States Secretary of Commerce on the environmental and scientific activities of the department. The under secretary is dual hatted as the administrator of the National Oceanic and Atmospheric Administration within the Commerce Department.

The under secretary is appointed by the president of the United States with the consent of the United States Senate to serve at the pleasure of the president.

In February 2025, President Trump nominated former acting Under Secretary of Commerce for Oceans and Atmosphere Neil Jacobs to the position. He was confirmed to the position on October 7.

== Overview ==
As the Administrator of the National Oceanic and Atmospheric Administration, the under secretary oversees the day-to-day functions of the National Oceanic and Atmospheric Administration, as well as laying out its strategic and operational future.

Components of the National Oceanic and Atmospheric Administration that the Administrator oversees include the National Environmental Satellite, Data and Information Service, National Marine Fisheries Service, National Ocean Service, National Weather Service, Oceanic and Atmospheric Research, Marine and Aviation Operations, and the NOAA Corps.

With the rank of under secretary, the USC(OA) is a Level III position within the Executive Schedule Since January 2023, the annual rate of pay for Level III is $195,000. The under secretary ranks fifth in the line of succession for the office of Secretary of Commerce.

== History ==
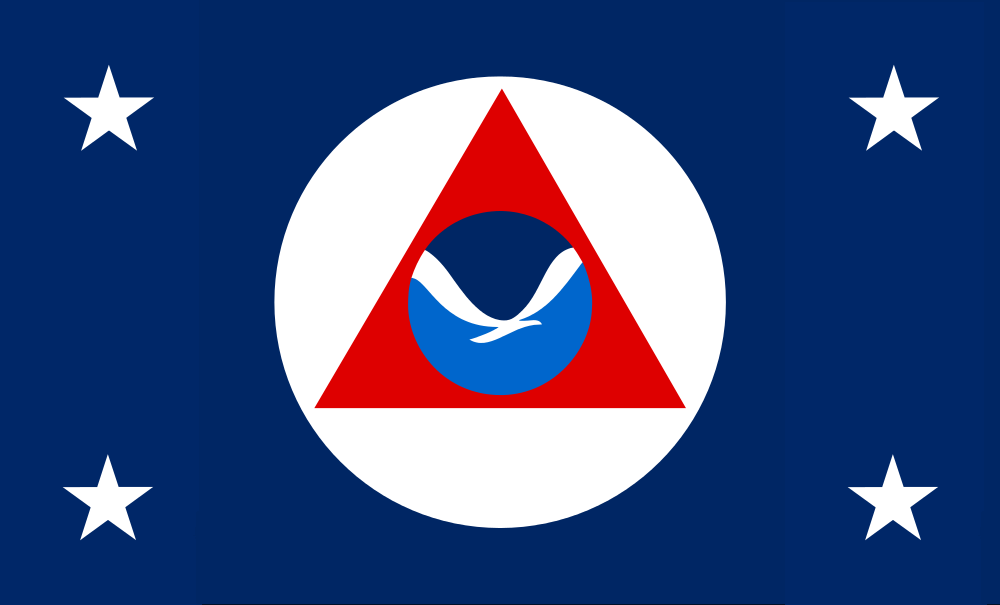
When occupying the role of Administrator of NOAA, the under secretary may also be entitled to use this flag.

The position of Under Secretary of Commerce for Oceans and Atmosphere was created by the National Oceanic and Atmospheric Administration Marine Fisheries Program Authorization Act of 1985. The position was created to serve as the Administrator of NOAA. It also created an Assistant Secretary of Commerce for Oceans and Atmosphere to serve as Deputy Administrator of NOAA. William Evans was the first person to have the title of Under Secretary of Commerce for Oceans and Atmosphere. The position of Administrator of the National Oceanic and Atmospheric Administration was created earlier by the Reorganization Plan No. 4 of 1970.

During the first Donald Trump administration, the agency never had a confirmed leader. Trump first nominated former AccuWeather CEO Barry Myers to serve as Under Secretary of Commerce for Oceans and Atmosphere on Oct 12, 2017. His nomination was returned to President Trump by the Senate on January 3, 2018, resubmitted on January 8, 2018, returned again on January 3, 2019, and resubmitted again on January 16, 2019. In November 2019, Myers withdrew his nomination, citing health concerns. A month later, Trump nominated Neil Jacobs, then the acting administrator, to be the 11th administrator. Though Jacobs had Senate confirmation hearings in May 2020, he was never confirmed, in part because of the so-called Sharpiegate incident.

== Reporting officials ==
Officials reporting to the USC(OA)/Administrator include:

- Assistant Secretary of Commerce for Conservation and Management/Deputy Administrator
- Assistant Secretary of Commerce for Environmental Observation and Prediction/Deputy Administrator
- NOAA Chief Scientist
- Principal Deputy Under Secretary of Commerce for Oceans and Atmosphere
- Deputy Under Secretary of Commerce for Operations
- Assistant Administrator, National Marine Fisheries Service
- Assistant Administrator, National Ocean Service
- Assistant Administrator, National Environmental Satellite, Data and Information Service
- Assistant Administrator, Oceanic and Atmospheric Research
- Assistant Administrator, National Weather Service
- Assistant Administrator, Program Planning and Integration

== Officeholders ==
From 1970 to 1988, the head of NOAA was the NOAA Administrator. Starting with Bill Evans in 1988, that person held the title of Under Secretary of Commerce for Oceans and Atmosphere.

Denotes an Acting Administrator of NOAA

No.	Portrait	Name	Took office	Left office	Ref	Tenure	President serving under
1	Robert M. White	Robert M. White	October 3, 1970	July 13, 1977		3 years, 310 days	Richard Nixon
1	Robert M. White	Robert M. White	October 3, 1970	July 13, 1977		2 years, 164 days	Gerald Ford
1	Robert M. White	Robert M. White	October 3, 1970	July 13, 1977		174 days (6 years, 283 days total)	Jimmy Carter
2	Richard A. Frank	Richard A. Frank	July 13, 1977	January 20, 1981		3 years, 191 days	Jimmy Carter
acting		James P. Walsh	January 20, 1981	June 10, 1981		141 days	Ronald Reagan
3	John V. Byrne	John V. Byrne	June 10, 1981	November 15, 1984		3 years, 158 days	Ronald Reagan
acting		Anthony J. Calio	November 15, 1984	October 4, 1985		323 days	Ronald Reagan
4		Anthony J. Calio	October 4, 1985	September 15, 1987		1 year, 346 days (2 years, 304 days total)	Ronald Reagan
acting		J. Curtis Mack II	September 15, 1987	March 31, 1988		198 days	Ronald Reagan
5	William Evans	William Eugene Evans	March 31, 1988	August 7, 1989		295 days	Ronald Reagan
5	William Evans	William Eugene Evans	March 31, 1988	August 7, 1989		199 days (1 year, 129 days total)	George H. W. Bush
6	John A. Knauss	John A. Knauss	August 7, 1989	February 26, 1993		3 years, 166 days	George H. W. Bush
6	John A. Knauss	John A. Knauss	August 7, 1989	February 26, 1993		37 days (3 years, 203 days total)	Bill Clinton
acting		Diana Josephson	February 26, 1993	May 28, 1993		91 days	Bill Clinton
7	Donald James Baker	D. James Baker	May 28, 1993	January 20, 2001		7 years, 237 days	Bill Clinton
acting	Scott Gudes	Scott Gudes	January 20, 2001	December 10, 2001		324 days	George W. Bush
8	VADMConrad C. Lautenbacher	Vice Admiral Conrad C. Lautenbacher	December 10, 2001	October 31, 2008		6 years, 326 days	George W. Bush
acting	William J. Brennan	William J. Brennan	November 1, 2008	March 19, 2009		81 days	George W. Bush
acting	William J. Brennan	William J. Brennan	November 1, 2008	March 19, 2009		58 days (139 days total)	Barack Obama
9	Jane Lubchenco	Jane Lubchenco	March 20, 2009	February 28, 2013		3 years, 345 days	Barack Obama
acting	Kathryn D. Sullivan	Kathryn D. Sullivan	March 1, 2013	March 6, 2014		1 year, 5 days	Barack Obama
10	Kathryn D. Sullivan	Kathryn D. Sullivan	March 6, 2014	January 20, 2017		2 years, 320 days (3 years, 325 days total)	Barack Obama
acting	Vice Admiral Manson K. Brown	Vice Admiral; Manson K. Brown (Note: Brown served as Acting Under Secretary of Commerce for Oceans and Atmosphere and Acting Administrator of the National Oceanic and Atmospheric Administration (NOAA) in his capacity as Assistant Secretary of Commerce for Environmental Observation and Prediction and Deputy Administrator of the National Oceanic and Atmospheric Administration (NOAA) for approximately two hours on January 20, 2017 from the time of the formal resignation of Kathryn D. Sullivan as Under Secretary of Commerce for Oceans and Atmosphere and Administrator of the National Oceanic and Atmospheric Administration (NOAA) at noon on January 20, 2017 until the time of the formal appointment of Deputy Under Secretary of Commerce for Operations (DUSO) of the National Oceanic and Atmospheric Administration (NOAA) Benjamin Friedman as Acting Under Secretary of Commerce for Oceans and Atmosphere and Acting Administrator of the National Oceanic and Atmospheric Administration (NOAA) in the early afternoon on January 20, 2017 pursuant to United States Department of Commerce Department Organization Order (DOO) 10-15 and the Federal Vacancies Reform Act of 1998.)	January 20, 2017	January 20, 2017		0 days	Donald Trump
acting	Benjamin Friedman	Benjamin Friedman	January 20, 2017	October 25, 2017		278 days	Donald Trump
acting	RDML Timothy Gallaudet	Timothy Gallaudet	October 25, 2017	February 25, 2019		1 year, 123 days	Donald Trump
acting	Neil Jacobs	Neil Jacobs	February 25, 2019	January 20, 2021		1 year, 330 days	Donald Trump
acting	Stephen M. Volz	Stephen M. Volz (Note: Volz served as Acting Under Secretary of Commerce for Oceans and Atmosphere and Acting Administrator of the National Oceanic and Atmospheric Administration (NOAA) in his capacity as Assistant Administrator for the National Environmental Satellite, Data, and Information Service (NESDIS) of the National Oceanic and Atmospheric Administration (NOAA) for approximately two hours on January 20, 2021 from the time of the formal resignation of Neil Jacobs as Acting Under Secretary of Commerce for Oceans and Atmosphere and Acting Administrator of the National Oceanic and Atmospheric Administration (NOAA) at noon on January 20, 2021 until the time of the formal appointment of Deputy Under Secretary of Commerce for Operations (DUSO) of the National Oceanic and Atmospheric Administration (NOAA) Benjamin Friedman as Acting Under Secretary of Commerce for Oceans and Atmosphere and Acting Administrator of the National Oceanic and Atmospheric Administration (NOAA) in the early afternoon on January 20, 2021 pursuant to United States Department of Commerce Department Organization Order (DOO) 10-15 and the Federal Vacancies Reform Act of 1998.)	January 20, 2021	January 20, 2021		0 days	Joe Biden
acting	Benjamin Friedman	Benjamin Friedman	January 20, 2021	June 22, 2021		153 days	Joe Biden
11	Rick Spinrad	Rick Spinrad	June 22, 2021	January 20, 2025		3 years, 211 days	Joe Biden
acting	Michael C. Morgan	Michael C. Morgan (Note: Morgan served as Acting Under Secretary of Commerce for Oceans and Atmosphere and Acting Administrator of the National Oceanic and Atmospheric Administration (NOAA) in his capacity as Assistant Secretary of Commerce for Environmental Observation and Prediction and Deputy Administrator of the National Oceanic and Atmospheric Administration (NOAA) for approximately two hours on January 20, 2025 from the time of the formal resignation of Rick Spinrad as Under Secretary of Commerce for Oceans and Atmosphere and Administrator of the National Oceanic and Atmospheric Administration (NOAA) at noon on January 20, 2025 until the time of the formal appointment of Deputy Under Secretary of Commerce for Operations (DUSO) of the National Oceanic and Atmospheric Administration (NOAA) Vice Admiral Nancy Hann as Acting Under Secretary of Commerce for Oceans and Atmosphere and Acting Administrator of the National Oceanic and Atmospheric Administration (NOAA) in the early afternoon on January 20, 2025 pursuant to United States Department of Commerce Department Organization Order (DOO) 10-15 and the Federal Vacancies Reform Act of 1998.)	January 20, 2025	January 20, 2025		0 days	Donald Trump
acting	Vice Admiral Nancy Hann	Vice Admiral; Nancy Hann	January 20, 2025	March 31, 2025		70 days	Donald Trump
acting	Laura Grimm	Laura Grimm	March 31, 2025	November 14, 2025		228 days	Donald Trump
12	Neil Jacobs	Neil Jacobs	November 14, 2025	Present		1 year, 2 days	Donald Trump
