= Peter Davison (composer) =

American composer (born 1948)

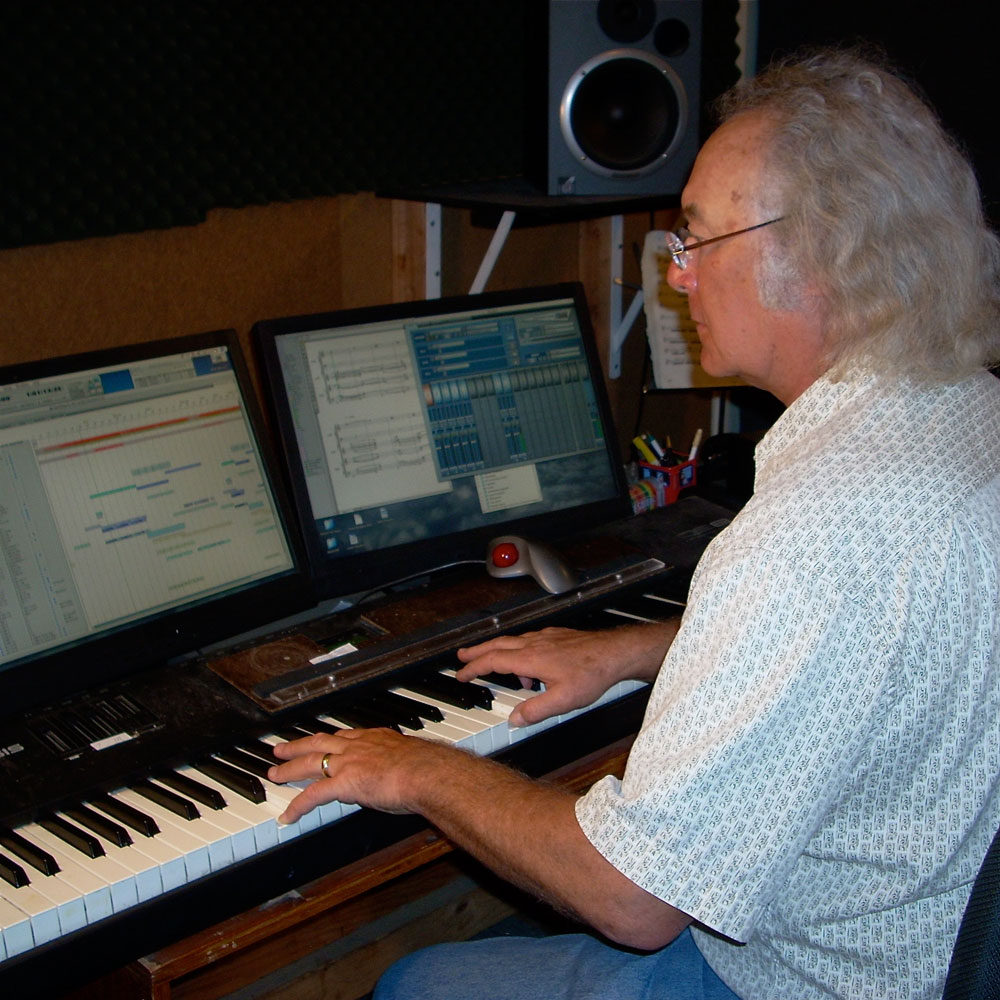

Background information
- Born: 1948 (age 77–78)
- Genres: New-age
- Occupations: Composer - CDs and TV/Film scoring
- Years active: 1974–present
- Website: peterdavison.com

Peter Davison (born 1948) is an American composer known for New Age/Neo Classical works, and television and film scores.

== Early years ==
Davison was born in Los Angeles, California. He played flute, saxophone, guitar, keyboards and electric bass in all sorts of ensembles throughout his public school years. He received his Bachelor's and master's degrees in Music Composition from California State University, Northridge.

== Career ==
Davison has composed music scores for Indie Features, the History Channel, A+E, Biography, PBS, Warner Bros., Disney, Universal, Discovery, Gaiam (Yoga/Relaxation music). Over 40 CDs of his music are on Higher Octave/Universal, Gaiam, Davisounds and TSR/Baja. His CDs Meditate and Exhale were both in the Billboard Top 10 New Age Albums. His music is widely played in internet radio. On Pandora at this time there are 90 million streams of his music with similar stats on the other internet music providers such as Spotify. He has received awards and nominations from the Global Music Awards, Hollywood Music in Media Awards, Accolade Global Film Awards, Colortape International Film Festival and others. Davison's first 7 releases (1980-1986) are considered pioneers of New Age Music. Fact of Being, a European label has re-released the first 2 of these on vinyl LP. They will re-release the remaining 5 over the next 2 years, as a retrospective of Davison's early work. Davison has also received commissions for classical orchestral music. GQ, Gentleman's Quarterly, published a feature article about Davison in their June, 2023 issue.

== Discography ==
Davisounds Label 2008–present	GAIAM Label CDs 1986 - 2002	Higher Octave/Universal Label 1980 - 1986
Windows in the Sky		
Clearing Darkness		
Sincerely Yours, Peter Davison		
Think About What You Are Thinking About		
The Attainable Gifts of Imagination		
The Continuing Odyssey		
Winds of Time		
The Unfolding Self		
On Shores of Crystal Dreams		
Wanderings	Yoga	Winds of Space
Rest and Be Thankful	Comfort	Glide
Poems Without Words	Solace	Star Gazer
Plateau	Presence	Forest
GAIA - Music for Our Mother Earth	Exhale	Mountain
The Colors of Sound	T'ai Chi	Traces
On the Edge of Now	Meditate	Music on the Way
When I Go Inside	AM & PM Yoga	
My Universe in Harmony	Rejuvenate	
Iris - Bringer of Dreams	Vitality	
Clarity Rising		TSR/Baja Label, 1996
Enchanted Lagoon		Focal Point
What Happened Next		
NOW...the Present is a Gift	GAIAM Label DVDs 1986 - 2002	
Moments of Transformation	AM & PM Yoga	
Floating in Bliss	Yoga for Beginners	
The Pleiades	Rodney Yee DVDs, multiple	
Music from the Heart of the Forest	Power Yoga DVDs, multiple	
Galileo's Telescope	Qigong DVDs, multiple	
Getting Closer	T'ai Chi DVDs, multiple	
Forest Home		
Future, Present, Past		
Possibility		
Release		
Take Me Back to Eden		

== Television and film scores ==
History Channel:	PBS Series:	Warner Brothers:
Escape: True Tales of Suspense	Earth Revealed (26 episodes)	Batman, The Animated Series
Breakout from Iran	Our Families, Ourselves (18 Episodes)	The Flash
Escape from Kuwait	Inside Out (22 Episodes)	Show Time:
Chain Gang Breakout	The Way We Live (22 Episodes)	Shelley Duvall's Faerie Tale Theatre:
Fire in Mann Gulch	The Unfinished Nation (52 Episodes)	Snow White and the Seven Dwarfs
Papillon	The Endless Voyage (26 Episodes)	Universal Studios:
Escape from Bosnia, the Scott O'Grady Story	Madison Heights (16 Episodes)	SeaQuest DSV
Bravo, Biography, A+E, AMC:	Framework for Democracy (26 Episodes)	Islands of Adventure,
Mary Magdelene	The Examined Life (26 episodes)	Theme Park in Orlando, Florida
Diplomats for the Damned	Crossroads Cafe (26 episodes)	Cinco Rosas Productions:
Crimes in Time	On Common Ground (15 episodes)	The Last Word
The Hollywood Soundtrack Story	Something Ventured (26 episodes)	Harmony Gold:
Smothered, Bio of the Smothers Brothers	Sales Connection (26 episodes)	Secret of the Lens
Bella Lewitzky, feature documentary, BAM Entertainment	The Human Condition (26 episodes)	Media FX Media:
	Life Lines (16 Episodes)	The Stewards of Shaver's Fork
		Legacy Interactive Media:
		Emergency Room (Video Game)
