= Elizabeth Erin Walsh =

American government official

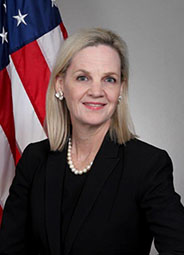

Director General of the United States Commercial Service
- In office August 17, 2017 – May 3, 2018
- President: Donald Trump

Assistant Secretary of Commerce (Global Markets)
- In office August 17, 2017 – May 3, 2018
- President: Donald Trump

Personal details
- Education: Georgetown University; London School of Economics

Elizabeth Erin Walsh is an American government official who, until May 3, 2018, served as Assistant Secretary of Commerce and Director General of the United States Commercial Service. Prior to assuming this role, she was special assistant to the U.S. President and associate director for presidential personnel. During the first presidential transition of Donald Trump, Walsh was part of the landing team for the United States Department of State, helping to fill vacancies at that department and at the United States Agency for International Development.

Walsh has held posts at the United States Department of State, the United States Mission to the United Nations, and the United States Department of Energy. She worked for the United Nations in Bosnia during the Bosnian War. In the private sector, Walsh worked for Cisco Systems and Goldman Sachs. In 2018, Walsh joined the U.S. National Security Council, directing the agency's sections for international organizations and alliances and for Africa.
