= Peter B. Davidson =

American lawyer

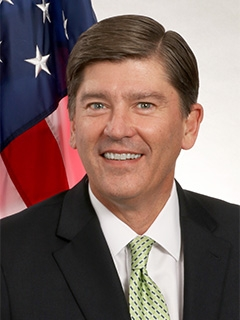

General Counsel of the United States Department of Commerce
- In office August 2017 – 2019
- President: Donald Trump
- Preceded by: Kelly R. Welsh
- Succeeded by: Leslie B. Kiernan

Personal details
- Spouse: Kari
- Children: 3
- Education: Carleton College; University of Virginia School of Law

Peter B. Davidson is an American lawyer and government official who served as the General Counsel of the United States Department of Commerce from 2017 to 2019. From 2003 to 2017, he was the senior vice president for federal government relations at Verizon Communications. Before that he held positions as general counsel to the United States Trade Representative, vice president for congressional relations at US West and Qwest, general counsel and policy director to the Majority Leader of the House of Representatives, attorney-advisor in the Office of Legal Counsel of the United States Department of Justice, director of congressional and media relations at the United States Information Agency, staffer to Representatives Dick Armey and Bill Frenzel, and law clerk on the United States Court of Appeals for the Tenth Circuit.

As General Counsel of the Department of Commerce, Davison was involved in the effort to add a citizenship question to the 2020 census, which the Supreme Court halted on the grounds that the reasons the Department gave for doing so were "contrived."

Following his resignation from the Department of Commerce, Davidson worked as a deputy dean at Antonin Scalia Law School and as Vice President of Global Government Affairs and Policy at Intelsat.

== Personal life ==
With his wife, Kari, he has three children: Madeleine, Sophie, and Björn.
