= Neil Jacobs =

American scientist and government official (born 1973)

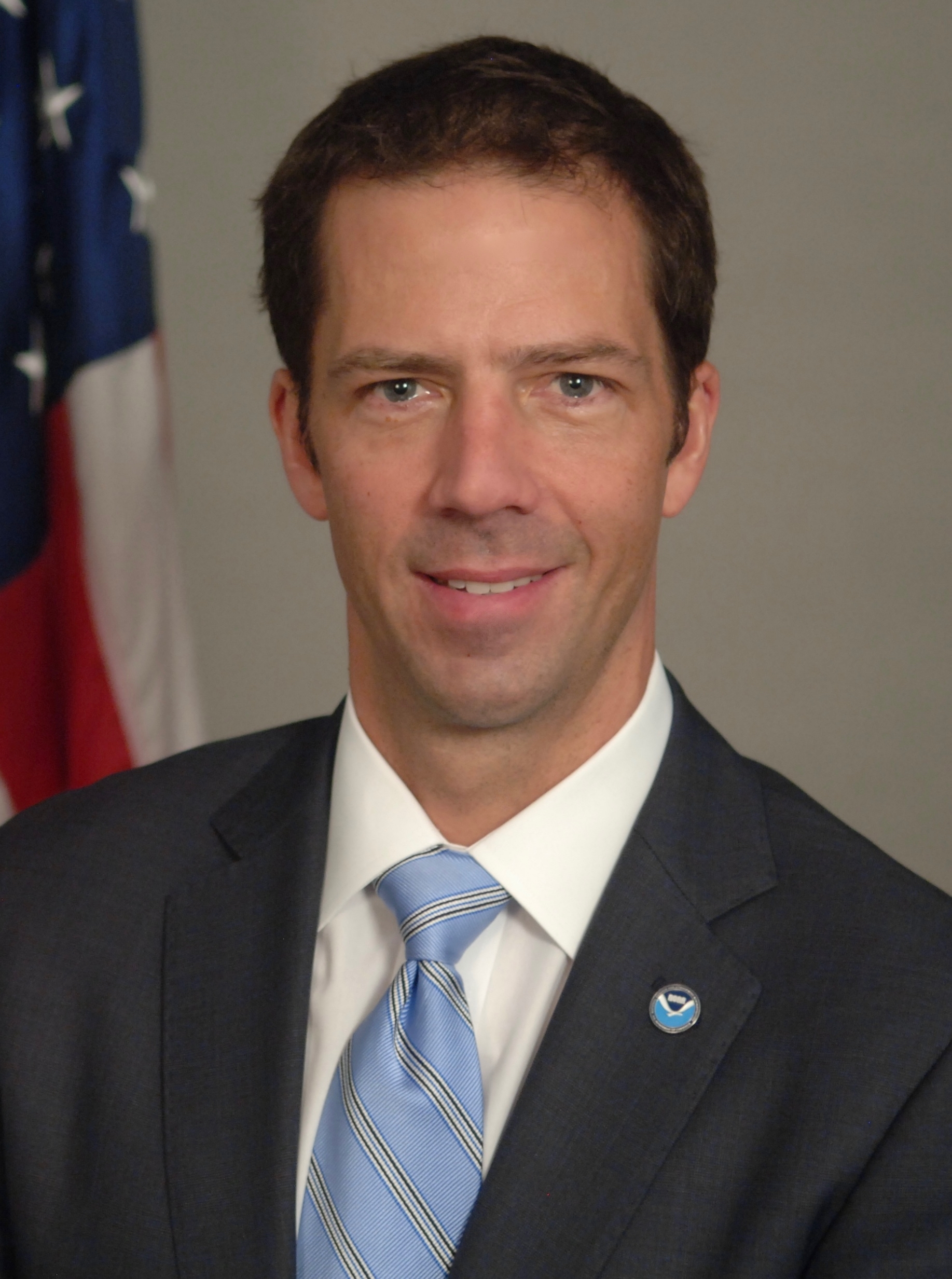

12th Under Secretary of Commerce for Oceans and Atmosphere (Note: Concurrently, the ex-officio Administrator of the National Oceanic and Atmospheric Administration)
- Incumbent
- Assumed office November 14, 2025
- President: Donald Trump
- Preceded by: Rick Spinrad
- Acting
- In office February 25, 2019 – January 20, 2021
- President: Donald Trump
- Preceded by: Timothy Gallaudet
- Succeeded by: Benjamin Friedman (acting)

Assistant Secretary of Commerce for Environmental Observation and Prediction Deputy Administrator of the National Oceanic and Atmospheric Administration
- In office February 15, 2018 – January 20, 2021
- President: Donald Trump
- Preceded by: Stephen Volz

Personal details
- Born: December 12, 1973 (age 52) Colorado Springs, Colorado, U.S.
- Children: 2
- Education: University of South Carolina (BS, BS); North Carolina State University (MS, PhD)
- Scientific career
- Fields: Atmospheric science
- Workplaces: AirDat LLC; Panasonic Avionics Corporation
- Thesis: The role of marine thermal gradient structure on Gulf Stream-related extratropical cyclogenesis (2005)
- Doctoral advisors: Sethu Raman; Gary Lackmann
- Other academic advisors: Leonard J. Pietrafesa

Neil Andrew Jacobs, Jr. (born December 12, 1973) is an American scientist and the current Under Secretary of Commerce for Oceans and Atmosphere and Administrator of the National Oceanic and Atmospheric Administration (NOAA). He had previously served as the acting NOAA administrator in the first Trump Administration.

== Early life and education ==
Jacobs was born in Colorado Springs, Colorado. He earned two Bachelor of Science degrees, in mathematics and physics, from the University of South Carolina in 1997, followed by a Master of Science and PhD in atmospheric science from North Carolina State University.

== Career ==
=== Industry ===
After completing his doctoral degree in 2005, Jacobs went to work with North Carolina–based AirDat LLC to work on the development of their TAMDAR (Tropospheric Airborne Meteorological Data Reporting) weather monitoring system as their director of research and business development. He stayed on with the company when the company was acquired by Panasonic Avionics Corporation in 2013. At Panasonic, he served as chief atmospheric scientist from 2013 until he was asked by President Trump to join the government in 2018.

During his time at AiRDat and Panasonic, Jacobs also worked on a small team of atmospheric scientists at World Meteorological Organization and served as chair of the American Meteorological Society's Forecast Improvement Group.

=== Government tenure during first Trump administration ===
In 2017, Jacobs was nominated to serve as Assistant Secretary of Commerce for Environmental Observation and Prediction and was confirmed on February 15, 2018. When Timothy Gallaudet, the acting NOAA Administrator asked to be allowed to focus on his Senate-confirmed position as Assistant Secretary of Commerce for Oceans and Atmosphere in February 2018, Jacobs became the Acting NOAA Administrator and late the next year he was nominated to take on the role permanently when Barry Myers withdrew from consideration for health reasons. After not being confirmed in 2019, he was re-nominated in 2020. A hearing on his nomination was held in March 2020 and his nomination was approved by the Senate Commerce Committee in May of that year. On January 3, 2021, his nomination was returned to the President under Rule XXXI, Paragraph 6 of the United States Senate.

=== Role in Sharpiegate ===
In September 2019, President Donald Trump falsely claimed that Hurricane Dorian would make landfall over Alabama. After receiving several inquiries from residents, NOAA released a statement that Dorian would not reach Alabama. In an Oval Office briefing with reporters, Trump displayed a map including the altered projection that Dorian would make landfall in Alabama. On September 6, NOAA released a statement in support of Trump's inaccurate claim, including Alabama in the list of states that Dorian was expected to reach. Eventually, the path of Hurricane Dorian did not actually affect Alabama at all. In June 2020, an internal investigation found that Jacobs had violated NOAA's code of ethics by issuing a statement in support of Trump's false claim.

=== Unified Forecast System ===
In early 2022, Jacobs was chosen to serve as chief science advisor for the Unified Forecast System (UFS).

=== Second Trump administration ===
On February 4, 2025, newly-inaugurated President Donald Trump nominated Jacobs to the position of NOAA Administrator. Jacobs has committed to restaffing the Weather Service offices if committed and that the mission-critical work would continue despite future budget cuts. He was confirmed on October 7, 2025.

== Personal life ==
Jacobs lives in Durham, North Carolina, with his wife and two children. Jacobs is an avid surfer in the Outer Banks region.

== Notes ==
Government offices
Preceded by Rick Spinrad	12th Administrator of the National Oceanic and Atmospheric Administration; 2025–present	Incumbent
