= Kathryn D. Sullivan =

American astronaut (born 1951)

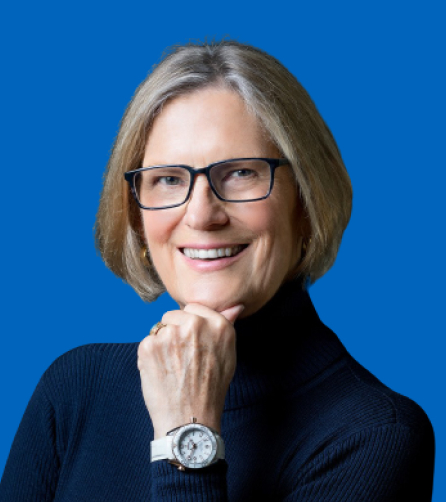
- Sullivan in 2021
- Born: Kathryn Dwyer Sullivan; October 3, 1951 (age 75); Paterson, New Jersey, U.S.
- Education: University of California, Santa Cruz (BS); Dalhousie University (MS, PhD)
- Awards: NASA Outstanding Leadership Medal; NASA Exceptional Service Medal (2); NASA Space Flight Medal (3)
- Space career

NASA astronaut
- Rank: Captain, USN
- Time in space: 22d 4h 49m
- Selection: NASA Group 8 (1978)
- Total EVAs: 1
- Total EVA time: 3h 29m
- Mission: STS-41-G; STS-31; STS-45

10th Under Secretary of Commerce for Oceans and Atmosphere; 10th Administrator of the National Oceanic and Atmospheric Administration
- In office March 1, 2013 – January 20, 2017; Acting: March 1, 2013 – March 6, 2014
- President: Barack Obama
- Preceded by: Jane Lubchenco
- Succeeded by: Rick Spinrad
- Scientific career
- Fields: Geology; Oceanography
- Workplaces: NASA; Rice University; COSI Columbus; Ohio State University; NOAA
- Thesis: The Structure and Evolution of the Newfoundland Basin, Offshore Eastern Canada (1978)
- Doctoral advisor: Michael John Keen

Kathryn Dwyer Sullivan (born October 3, 1951) is an American geologist, oceanographer, and former NASA astronaut and US Navy officer. She was a crew member on three Space Shuttle missions.

A graduate of University of California, Santa Cruz, in the United States, and Dalhousie University in Nova Scotia, Canada—where she earned a Doctor of Philosophy degree in geology in 1978—Sullivan was selected as one of the six women among the 35 astronaut candidate in NASA Astronaut Group 8, the first group to include women. During her training, she became the first woman to be certified to wear a United States Air Force pressure suit, and on July 1, 1979, she set an unofficial sustained American aviation altitude record for women. During her first mission, STS-41-G, Sullivan performed the first extra-vehicular activity (EVA) by an American woman. On her second, STS-31, she helped deploy the Hubble Space Telescope. On the third, STS-45, she served as Payload Commander on the first Spacelab mission dedicated to NASA's Mission to Planet Earth.

Sullivan was Under Secretary of Commerce for Oceans and Atmosphere and Administrator of the National Oceanic and Atmospheric Administration (NOAA) after being confirmed by the US Senate on March 6, 2014. Her tenure ended on January 20, 2017, after which she was designated as the 2017 Charles A. Lindbergh Chair of Aerospace History at the Smithsonian Institution's National Air and Space Museum, and also served as a Senior Fellow at the Potomac Institute for Policy Studies. On June 7, 2020, Sullivan became the first woman to dive into the Challenger Deep in the Mariana Trench, the deepest part of Earth's oceans. In September 2021, President Joe Biden appointed her to the President's Council of Advisors on Science and Technology.

== Early life and education ==
Kathryn Dwyer Sullivan was born in Paterson, New Jersey, on October 3, 1951, the daughter of Donald Paul Sullivan and his wife Barbara, née Kelly. She has a brother, Grant. In 1958 the family moved to the San Fernando Valley in California, where her father worked in the aerospace industry for Marquardt Corporation. She was in the first grade at Havenhurst Elementary School, where Sally Ride was a classmate, but the school closed in 1958 to make way for Van Nuys Airport, and neither woman could recall meeting the other. During her school years she was a girl scout.

Sullivan graduated from William Howard Taft High School in the Woodland Hills district of Los Angeles, California, in 1969. She took both French and German in high school, and resolved to have a career in the foreign service. She chose to enter the University of California, Santa Cruz (UCSC), on account of its renowned Russian studies program. The university required that humanities students take three science classes and vice versa. She chose to take courses in marine biology, topology and oceanography. She enjoyed these, and altered her course to take in more science subjects. She was an exchange student at the University of Bergen in Norway for the 1971–1972 school year and the two summers around it, and decided to change her major to oceanography. She was awarded a Bachelor of Science degree in Earth Sciences from UCSC in 1973, and a Doctor of Philosophy in geology from Dalhousie University and the Bedford Institute of Oceanography in Nova Scotia, Canada, in 1978, writing her doctoral thesis on The structure and evolution of the Newfoundland Basin under the supervision of Michael John Keen. While at Dalhousie, she participated in several oceanographic expeditions that studied the floors of the Atlantic and Pacific oceans.

Kathryn D. Sullivan in 1981

== NASA career ==
=== Selection and training ===
When Sullivan visited her family for Christmas in 1976, her brother Grant, an aerospace engineer and corporate jet pilot, told her that the National Aeronautics and Space Administration (NASA) had issued a call for applications for a new group of astronauts. NASA had made it known that it was interested in recruiting women, and Grant encouraged her to apply. He had applied for both pilot and mission specialist positions. After she returned to Nova Scotia she saw a NASA ad in a science journal, and decided to apply. She reasoned that the Space Shuttle was a kind of research vessel, but her dream was still to descend to the ocean floor in a submersible. That prospect came closer when she received an offer from William B. F. Ryan from the Lamont–Doherty Earth Observatory at Columbia University to join his team exploring the ocean in the submersible DSV Alvin. Ryan had been an unsuccessful finalist for NASA Astronaut Group 6 in 1967, and he counseled her to wait for NASA to call. They both felt that the odds on being accepted were long, but Sullivan did not join Ryan's team while she waited to hear about her selection.

Grant's application was unsuccessful, but Kathryn was invited to come to the Johnson Space Center (JSC) for a week of interviews and physical examinations commencing on November 14, 1977. She was the only woman in this group of twenty-five finalists. Over the course of a week she was given physical and psychological examinations, and was interviewed by a selection panel chaired by George Abbey. She was successful, and her selection as one of the six women among the 35 members of NASA Astronaut Group 8 was publicly announced on January 16, 1978. It was the first astronaut group to include women. Sullivan was one of the three members of the group (the others being Sally Ride and Steve Hawley) for whom NASA astronaut would be their first full-time paid job since leaving university.

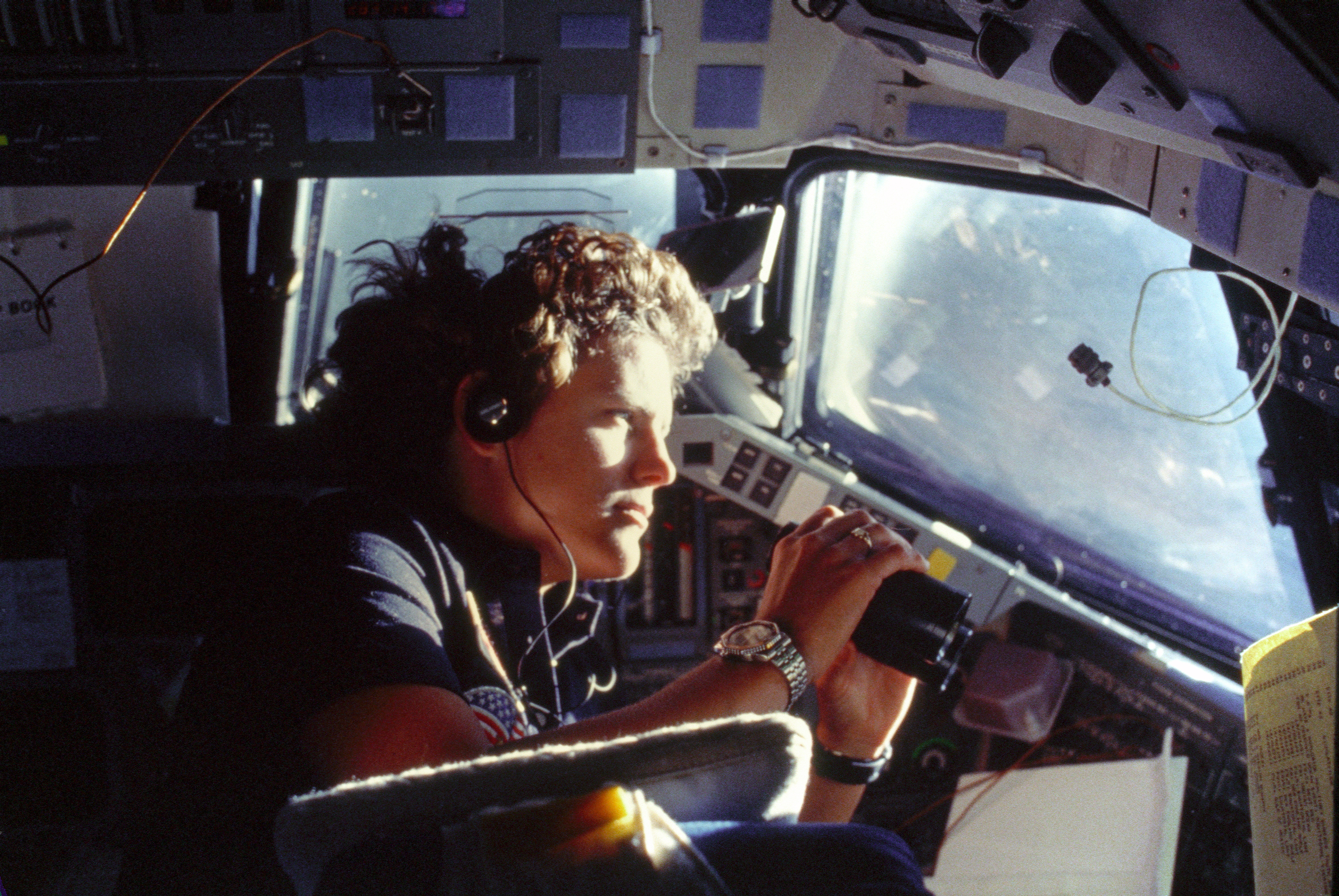
Using binoculars to view Earth during STS-41-G

On August 31, 1979, NASA announced that the 35 astronaut candidates had completed their training and evaluation, and were now officially astronauts, qualified for selection on space flight crews. To mark the occasion the Chief of the Astronaut Office, John Young, presented each of them with a silver NASA astronaut pin; they would become eligible for a gold one after they had flown in space. Like other astronaut groups before them, each was given a particular assignment. Sullivan helped develop systems management checklists for the first Space Shuttle flights. To give the newcomers more experience, they were periodically rotated to different jobs, so after nine months she became a mission manager at NASA's High Altitude Research Project, based at nearby Ellington Air Force Base. She became the first woman to be certified to wear a United States Air Force pressure suit, and on July 1, 1979, she set an unofficial sustained American aviation altitude record for women of 19,000 metres (63,000 ft) during a four-hour flight in a NASA WB-57F reconnaissance aircraft.

For the first Space Shuttle mission, STS-1, Sullivan was assigned to media support, working with Vic Ratner and Bob Walker on ABC News Radio. For the STS-2 mission she flew in the back seat of a NASA Northrop T-38 Talon chase plane piloted by fellow astronaut Hoot Gibson, photographing the Space Shuttle tiles to verify that none had been damaged. She was then assigned to the support crew at the Kennedy Space Center (KSC), along with fellow astronauts Steve Hawley, Loren Shriver and Don Williams, for the next four Space Shuttle missions.

=== STS-41-G ===
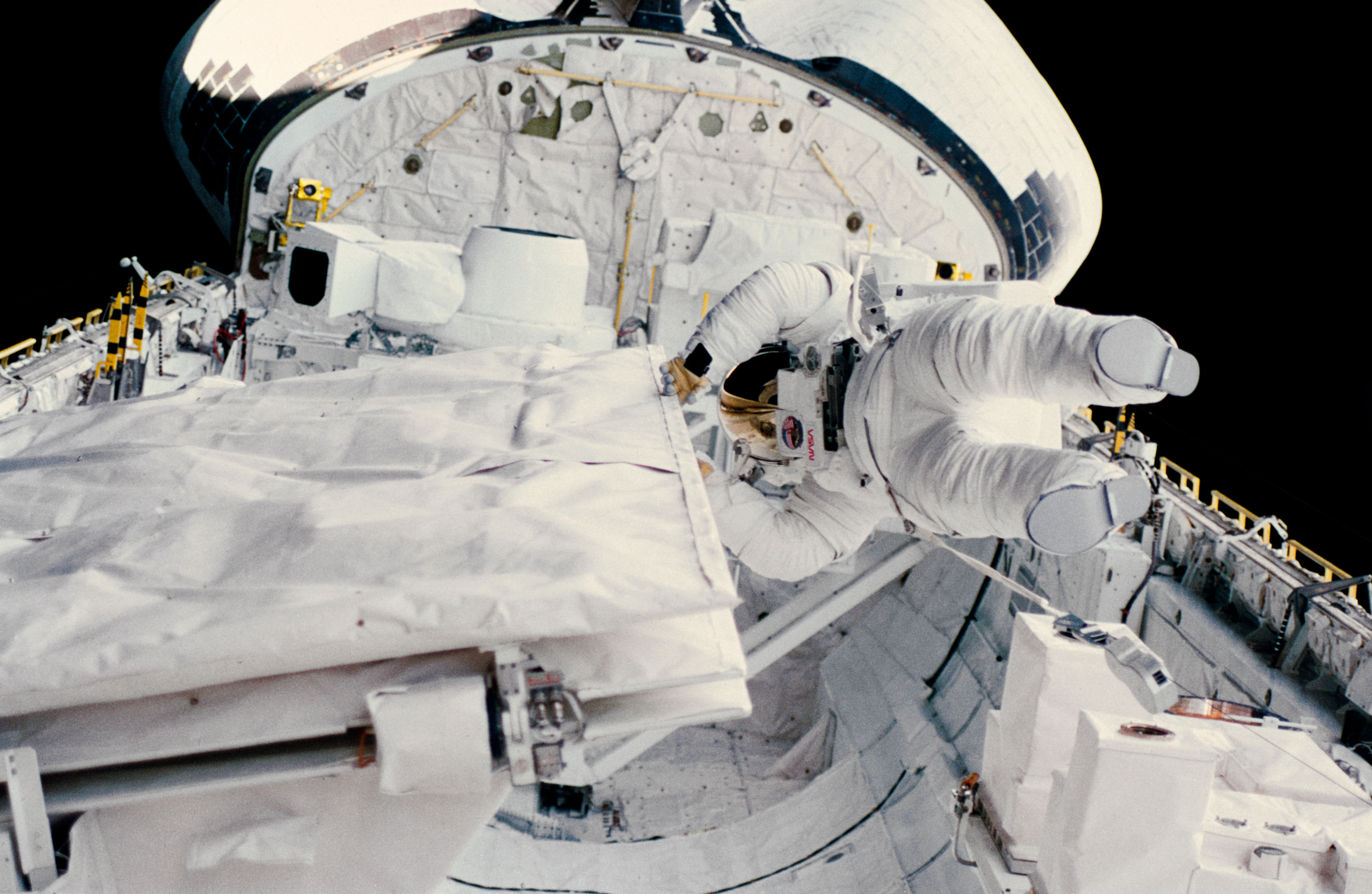
Checking the SIR-B antenna during STS-41-G

In July 1983 Sullivan joined the Mission Development group, which organised and supervised the development of payloads for future missions that did not yet have a crew assigned to them. She was assigned to the Office of Space and Terrestrial Applications' OSTA-3 satellite and the Orbital Refueling System (ORS). The objective of the latter was to demonstrate that the Space Shuttle could be used to refuel a satellite in orbit, thereby extending its useful life. For this the aging Landsat 4 satellite was chosen. In September 1983 she was officially assigned to this mission, which was designated STS-41-G.

Sally Ride was also assigned to this mission, so it became the first time that two women were in space together. The mission lifted off from the KSC in the Space Shuttle Challenger on October 5, 1984. Sullivan performed the first extra-vehicular activity (EVA) by an American woman on October 11, 1984. With fellow mission specialist David Leestma, she performed a 3.5-hour spacewalk in which they operated the ORS to show that a satellite could be refueled in orbit. They installed a valve into a satellite propulsion system that mimicked that of Landsat 4 and transferred 59 kilograms (130 lb) of hydrazine to it using the ORS. This demonstrated that the procedure could be performed with a real satellite.

During the eight-day mission, the crew also deployed the Earth Radiation Budget Satellite, conducted scientific observations of Earth with the OSTA-3 pallet (including the SIR-B radar, FILE, and MAPS experiments) and large format camera (LFC), and conducted several in-cabin experiments as well as activating eight "Getaway Special" canisters. STS-41G completed 132 orbits of Earth in 197.5 hours, before landing back at the KSC on October 13, 1984.

=== STS-61-J ===
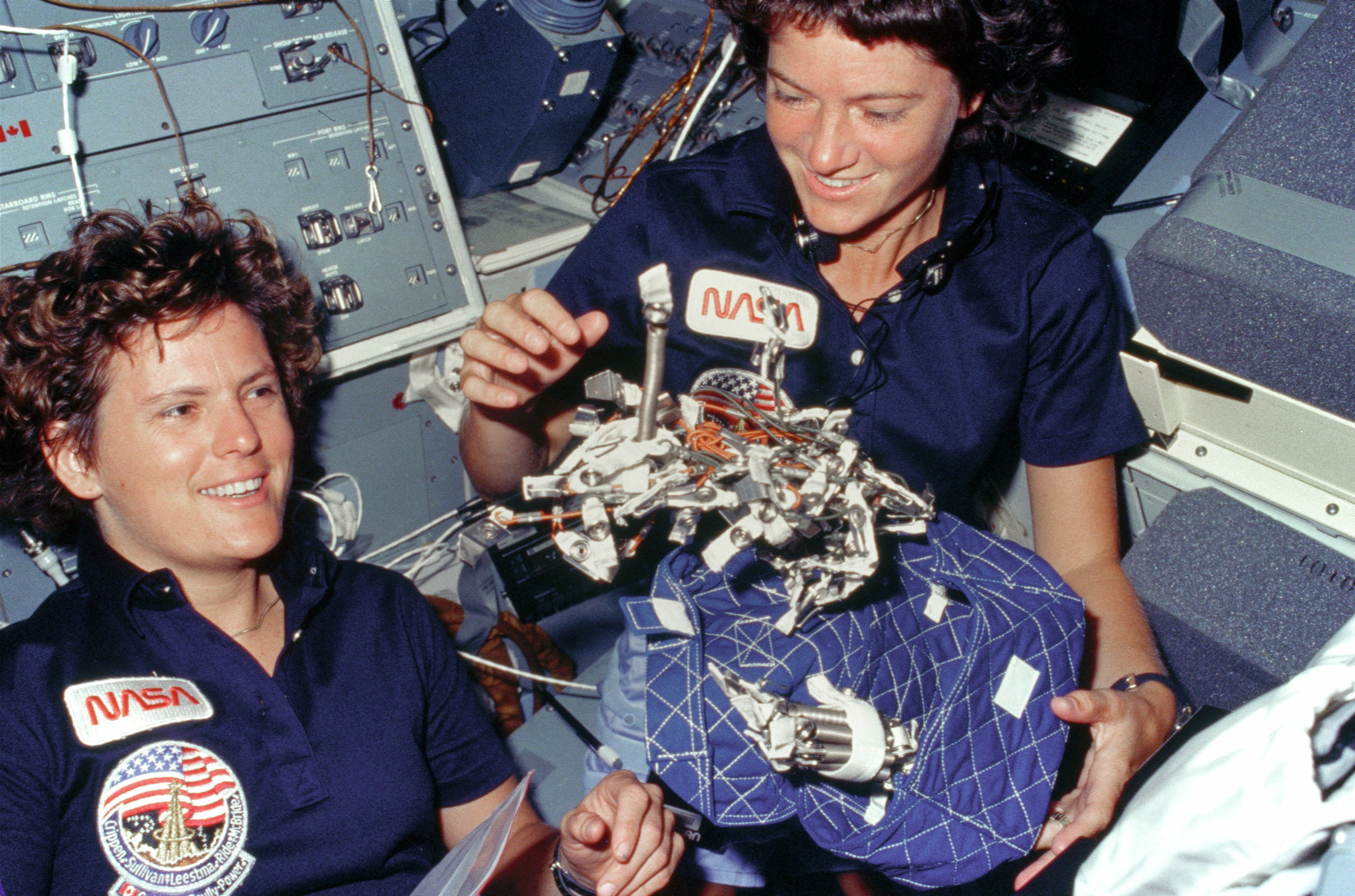
With Sally Ride on STS-41-G

In September 1985 Sullivan was assigned to the STS-61-J mission, which was scheduled to deploy the Hubble Space Telescope (HST) in August 1986. The original intention was that the HST would be periodically retrieved by the Space Shuttle and returned to Earth for maintenance, although some components were designed for servicing in-orbit. In 1984 NASA management decided this would be too dangerous and too costly, and that the HST would instead be maintained in-orbit by periodic servicing missions for up to fifteen years. Convinced that NASA would attempt to fix any component that jeopardized the HST's mission whether it had been designated as serviceable or not, Sullivan pressed for as many components as possible to be replaceable or amenable to in-orbit servicing. Working with fellow astronaut Bruce McCandless II and NASA and Lockheed Corporation engineers, she ensured that there would be a complete set of tools and procedures for as many HST maintenance missions as possible.

The STS-61-J mission was cancelled after the January 1986 Space Shuttle Challenger disaster, but the crew continued to work on the mission objectives. At this point, just fourteen systems were designated as "on-orbit maintainable". There were up to twelve units in each one, so forty-three were designated as Block I "on-orbit replaceable units" (ORUs). Lockheed produced two lists of additional units that could be modified to be serviceable; there were twenty-six systems and fifty-one units in Block II and eight systems and sixteen units in Block III. With more time available, an attempt was now made to work through these. Meanwhile, Sullivan served as capsule communicator (CAPCOM) for STS-26, the Space Shuttle's October 1988 return-to-flight mission. She chose the wakeup music, including a contribution from Robin Williams, who provided a pastiche of his Good Morning, Vietnam radio greeting. She continued working as CAPCOM on the STS-27 and STS-29 missions.

=== STS-31 ===
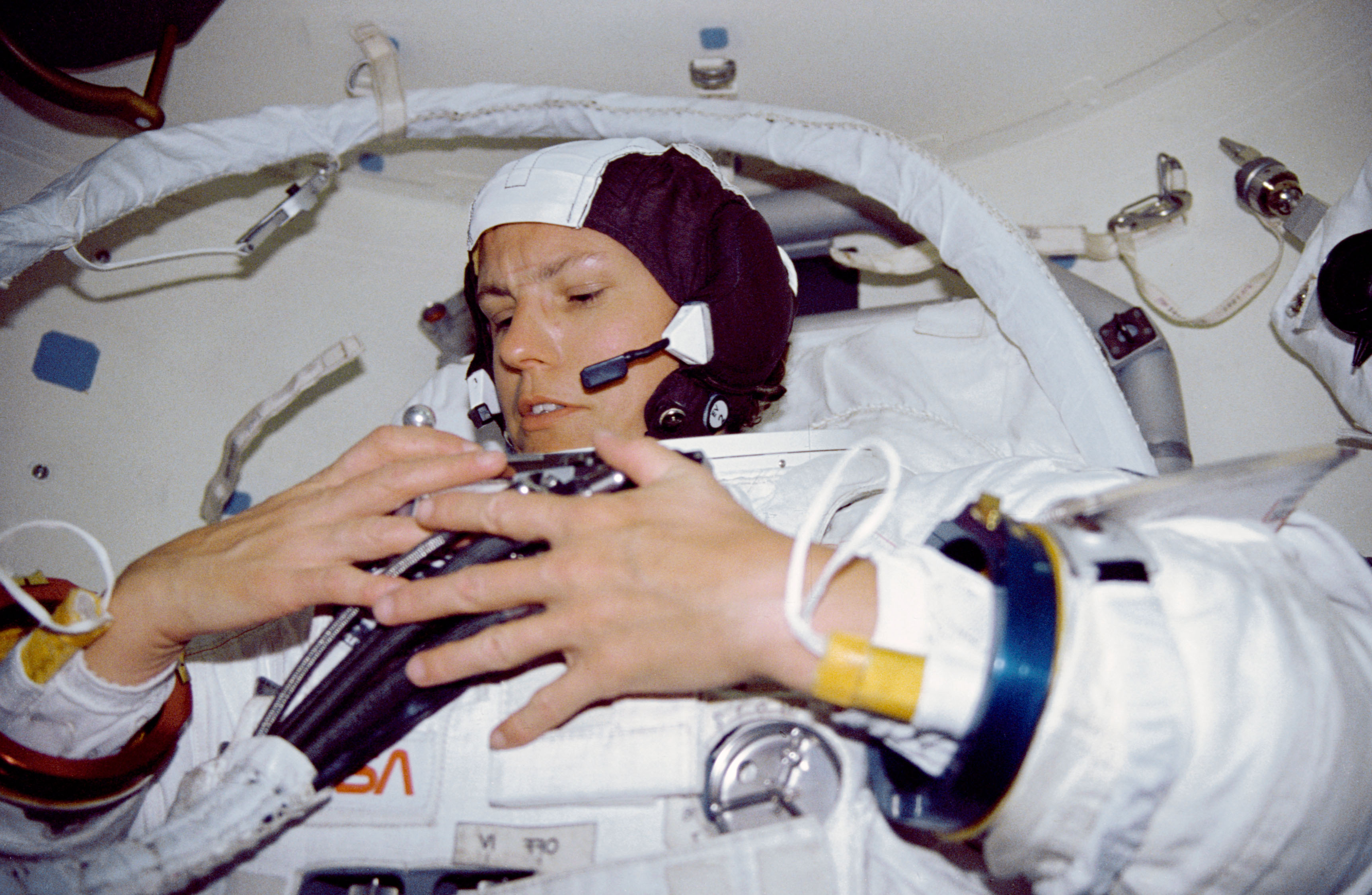
Sullivan dons her space suit in case an EVA was required to support the Hubble Space Telescope deployment on STS-31.

At the end of March 1989, Sullivan returned to working on the HST mission, which was now designated STS-31. The crew was the same, except that Loren Shriver replaced Young as mission commander. STS-31 was launched from KSC, on April 24, 1990. During this five-day mission, crew members aboard the Space Shuttle Discovery deployed the HST, and conducted middeck experiments involving the study of protein crystal growth, polymer membrane processing, and the effects of weightlessness and magnetic fields on an ion arc. They also operated several cameras, including the IMAX cargo bay camera, for Earth observations. Their apogee of 617 kilometers (333 nmi) above Earth was the highest yet achieved by a Space Shuttle orbiter. (It was later exceeded by the STS-82 HST servicing mission.)

The HST was deployed on the second day using Discovery's Canadarm with the Shuttle doors opened towards the ground. In case McCandless and Sullivan had to perform an EVA, the Shuttle's cabin pressure was lowered from 101 kilopascals (14.7 psi) to 28 kilopascals (4.1 psi). At one point McCandless and Sullivan donned their space suits and entered the airlock to perform an emergency EVA to help deploy the Hubble's solar arrays, but this was not required, as the engineers were able to deploy them with a series of commands from Earth. Discovery followed the HST for the next two days in case intervention was required. After making 76 orbits of Earth in 121 hours, Discovery landed at Edwards Air Force Base in California, on April 29, 1990.

=== STS-45 ===
Sullivan served as Payload Commander on STS-45, the first Spacelab mission dedicated to NASA's Mission to Planet Earth. It lifted off in the Atlantis on March 24, 1992. During this nine-day mission, the crew operated the twelve experiments that constituted the Atmospheric Laboratory for Applications and Science cargo. This was the first of several flights designed to study the composition of the mid-atmosphere and its variations over an eleven-year solar cycle, the regular period of energetic activity by the Sun. The mission also included the Shuttle Solar Backscatter Ultraviolet Instrument (SSBUV) to measure the ozone layer in concert with other measurements taken by satellites. The mission also carried the Oscar statuette for the Irving G. Thalberg Memorial Award that film maker George Lucas received on March 30, the presentation being made by the STS-45 crew from Earth orbit. Sullivan had special responsibility for a dose-response experiment that involved firing an electron pulse into the upper atmosphere and recording the luminosity induced with a special camera. Atlantis landed at the Kennedy Space Center on April 2, 1992.

Sullivan left NASA in 1993 having flown on three Space Shuttle missions and logged 532 hours in space.

== Military career ==
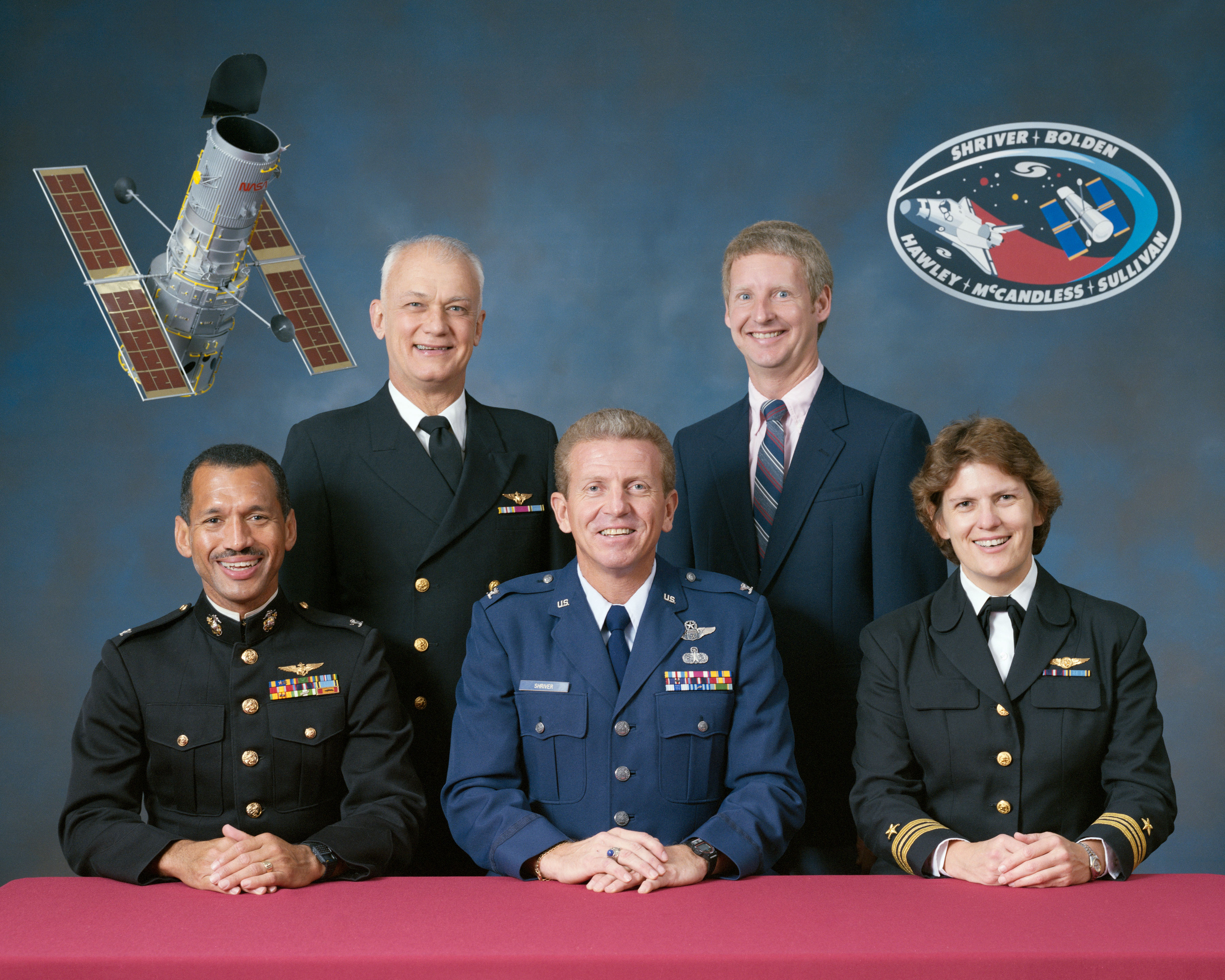
Sullivan in her Navy uniform for the STS-31 crew photo

Sullivan became an adjunct professor of geology at Rice University in Houston in 1985. In this role she joined an oceanographic research cruise in 1988, where she met Andreas Rechnitzer, a US Navy oceanographer, and she started thinking about joining the US Naval Reserve (USNR) as an oceanography officer. She spoke to McCandless about it; he said he was having lunch with the Secretary of the Navy and would raise the matter. Later that year, Sullivan became a direct commission officer in the USNR with the rank of lieutenant commander.

In October 1990 she assumed command of a small specialized unit of oceanographers and meteorologists. Based at Naval Air Station Dallas, it provided support to the Naval Meteorology and Oceanography Command center on Guam. The unit was sent to Guam on January 13, 1991, four days before the start of Operation Desert Storm, and stayed for thirty days to augment the regular component responsible for the Western Pacific to free it to concentrate on the Persian Gulf. She retired from the USNR with the rank of captain in 2006.

== Civilian career ==
=== NOAA Chief Scientist ===
While she was still working on preparations for STS-45, Sullivan received a call from Sylvia Earle, the chief scientist of the National Oceanic and Atmospheric Administration (NOAA). In 1981 Earle and Sullivan had been part of the first group of women admitted to the Explorers Club. Earle was stepping down from the role at the NOAA, and asked Sullivan if she was interested in taking over. With the permission of her STS-45 mission commander, Charles Bolden, Sullivan flew to Washington, DC, where she was interviewed by the Administrator of the NOAA, John A. Knauss. Her nomination was forwarded to the US Senate for confirmation, and she arranged to be seconded from NASA to NOAA as acting chief scientist from August 17, 1992.

Before she could be confirmed, President George H. W. Bush lost the 1992 United States presidential election and was succeeded by Bill Clinton, and the nomination was withdrawn. Sullivan still wanted the job, so she lobbied for it, enlisting the help of the outgoing Secretary of Commerce, Barbara Franklin, and senators Barbara Mikulski and Bill Nelson. The incoming Secretary of Commerce, Ronald H. Brown, forwarded her nomination to the Senate again in April, and she was confirmed on May 28, 1993. As chief scientist at NOAA, she oversaw a diverse portfolio which included ranging research into climate change, the use of satellites for oceanography, and marine biodiversity.

=== Career 1996 to 2011 ===
Sullivan was president and CEO of COSI, an interactive science center in Columbus, Ohio, from 1996 to 2006. From 2006 to 2011 she was Director for Ohio State University's Battelle Center for Mathematics and Science Education Policy while remaining a volunteer science advisor to COSI. She was appointed as vice chair of the National Science Board by President George W. Bush in 2004. In 2009 Sullivan was elected to a three-year term as the chair of the Section on General Interest in Science and Engineering for the American Association for the Advancement of Science.

=== Assistant Secretary of Commerce ===
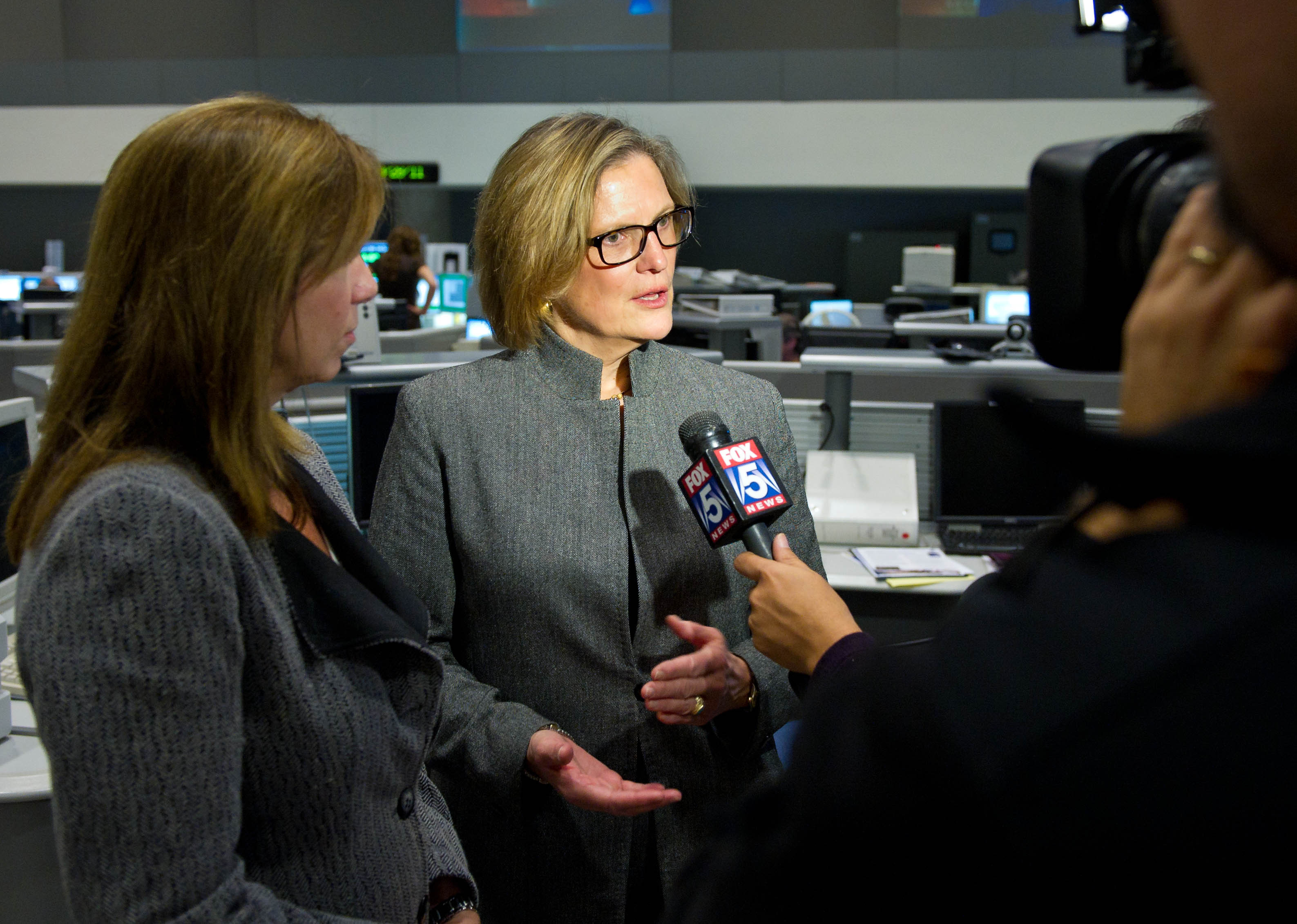
Interviewed on television after the launch of the National Polar-orbiting Operational Environmental Satellite System Preparatory Project (NPP) in 2011

In January 2011 President Barack Obama sent the Senate his nomination of Sullivan to be an Assistant Secretary of Commerce. Sullivan was first nominated in December 2010, but because the Senate did not approve her nomination before the session ended, the White House renewed the nomination. On May 4, 2011, Sullivan was confirmed by unanimous consent of the Senate and appointed by President Obama to serve as Assistant Secretary of Commerce for Environmental Observation and Prediction and Deputy Administrator for the National Oceanic and Atmospheric Administration. Sullivan became Acting Under Secretary of Commerce for Oceans and Atmosphere and Acting NOAA Administrator on February 28, 2013, following the resignation of Jane Lubchenco. President Obama nominated Sullivan to serve as the Under Secretary of Commerce for Oceans and Atmosphere and NOAA Administrator on August 1, 2013, and she was confirmed by the Senate on March 6, 2014. Her term ended on January 20, 2017.

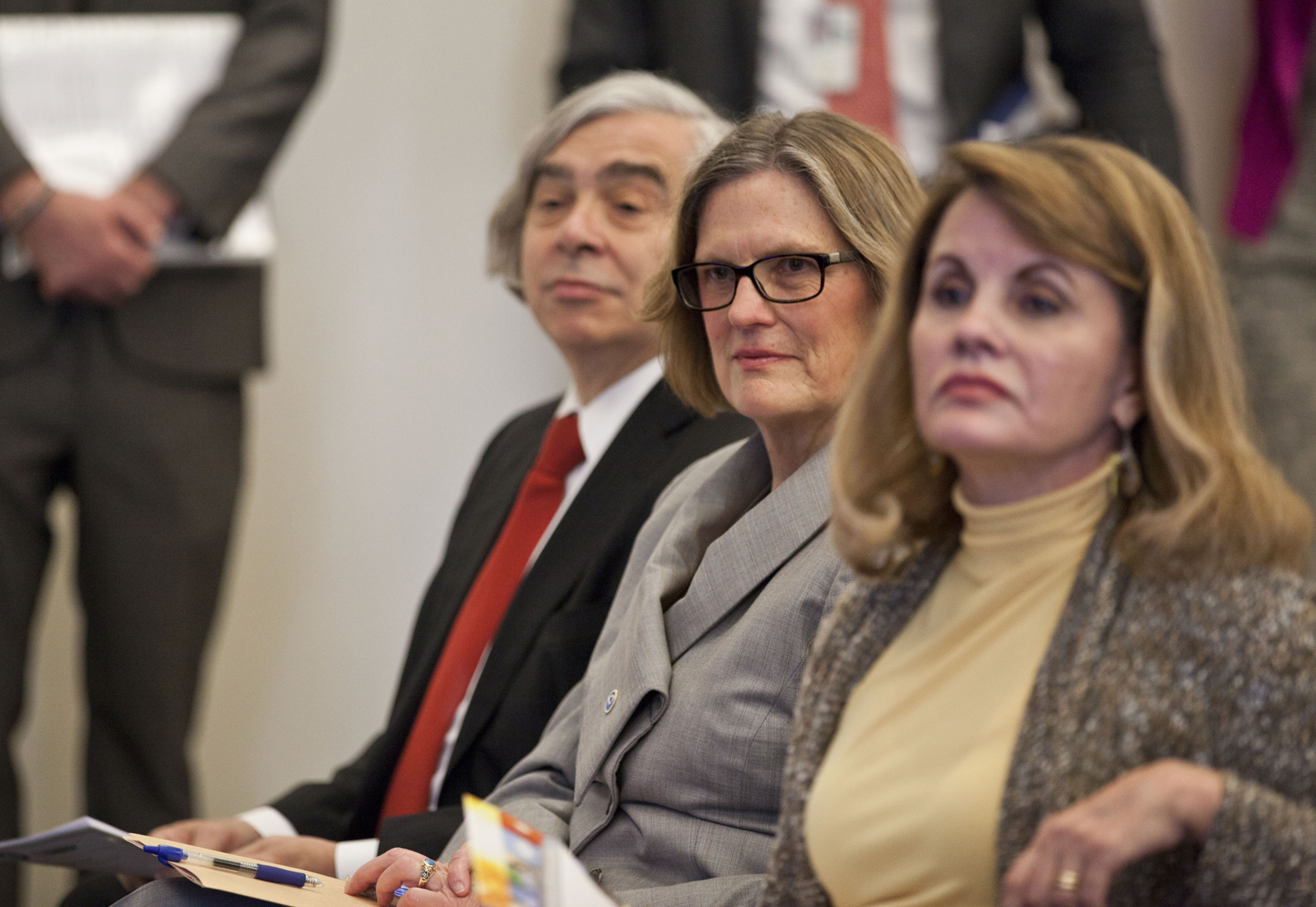
At the White House Leadership Summit on Women, Climate and Energy in May 2013

=== Positions since 2017 ===
Sullivan was named the 2017 Charles A. Lindbergh Chair of Aerospace History, a competitive twelve-month fellowship at the National Air and Space Museum. During her residence in the museum, Sullivan's research focused on the Hubble Space Telescope. She has also served as a Senior Fellow at the Potomac Institute for Policy Studies. Her book Handprints on Hubble: An Astronaut's Story of Invention was released from MIT Press in November 2019. It recounted her experience as part of the team that launched, rescued, repaired, and maintained the Hubble Space Telescope.

In June 2020 Sullivan traveled on an expedition aboard the Triton Submarines DSV Limiting Factor to the bottom of the Challenger Deep in the Mariana Trench, becoming the first woman and eighth person to reach the deepest known point in Earth's oceans, and the first person to travel both to Challenger Deep and into space. In November 2020 Sullivan was named a volunteer member of Joe Biden's presidential transition Agency Review Team to support transition efforts related to the Department of Commerce, and he appointed her to the President's Council of Advisors on Science and Technology in September 2021.

== Awards and recognition ==
Sullivan's awards from NASA included the NASA Space Flight Medal in 1984, 1990 and 1992; the NASA Exceptional Service Medal in 1988 and 1991, the NASA Outstanding Leadership Medal in 1992, and a Certificate of Appreciation in 1996. She received the Haley Space Flight Award in 1991, the Gold Medal of the Society of Woman Geographers in 1993, the Golden Plate Award of the American Academy of Achievement in 1994, and the Adler Planetarium Women in Space Science Award in 2004.

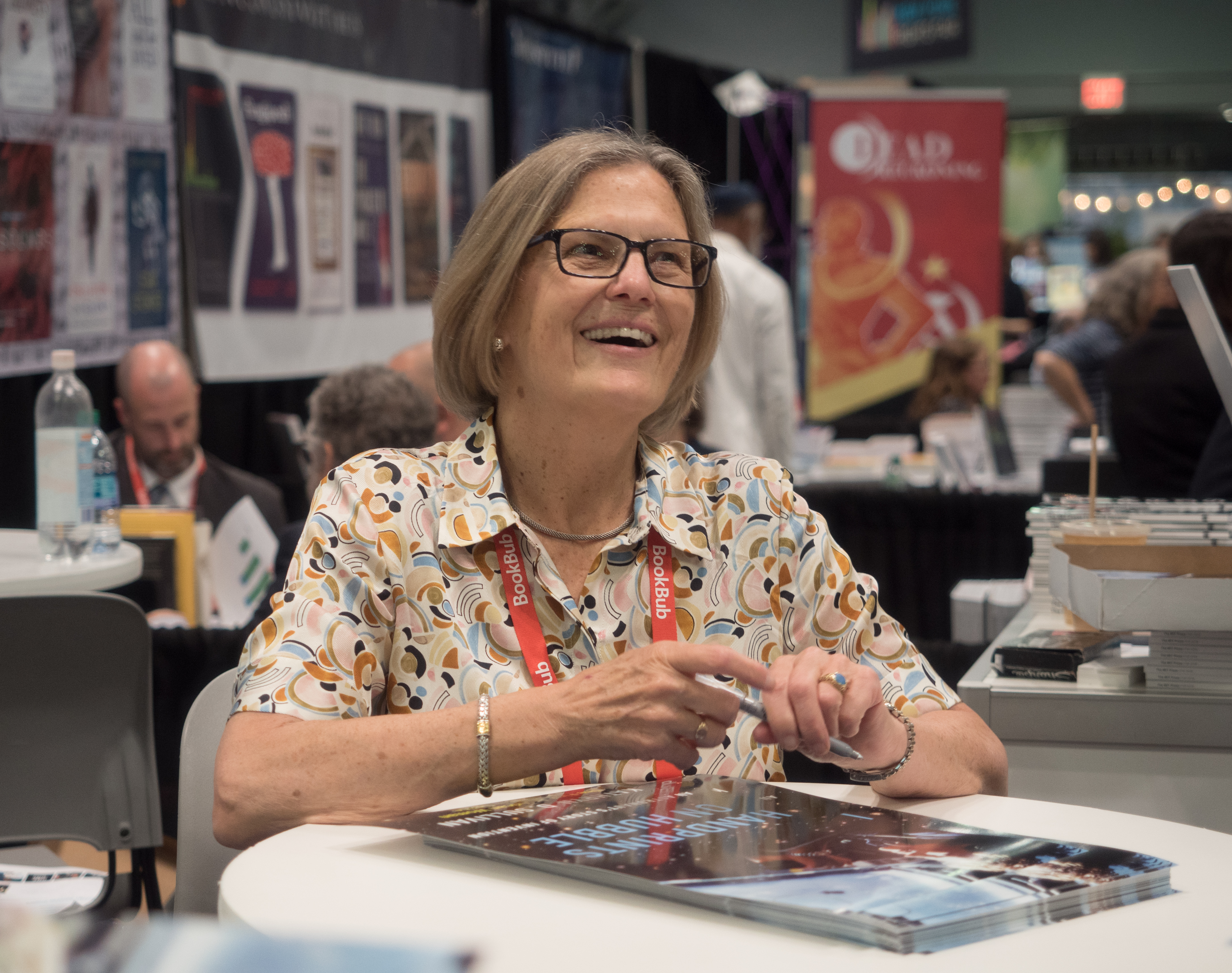
At the 2019 BookExpo America signing autographs for Handprints on Hubble

In 2014 Sullivan was named in the Time 100 list, an annual list of the world's most influential people. John Glenn wrote in her blurb:

Kathy is not just an ivory-tower scientist. She was part of NASA's first class of female astronauts, selected in 1978, and went on to fly three shuttle missions. She is the first American woman to walk in space and served aboard the mission that deployed the Hubble Space Telescope. That role in helping humanity look outward has not prevented her from looking homeward. The planet is suffering increasingly severe upheavals, at least partly a result of climate change—droughts, floods, typhoons, tornadoes. I believe my good friend Kathy is the right person for the right job at the right time.

Sullivan received honorary Doctor of Science degrees from Willamette University in 2013 in conjunction with her presentation of a commencement address, and from Brown University in May 2015, for her "abundant contributions to science, education and the public good, and her ongoing commitment to improving the state of our planet for future generations". In September 2015 she presented the John H. Glenn Lecture in Space History Series at the Smithsonian National Air and Space Museum in Washington, D.C. Titled "Looking at Earth: An Astronaut's Journey", Sullivan discussed her life of exploration and discovery, what it is like to fulfill her childhood dreams, and how NOAA's study of our planet helps us understand today's environmental challenges.

Sullivan was inducted into the Astronaut Hall of Fame in 2004, elected to the National Academy of Engineering in 2016, and the American Academy of Arts and Sciences in 2017. In 2020 the American Association of Geographers named her Honorary Geographer. She was on the list of the BBC's 100 Women announced on November 23, 2020. In September 2023, Sullivan was inducted into the National Aviation Hall of Fame in Dayton, Ohio.

== See also ==
- List of female astronauts
- List of people who descended to Challenger Deep

== Notes ==
Government offices
Preceded by Jane Lubchenco	Administrator of the National Oceanic and Atmospheric Administration; 2014–2017	Succeeded by Rick Spinrad
