= List of Department of Commerce appointments by Joe Biden =

Below is a list of nominations and appointments to the Department of Commerce by Joe Biden, the 46th president of the United States. As of July 31, 2024, according to tracking by The Washington Post and Partnership for Public Service, 18 nominees have been confirmed, 1 nominee is being considered by the Senate, 4 positions do not have a nominee, and 1 appointment has been made that does not require Senate confirmation.

== Color key ==
Denotes appointees awaiting Senate confirmation.

Denotes appointees serving in an acting capacity.

Denotes appointees who have left office or offices which have been disbanded.

== Leadership ==
| Office | Nominee | Assumed office | Left office |
|---|---|---|---|
| — Secretary of Commerce | Gina Raimondo | March 3, 2021 (Confirmed March 2, 2021, 84–15) | — |
| — Deputy Secretary of Commerce | Don Graves | May 14, 2021 (Confirmed May 13, 2021, 89–7) | — |

== Office of the Secretary & Deputy Secretary ==
| Office | Nominee | Assumed office | Left office |
|---|---|---|---|
| — General Counsel of Commerce | Leslie Kiernan | June 15, 2021 (Confirmed June 10, 2021 by voice vote) | — |
| — Assistant Secretary of Commerce (Communications and Information) & Administrator of the National Telecommunications and Information Administration | Alan Davidson | January 14, 2022 (Confirmed January 11, 2022, 60–31) | — |
| — Assistant Secretary of Commerce (Legislative and Intergovernmental Affairs) | Susie Feliz | September 6, 2022 (Confirmed August 4, 2022 by voice vote) | — |
| — Assistant Secretary of Commerce (Economic Development) & Administrator of the Economic Development Administration | Alejandra Castillo | August 13, 2021 (Confirmed August 11, 2021 by voice vote) | — |
| — Director of the National Technical Information Service | Jeremiah Jones | September 30, 2023 | — |

== Office of Economic Affairs ==
| Office | Nominee | Assumed office | Left office |
|---|---|---|---|
| — Under Secretary of Commerce (Economic Affairs) | Jed Kolko | April 19, 2022 (Confirmed April 7, 2022 by voice vote) | February 2, 2024 |
| — Director of the United States Census Bureau | Robert Santos | January 5, 2022 (Confirmed November 4, 2021, 58–35) | — |

== Office of Industry and Security ==
| Office | Nominee | Assumed office | Left office |
|---|---|---|---|
| — Under Secretary of Commerce (Industry and Security) & Head of the Bureau of Industry and Security | Alan Estevez | April 19, 2022 (Confirmed March 31, 2022 by voice vote) | — |
| — Assistant Secretary of Commerce (Export Administration) | Thea Kendler | December 15, 2021 (Confirmed December 14, 2021 by voice vote) | — |
| — Assistant Secretary of Commerce (Export Enforcement) | Matthew S. Axelrod | January 3, 2022 (Confirmed December 18, 2021 by voice vote) | — |

== Office of International Trade ==
| Office | Nominee | Assumed office | Left office |
|---|---|---|---|
| — Under Secretary of Commerce (International Trade) & Administrator of the International Trade Administration | Marisa Lago | December 28, 2021 (Confirmed December 16, 2021 by voice vote) | — |
| — Assistant Secretary of Commerce (Enforcement and Compliance) | Lisa Wang | January 6, 2022 (Confirmed December 16, 2021 by voice vote) | February 7, 2024 |
| — Assistant Secretary of Commerce (Industry and Analysis) | Grant Harris | April 19, 2022 (Confirmed April 7, 2022 by voice vote) | — |
| — Assistant Secretary of Commerce (Global Markets) & Director General of the United States Commercial Service | Arun Venkataraman | April 25, 2022 (Confirmed April 7, 2022 by voice vote) | — |

== Office of Oceans & Atmosphere and the National Oceanic and Atmospheric Administration ==
| Office | Nominee | Assumed office | Left office |
|---|---|---|---|
| — Under Secretary of Commerce (Oceans and Atmosphere) & Administrator of National Oceanic and Atmospheric Administration (NOAA) | Rick Spinrad | June 22, 2021 (Confirmed June 17, 2021 by voice vote) | — |
| — Assistant Secretary of Commerce (Oceans and Atmosphere) and Deputy Administrator of NOAA | Jainey K. Bavishi | January 17, 2023 (Confirmed December 22, 2022 by voice vote) | — |
| — Assistant Secretary of Commerce (Environmental Observation and Prediction) | Michael C. Morgan | July 19, 2022 (Confirmed July 14, 2022 by voice vote) | — |

== Other Under Secretaries ==
| Office | Nominee | Assumed office | Left office |
|---|---|---|---|
| — Under Secretary of Commerce (Intellectual Property) & Director of the United States Patent and Trademark Office | Kathi Vidal | April 19, 2022 (Confirmed April 5, 2022 by voice vote) | December 16, 2024 |
| — Under Secretary of Commerce (Minority Business Development) & Director of the Minority Business Development Agency | Donald R. Cravins | August 15, 2022 (Confirmed August 4, 2022 by voice vote) | January 12, 2024 |
| — Under Secretary of Commerce (Standards and Technology) & Director of the National Institute of Standards and Technology | Laurie E. Locascio | April 19, 2022 (Confirmed April 7, 2022 by voice vote) | December 31, 2024 |

== Withdrawn nominations ==
| Office | Nominee | Announced | Withdrawn | Notes |
|---|---|---|---|---|
| — Chief Financial Officer & Assistant Secretary of Commerce (Administration) | Viquar Ahmad | August 18, 2021 | January 3, 2023 | |
| — Inspector General of Commerce | Lisa M. Re | July 31, 2024 | January 3, 2025 | |

== See also ==
- Cabinet of Joe Biden, for the vetting process undergone by top-level roles including advice and consent by the Senate
- List of executive branch 'czars' e.g. Special Advisor to the President

== Notes ==
Confirmation votes

Confirmations by roll call vote

Confirmations by voice vote
