= List of directors of the National Institute of Standards and Technology =

The National Institute of Standards and Technology succeeded the National Bureau of Standards in 1988. Following is a list of the directors of both agencies. The number of NIST directors is a continuation of the number of NBS directors since Raman is considered the 18th NIST director.

No.	Image	Director	Term start	Term end	Refs.
1		Samuel W. Stratton	1901	1922	
2		George K. Burgess	1923	1932	
3		Lyman J. Briggs	1932	1945	
4		Edward U. Condon	1945	1951	
5		Allen V. Astin (Note: Forced to resign over AD-X2 battery additive fraud that he stood up against - reinstated after 5 months after public and scientific uproar.)	1951	1969	
6		Lewis M. Branscomb	1969	1972	
7		Richard W. Roberts	1973	1975	
acting		Ernest Ambler (Note: He was first appointed as director of NBS and continued as director of NIST following the agency's reorganization in 1988.)	1975	1977	
8		Ernest Ambler	1977	1989	
9		John W. Lyons	1990	1993	
10		Arati Prabhakar	May 1993	1997	
acting		Robert Hebner	1997	November 1997	
11		Raymond G. Kammer	November 12, 1997	December 2000	
acting		Karen Brown	December 2000	December 2001	
12		Arden L. Bement Jr.	December 2001	November 2004	
acting		Hratch Semerjian	November 2004	July 2005	
13		William A. Jeffrey	July 26, 2005	September 2, 2007	
acting		James M. Turner	September 3, 2007	September 2008	
acting		Patrick D. Gallagher	September 2008	November 5, 2009	
14		Patrick D. Gallagher	November 5, 2009	June 13, 2014	
acting		Willie E. May	June 14, 2014	May 3, 2015	
15		Willie E. May	May 4, 2015	January 3, 2017	
Acting		Kent Rochford	January 4, 2017	October 15, 2017	
16		Walter Copan	October 16, 2017	January 19, 2021	
acting		James K. Olthoff	January 20, 2021	April 18, 2022	
17		Laurie E. Locascio	April 19, 2022	December 31, 2024	
acting		Charles H. Romine	January 1, 2025	January 20, 2025	
acting		Craig Burkhardt	January 20, 2025	June 29, 2026	
18		Arvind Raman	June 30, 2026	Present	

Table notes:
