= Peggy Lucas =

Margaret "Peggy" E. Lucas (born 1942) is a retired business-person and public servant based in Minneapolis, Minnesota. She co-founded Brighton Development Corporation and was integral to rebuilding parts of the Minneapolis waterfront, with a particularly active period in the 1990s. She served on the board of regents for St John's University and the University of Minnesota and as the vice-president of the League of Women Voters, among other civic contributions.

== Early life and education ==
Lucas was a Chinese refugee following the second Sino-Japanese war and came to the United States as a child. She grew up in Mound, Minnesota and was a high school cheerleader. She graduated from the University of Minnesota in 1963 with a bachelor's degree in social work and was awarded a master's in social work in 1978. She met her husband, David Lucas, while an undergraduate at University and together they joined the Peace Corps. The couple lived in Iran from 1965 to 1967. Upon return to the United States, Lucas pursued a career and additional education in social work while taking some time out for the births of two sons in the late 1960s and early 1970s.

== Developer ==
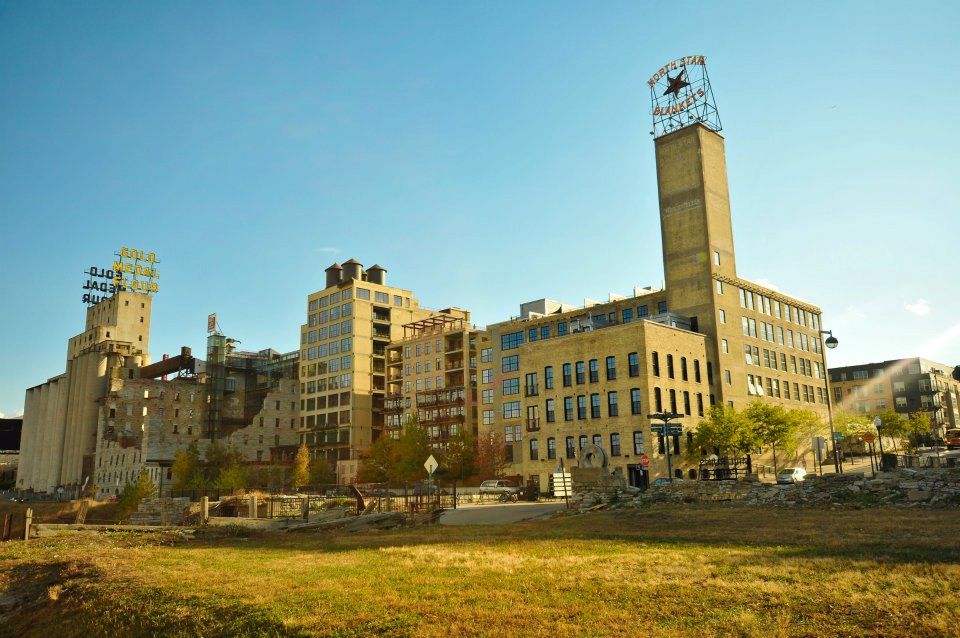
The North Star Woolen Mill, following redevelopment by Lucas' firm. The original sign remains.

While serving as co-chair for the League of Women Voters' housing committee, Lucas and a friend complained that many of the new affordable housing developments built in the Twin Cities did not fit in with the existing character of the neighborhoods where they were built. The reply, from an unnamed government official, was ‘Well, if you girls think it’s so easy, why don’t you give it a try?’ Lucas co-founded Brighton Development Corporation in the early 1980s with Dick Brustad and Linda Donaldson. According to Brustad, Donaldson and Lucas were unusual, as nearly all developers at the time were men, who often transitioned from construction careers. “There was virtually no woman in the field,” he commented.

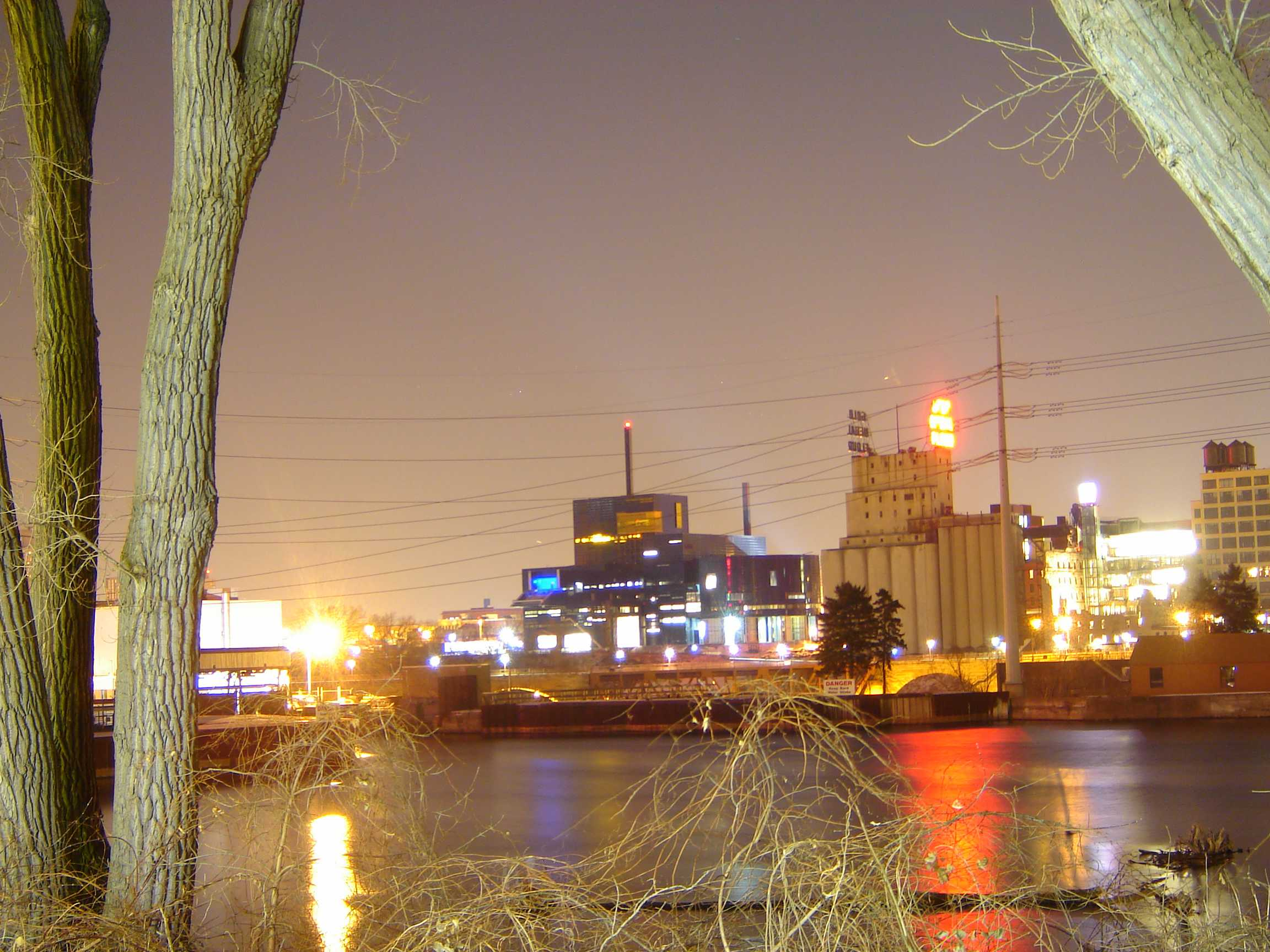
View from across the Mississippi river of the revitalized Mill District, including the Guthrie Theater and Mill City Museum. Lucas' work in revitalizing the North Star blanket mill helped kick-start the redevelopment of this area.

The firm's specialty was the development of more difficult, smaller inner city lots. All three co-founders were interested in affordable housing, and many, though not all, of their initial projects were built in partnership with not-for-profit organizations. According to Donaldson, through revitalizing old buildings or developing new construction in the heart of the city, the firm found its niche in its first years, as many of the more established developers were focused on new builds in the suburbs. Lucas and her co-founders believed that new buildings should fit into the character of the neighborhood and should have support from the existing community.

An early high-profile project saw the firm redevelop a riverfront site on East Hennepin Avenue into upscale townhouses, now known as Lourdes Square. Previously, the lot had been the site of a grand Victorian exposition hall, which hosted major events, including the 1892 Republican National Convention. According to the Saturday Evening Spectator in 1887, the exposition hall was the "greatest development ever made by any city on the globe," a symbol of a burgeoning city on the rise. Unfortunately, the hall fall into disuse and was torn town and re-made into a Coca-Cola bottling plant in the 1940s. By the time Brighton acquired the site, the old plant had also been razed. The subsequent development sought to tie the prominently-located building into the existing neighborhood through a mix of modern and traditional design and placement and became a sought-after address.

The firm rehabilitated the North Star Woolen Mill into the North Star Lofts, a project that sparked a much larger redevelopment of a whole area of downtown Minneapolis on the Mississippi waterfront, known as the Mill District, which now includes the Guthrie theater, along with hotels and retail spaces.

In retrospect, Lucas identified a pattern to some of their most impactful developments, as "catalytic projects". Her firm specialized in finding areas that had hidden potential, such as empty lots and abandoned warehouses, in what are now prime downtown and riverfront locations. Once Brighton demonstrated the market for an area, larger developers would get involved and continue to build out the neighborhood. As a result, Lucas is credited with helping "transform the once-neglected Minneapolis riverfront" as "the force behind the riverfront revival in Minneapolis."

Lucas was named one of the "25 most influential businesswomen" by the Minneapolis-St. Paul Business Journal and won the Steve Murray Award for distinguished achievement in historical preservation from the Minneapolis Chapter of the American Institute of Architects and the Minneapolis Heritage Preservation Commission in 2004.

== Public Service ==
Lucas served as vice president and National Director of the League of Women Voters. She was appointed to the University of Minnesota Board of Regents in 2013. While serving, she voted against a measure to rename several University buildings bearing the names of historical figures whose legacy had come under question, arguing that it was important to preserve the history of the university, even when controversial. She hoped to improve ties between the university and surrounding neighborhoods. While a regent, Lucas and fellow board members hired the first female president of the university, Joan Gabel. Towards the end of her term, in 2019, Lucas wrote an op-ed arguing that the Minnesota State Legislature should work to restore and maintain the university's existing infrastructure.
