= Alan B. Davidson =

American attorney

Alan Davidson
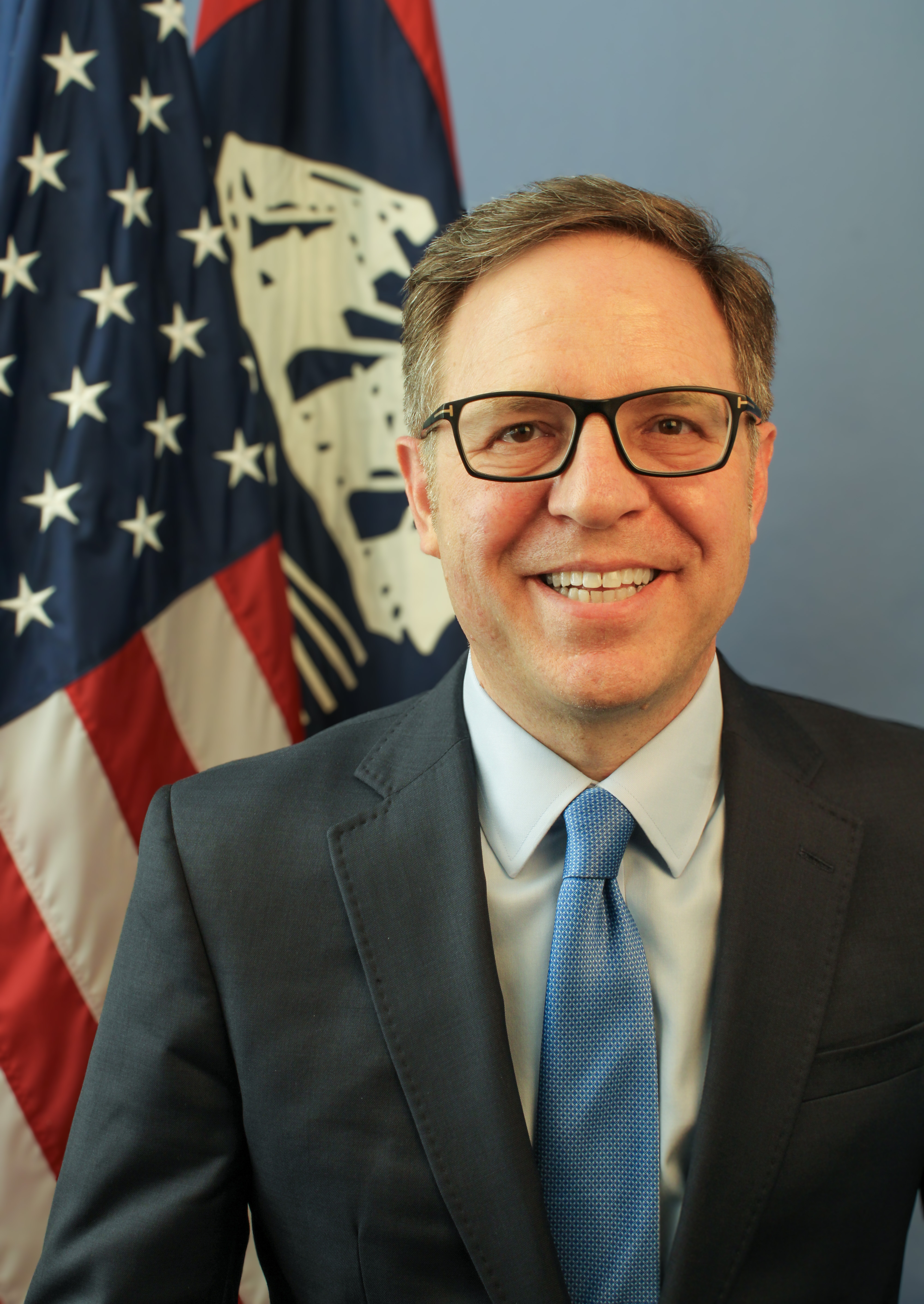

Assistant Secretary of Commerce for Communications and Information
- In office January 14, 2022 – January 20, 2025
- President: Joe Biden
- Preceded by: Evelyn Remaley (acting)
- Succeeded by: Arielle Roth

Personal details
- Education: Massachusetts Institute of Technology (BS, MS); Yale University (JD)

Alan B. Davidson is an American government official and attorney who served as Assistant Secretary of Commerce for Communications and Information from 2022 to 2025. In this role, Davidson serves as Administrator of the National Telecommunications and Information Administration (NTIA).

Davidson previously served within the Department of Commerce during the Obama Administration, where he served as director of digital economy. Prior to joining the NTIA, Davidson worked at the Mozilla Foundation, where he was a senior adviser and former vice president. Earlier in his career, Davidson worked at non-profit advocacy organizations including the Center for Democracy and Technology (CDT), and as a public policy staffer for Google.

== Education ==
Davidson received a bachelor's degree in mathematics and computer science and a master's degree in technology and policy from the Massachusetts Institute of Technology (MIT). He later attended Yale Law School, where he was symposium editor of the Yale Law Journal.

== Career ==
Davidson began his career as a computer scientist and later joined Booz Allen & Hamilton as a senior consultant.

=== Google ===
Davidson was hired as Google’s first policy staffer in 2005, and has been credited with helping boost the firm's lobbying presence in Washington, D.C. During his time in the role, which concluded in 2012, he helped the company as it navigated scrutiny by the Department of Justice (DOJ). Davidson testified before the Senate Committee on the Judiciary's Subcommittee on Privacy, Technology and the Law on Google's behalf in 2010.

=== Obama Administration ===
In 2015, he joined the Department of Commerce as the first director of digital economy. According to a report by Politico, Davidson's appointment was motivated by the fact that while "[Department of] Commerce has its fingers in nearly every Internet policy debate taking place today", the department "has lacked a unified voice on those issues."

=== Advocacy work ===
In addition to his private sector work, Davidson worked at advocacy organizations including the Center for Democracy and Technology (CDT) and the New America Foundation. At the time of his nomination to lead the NTIA, Davidson was a senior adviser and former vice president at the Mozilla Foundation.

== National Telecommunications and Information Administration (NTIA) ==
=== Nomination ===
In 2021, Davidson was nominated by President Joe Biden to serve as director of the NTIA. At the time of his nomination, the NTIA was led by acting administrator Evelyn Remaley. On January 11, 2022, he was confirmed by the United States Senate in a 60–31 vote.

=== Tenure ===
Davidson was sworn into office on January 14, 2022. Under Davidson's leadership, the NTIA will be tasked with allocating the $48 billion in funding for broadband deployment included in the Infrastructure Investment and Jobs Act of 2021. In December 2022, Davidson praised the initial draft of a national broadband map, which was produced by the Federal Communications Commission (FCC).

In 2023, the NTIA released a report on app store competition that concluded that Google and Apple serve as "gatekeepers" of the app market ecosystem. In a call with journalists, Davidson said that the report concluded that Google and Apple's administration of the Play Store and App Store, respectively, show "real potential harm for consumers" by "inflating prices and reducing innovation".
