= Susie Feliz =

American lobbyist and political advisor

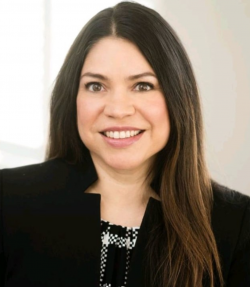

Assistant Secretary of Commerce for Legislative and Intergovernmental Affairs
- In office September 6, 2022 – January 20, 2025
- President: Joe Biden
- Preceded by: Michael Platt Jr. (2019)
- Succeeded by: Harry Kumar

Personal details
- Born: Susie de Los Angeles Saavedra
- Education: University of Denver (BA); George Washington University (MPA)

Susie Feliz is an American lobbyist, political advisor and politician who is serving as the assistant secretary of commerce for legislative and intergovernmental affairs in the Biden administration.

== Education ==
Feliz earned a Bachelor of Arts degree in public affairs and biology from the University of Denver and a Master of Public Administration from the George Washington University.

== Career ==
From 2002 to 2005, Feliz worked as a legislative aide for Senator Hillary Clinton. She was then the legislative director for Texas Congressman Al Green and California Congresswoman Karen Bass. She joined the National Urban League in 2013 and has since worked as the organization's senior director of health and education policy, senior director for policy and legislative affairs, and vice president for policy and legislative affairs.

=== Assistant Secretary of Commerce ===
On March 11, 2022, President Joe Biden nominated Feliz to be an assistant secretary of commerce for legislative and intergovernmental affairs. On August 4, 2022, her nomination was confirmed in the Senate by voice vote. She was sworn into office on September 6, 2022.

== Personal life ==
In 2018, Feliz married Jose Luis Feliz, a United States Navy captain and assistant commander in the Naval Supply Systems Command.
