= Assistant Secretary for Legislative Affairs =

The Assistant Secretary for Legislative Affairs may refer to:

- The Assistant Secretary of State for Legislative Affairs, located in the U.S. Department of State
- The Assistant Secretary of Defense for Legislative Affairs, located in the U.S. Department of Defense
- The Assistant Secretary of the Treasury for Legislative Affairs, located in the U.S. Department of the Treasury
- The Assistant Secretary of Commerce for Legislative and Intergovernmental Affairs, located in the U.S. Department of Commerce
