= Michael Platt Jr. =

American political aide (born 1974)

Michael Richard Platt Jr.
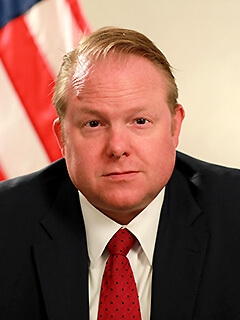

Assistant Secretary of Commerce for Legislative and Intergovernmental Affairs
- In office August 3, 2017 – July 8, 2019
- President: Donald Trump
- Preceded by: Steve Haro
- Succeeded by: Susie Feliz

Personal details
- Born: 1974 (age 50–51)
- Political party: Republican
- Education: University of Arkansas at Fayetteville (BA)

Michael Richard Platt Jr. (born 1974) is an American political aide and government official who served as Assistant Secretary for Legislative and Intergovernmental Affairs during the Trump administration. Prior to assuming this position, he was chief of staff for U.S. Representative Marsha Blackburn of Tennessee's 7th congressional district.

== Education ==
In 1996, Platt obtained a Bachelor of Arts degree in political science from the University of Arkansas at Fayetteville.

== Career ==
Platt began his career as a legislative staffer for Asa Hutchinson, who was then serving as the U.S. representative for Arkansas's 3rd congressional district. He went on to work as a lobbyist for the Recording Industry Association of America and TechNet.

Platt advised Congresswoman Marsha Blackburn on various public policy issues including telecommunications, trade, and intellectual property. He then served as Blackburn's chief of staff before being confirmed as Assistant Secretary of Commerce for Legislative and Intergovernmental Affairs in August 2017.
