= Amitabh Varshney =

American computer scientist

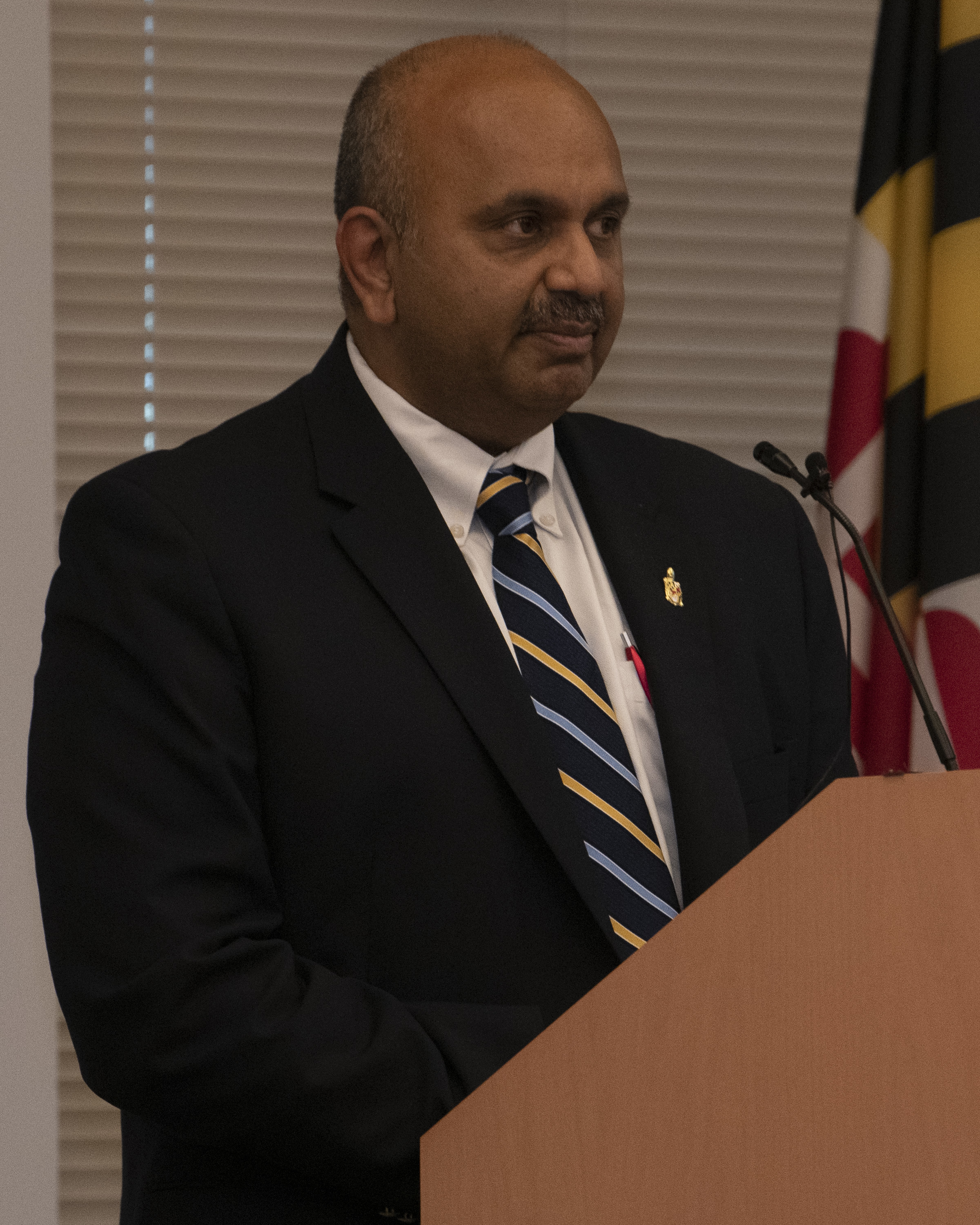
- Amitabh Varshney in 2021
- Born: c. 1967
- Education: Indian Institute of Technology, Delhi; University of North Carolina, Chapel Hill
- Occupations: Computer scientist, professor, dean
- Known for: Simplification envelopes, mesh saliency, virtual memory palaces
- Predecessor: Jayanth Banavar
- Website: www.cs.umd.edu/~varshney/

Amitabh Varshney is an Indian-born American computer scientist. He is a professor of computer science at the University of Maryland, College Park and since March 2018, he has served as Dean of the University of Maryland College of Computer, Mathematical, and Natural Sciences. He directed the University of Maryland Institute for Advanced Computer Studies (UMIACS) from 2010 to 2018. Twice, he served as the university's interim vice president for research. His research spans computer graphics, scientific visualization, and virtual and augmented reality, including level-of-detail modeling, mesh saliency, foveated rendering, and immersive systems for medicine and education. He is a Fellow of the IEEE and a member of the IEEE Visualization Academy.

== Early Life and Education ==
Varshney received a B.Tech. in Computer Science and Engineering from the Indian Institute of Technology Delhi in 1989, and M.S. (1991) and Ph.D. (1994) degrees in computer science from the University of North Carolina at Chapel Hill, where his advisor was Fred Brooks. His dissertation was titled Hierarchical Geometric Approximations.

== Academic career ==
Varshney was an assistant professor of computer science at Stony Brook University from 1994 to 2000. He joined the University of Maryland in 2000 as an associate professor and became a full professor in 2006. He directed UMIACS from July 2010 to February 2018. In spring 2016, he co-taught, with Derek Juba, the university's first course in virtual and augmented reality. He served as the university's interim Vice President for Research from October 2016 to September 2017, and again from October 2021 to January 2022, the second time for the joint College Park and Baltimore research enterprise. In January 2018, he was named Dean of CMNS, succeeding Jayanth Banavar, and took office in March 2018; he was reappointed to a second five-year term in July 2023.

=== Director of the University of Maryland Institute for Advanced Computer Studies (2010–2018) ===
Varshney directed the University of Maryland Institute for Advanced Computer Studies from July 2010 to February 2018, succeeding V. S. Subrahmanian, who had led the institute since 2004. He was reappointed to a second five-year term in 2015. During his tenure the institute grew from 62 faculty members to more than 70 faculty and research scientists drawn from eleven departments. As director, Varshney:

- Co-founded the Maryland Cybersecurity Center (2010), a joint effort of computer science, engineering, public policy and business;
- Launched within UMIACS the Joint Center for Quantum Information and Computer Science (QuICS), a partnership with the National Institute of Standards and Technology (2014), whose NIST funding was renewed in 2021 at up to $12.2 million over five years;
- Committed institutional funding to establish the Maryland Center for Women in Computing (2014), after which the number of women majoring in computer science at Maryland rose from 318 in 2014 to 738 in 2019;
- Founded the Augmentarium, a VR/AR and visual-computing laboratory, with an NSF Major Research Instrumentation award (2014); and
- Led the College Park side of the Center for Health-related Informatics and Bioimaging (CHIB), a joint center with the University of Maryland, Baltimore under the MPower partnership (2012); and co-founded, and co-directs with Sarah Murthi, the Maryland Blended Reality Center with the University of Maryland School of Medicine (2017), whose VR trauma-surgery training was covered by Communications of the ACM.

=== Dean of the College of Computer, Mathematical, and Natural Sciences (2018–present) ===
Varshney was named dean in January 2018 after a national search and took office on March 1, 2018, succeeding Jayanth Banavar; Gerald Wilkinson, a professor of biology, served as interim dean from October 2017 until Varshney took office. He was reappointed to a second five-year term effective July 1, 2023. The college is the university's largest, with ten departments, more than 1,000 faculty members, and more than 10,000 students.

==== New degree programs and the Science Academy ====
Varshney founded the Science Academy, a professional graduate unit within the college, in 2019. Its first programs, a master's and a graduate certificate in data science and a master's in applied machine learning (with the Clark School of Engineering), began in November 2019; master's programs in bioinformatics and computational biology and in quantum computing (with Engineering, and with a graduate certificate) followed, and a master's in artificial intelligence, run with the Artificial Intelligence Interdisciplinary Institute at Maryland, began in fall 2025. Under his deanship the college launched undergraduate majors in Immersive Media Design (with the College of Arts and Humanities) and Neuroscience (with the College of Behavioral and Social Sciences), both in 2020; a climate-finance partnership with the Smith School of Business; a B.S.–M.D. program with the Clark School and the University of Maryland School of Medicine (2025), supported by a $12.75 million MPower grant; and a B.S. in Artificial Intelligence, developed with the Artificial Intelligence Interdisciplinary Institute at Maryland and approved in 2026 for a fall 2027 launch alongside a companion B.A. in Human-Centered AI in the College of Arts and Humanities. The college also started a pilot with Prince George's County Public Schools to teach Calculus I to high school students, with the College of Education.

==== Research institutes and federal partnerships ====
The college launched or co-launched the Brain and Behavior Institute (2018), the Quantum Technology Center (2019, with Engineering), the Center for Machine Learning (2019, with Capital One support), the Brin Mathematics Research Center (2021), the Institute for Health Computing (2023, with the University of Maryland, Baltimore and the University of Maryland Medical System), and the Artificial Intelligence Interdisciplinary Institute at Maryland (AIM, 2024), which is administratively housed in the college under his leadership with Hal Daumé III as inaugural director. Between 2018 and 2023, the college secured more than $630 million in federal cooperative agreements with NASA, NIST, the National Cancer Institute, and NOAA, followed in July 2024 by NOAA's five-year, $388 million renewal of the UMD-led Cooperative Institute for Satellite Earth System Studies, and annual sponsored research funding rose from more than $175 million to more than $250 million.

==== Faculty, philanthropy and facilities ====
In his first term the college raised more than $116 million, created or filled 20 endowed faculty positions, and hired 84 faculty members. Gifts included $4.75 million from Michael and Eugenia Brin and the Sergey Brin Family Foundation to establish the Brin Mathematics Research Center in December 2021, followed in March 2024 by a further $27.2 million from the Brins to endow the center, create a Brin Endowed Chair in Mathematics, and fund a summer mathematics camp for Maryland high-school students. The Brendan Iribe Center for Computer Science and Engineering (215,600 square feet, $152 million), named for the Oculus co-founder Brendan Iribe, opened in April 2019, and a new Chemistry Building wing (105,000 square feet, $132 million) was dedicated in April 2024.

=== Interim Vice President for Research (2016–2017 and 2021–2022) ===
Varshney served twice as the university's interim vice president for research, both times while holding another post.

==== First term (October 2016 – September 2017) ====
He was appointed effective October 3, 2016, succeeding Patrick O'Shea, who left to become president of University College Cork, and led a research enterprise then valued at $560 million a year. He was succeeded by Laurie Locascio in late 2017. During the term the university adopted a rewritten intellectual-property policy, approved by the University System of Maryland Board of Regents on November 9, 2017, that shortened the policy and increased the share of licensing revenue returned to inventors; signed two NASA cooperative agreements, CRESST II ($87.5 million, later extended at $178 million) and ESSIC ($64.8 million); hired Julie Lenzer, formerly of the U.S. Economic Development Administration, as associate vice president for economic development; and completed reaccreditation of the campus animal care and use program by AAALAC International. He was part of the team that won a $500,000 U.S. Economic Development Administration grant in September 2017 to launch the Mixed/Augmented/Virtual Reality Innovation Center (MAVRIC), and co-led the Maryland Blended Reality Center, one of the MPower signature projects announced in October 2017.

==== Second term (October 2021 – January 2022) ====
He was appointed effective October 11, 2021, for the joint College Park and Baltimore research enterprise, succeeding Laurie Locascio on her nomination to lead NIST. He was succeeded by Gregory Ball on February 1, 2022. During the term the university named its eight inaugural MPower Professors; secured an MPower grant and cooperative agreement giving College Park faculty access to the Baltimore campus's Institute for Clinical and Translational Research; and named Dean Chang interim chief innovation officer. In November 2021, he joined the steering committee of the XR Association's Future of XR Advisory Council as the university's representative.

== Research ==
Varshney's research spans interactive computer graphics, scientific visualization, and immersive systems. His group's work falls into five threads.

=== Level of detail and multi-resolution graphics ===
With Fred Brooks and colleagues at UNC, Varshney developed simplification envelopes (SIGGRAPH 1996), a polygon-simplification method that bounds geometric error and preserves topology. At Stony Brook he introduced dynamic view-dependent simplification and, with Francine Evans and Steven Skiena, algorithms for generating efficient triangle strips released as the STRIPE tool. He is a co-author of Level of Detail for 3D Graphics (Morgan Kaufmann, 2002).

=== Molecular surfaces and scientific visualization ===
His doctoral work with Brooks produced a fast analytical algorithm for smooth molecular surfaces, distributed as the SURF program. The surface representation later underpinned a method for predicting rotational diffusion tensors of proteins from NMR data. In 2004, he received the IEEE Visualization Technical Achievement Award, in its inaugural year, for this work.

=== Mesh saliency and perceptual graphics ===
With Chang Ha Lee and David Jacobs, Varshney introduced mesh saliency (SIGGRAPH 2005), a computational measure of visual importance over 3D surface geometry, later validated against human eye fixations. His group's saliency-guided visualization work received the IEEE Visualization Best Paper Award in 2012 for hierarchical exploration of volume data and the IEEE SciVis Best Paper Award in 2014 for visualization of brain microstructure in mild traumatic brain injury.

=== Foveated rendering, nanophotonic displays and light-field representations ===
At the Augmentarium, the visual-computing and VR/AR laboratory he founded at UMIACS in 2014 with a National Science Foundation Major Research Instrumentation award, Varshney's group developed kernel foveated rendering, eye-dominance-guided foveated rendering, and a log-rectilinear transformation for foveated 360-degree video streaming. With Mario Dagenais and Martin Peckerar, he leads an NSF-funded program on nanophotonic phased arrays for holographic and multifocal near-eye displays, which produced a U.S. patent for a nanophotonic phased-array display system in 2025. More recently, his group has worked on neural representations of light fields, including progressive multi-scale light field networks that stream and render at multiple levels of detail.

=== Virtual reality for memory, pain and medical training ===
A 2018 study with Eric Krokos and Catherine Plaisant found that people recall information better in a head-tracked virtual memory palace than on a desktop display. With Luana Colloca and Sarah Murthi of the University of Maryland School of Medicine, he has studied virtual reality as a non-pharmacological intervention for pain, in work published in PAIN, The Lancet Regional Health–Americas, and npj Digital Medicine; National Geographic profiled the collaboration in a 2020 feature on pain research. His group built HoloCamera, a volumetric capture system for cinematic-quality VR, and showed that VR fasciotomy training can match cadaveric training for medical students. Earlier work with trauma surgeons at the University of Maryland School of Medicine on augmented-reality guidance for procedures such as ultrasound-guided needle placement was reported by NBC News, and Varshney and Murthi described the approach in Harvard Business Review. Since 2022, he has been lead-site principal investigator of the NSF Industry–University Cooperative Research Center for Medical Innovations in Extended Reality (MIXR), established with $5 million in NSF funding, with the University of Maryland, Baltimore and the University of Michigan as partner sites.

== Awards and Honors ==
Varshney received a National Science Foundation CAREER Award in 1995, the foundation's award for early-career faculty. In 2004, he was the first recipient of the IEEE Visualization Technical Achievement Award, given by the IEEE Visualization and Graphics Technical Committee for a sustained technical contribution to visualization; the award recognized his work on the visualization of molecular surfaces. He was elected a Fellow of the IEEE in 2010 "for contributions to scientific visualization and computer graphics"; IEEE limits the number of Fellows named each year to one-tenth of one percent of its voting membership. In 2012, the IEEE Computer Society gave him its Meritorious Service Award and its Golden Core Award, which recognizes long-standing service to the society. In 2018, the University of Maryland named an augmented-reality-enabled catheter, developed by Varshney with Sarah Murthi, Gary Schwartzbauer and Xuetong Sun, its Invention of the Year in the information sciences category. In 2019, he was elected to the inaugural class of the IEEE Visualization Academy, which recognizes lasting contributions to the field.[8] His papers have received best-paper awards at IEEE Visualization (2012, for hierarchical exploration of volume data with Cheuk Yiu Ip and Joseph JaJa), IEEE SciVis (2014, for visualization of brain microstructure), the ASME Computers and Information in Engineering Conference (2012, with Satyandra K. Gupta, for GPU prediction of optical forces on microsphere ensembles), ACM Web3D (2016, for Social Street View with Ruofei Du), and the journal Computers & Graphics (2007, for a fast all-nearest-neighbor algorithm for large point clouds, with Jagan Sankaranarayanan and Hanan Samet).

== Professional Service and Public Engagement ==
Varshney was papers chair of IEEE Visualization in 2000 and 2001, program chair in 2005, and conference chair in 2006 and 2007. He was general chair of the IEEE Visualization and Graphics Technical Committee from 2008 to 2011 and associate editor-in-chief of IEEE Transactions on Visualization and Computer Graphics from 2014 to 2015. He chaired the ACM Symposium on Interactive 3D Graphics and Games in 2010.

In March 2016, as UMIACS director and co-director of the Center for Health-related Informatics and Bioimaging, Varshney testified before the Maryland Senate Budget and Taxation Committee and the House Appropriations Committee in support of the University of Maryland Strategic Partnership Act of 2016 (SB 1052 and HB 1607), which placed the College Park–Baltimore MPower partnership in statute and created the University of Maryland Center for Economic and Entrepreneurship Development to develop programs in virtual reality, data analytics, biomedical devices, neurosciences and cybersecurity. He described College Park–Baltimore collaborations on virtual and augmented reality tools for surgery and on data-driven approaches to Parkinson's disease and traumatic brain injury as the kind of work the partnership would expand. The act became law in April 2016. In February 2022, he was one of twenty university researchers in graphics, optics and virtual reality who signed a letter, organized by the XR Association, urging House leaders to adopt an amendment adding immersive technologies to the key technology focus areas of the America COMPETES Act of 2022; the amendment was adopted when the House passed the bill on February 4, 2022. In August 2023, he and the XR Association hosted Representative Glenn Ivey, together with members of the Maryland Higher Education Commission and officials from the U.S. Department of Commerce, for a tour of the HoloCamera facility and demonstrations of the university's virtual-reality surgical-training and conflict-resolution work. In January and February 2024, he testified before the same two committees in support of SB 376 and HB 334, which established permanent state funding for the University of Maryland Institute for Health Computing. The legislation passed both chambers and was signed into law by Governor Wes Moore in April 2024.
