= Under Secretary of Commerce for Standards and Technology =

Official in the US Department of Commerce

United States Under Secretary of Commerce for Standards and Technology
- Seal of the U.S. Department of Commerce

- Flag of an under secretary of commerce

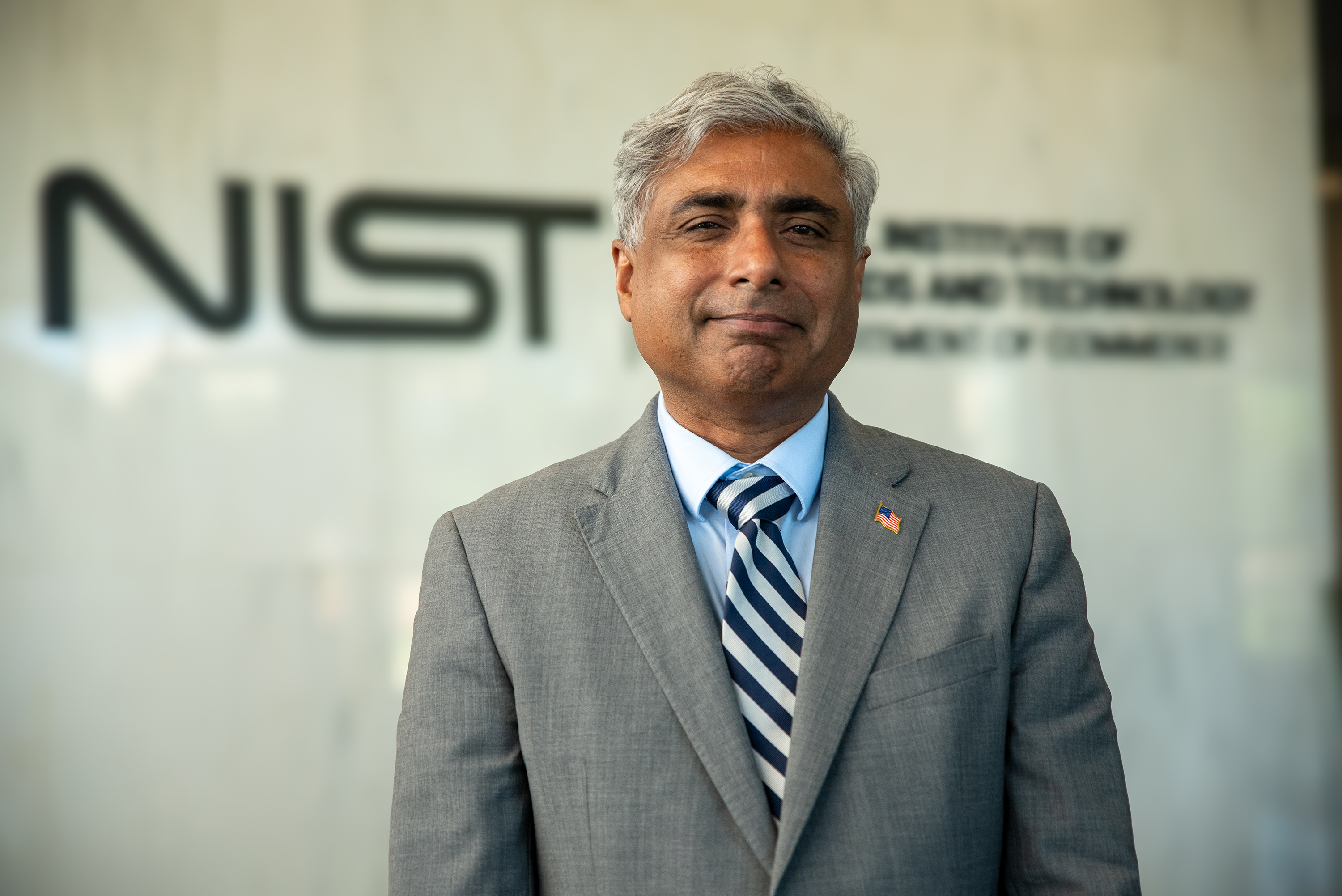
- Incumbent; Arvind Raman since June 30, 2026
- Appointer: The president; with Senate advice and consent
- Formation: January 4, 2011
- First holder: Patrick D. Gallagher
- Website: Official website

The under secretary of commerce for standards and technology, or USC(ST), is a high-ranking official in the United States Department of Commerce and the principal advisor to the United States secretary of commerce on the technological development. The under secretary is dual hatted as the Director of the National Institute of Standards and Technology within the Commerce Department.

The under secretary is appointed by the president of the United States with the consent of the United States Senate to serve at the pleasure of the president. The current under secretary is Arvind Raman, who was appointed by President Donald Trump and assumed office on June 1, 2026. Locascio is a biomedical researcher, former National Institute of Standards and Technology (NIST) official, and current vice president for research at two University of Maryland locations.

== Overview ==
As the director of NIST, the under secretary is responsible for promoting American innovation and industrial competitiveness by advancing measurement science, standards, and technology in ways that enhance economic security and improve our quality of life.

With the rank of under secretary, the USC(ST)/Director is a Level III position within the Executive Schedule. The under secretary ranks sixth in the line of succession for the office of Secretary of Commerce.

== History ==
The position of under secretary/director was created by the America COMPETES Reauthorization Act of 2010, which was signed into law by President Barack Obama in 2010.

In the Electronic Commerce Technology Promotion Act, the 106th Congress created a position for Under Secretary of Commerce for Technology, appointing Dr Cheryl L. Shavers to the position.

== Reporting officials ==
NIST officials reporting to the USC(ST)/Director include:

- Associate Director for Laboratory Program/Principal Deputy
- Associate Director for Innovation and Industry Services
- Associate Director for Management Resources

== Officeholders ==
Denotes an acting under secretary of commerce for standards and technology

| No. | Portrait | Name | Took office | Left office | Tenure | President serving under |
|---|---|---|---|---|---|---|
| 1 | Patrick D. Gallagher | Patrick D. Gallagher | January 4, 2011 | June 19, 2014 | 3 years, 166 days | Barack Obama |
| 2 | Willie E. May | Willie E. May | May 5, 2015 | January 3, 2017 | 1 year, 243 days | Barack Obama |
| - | Kent Rochford | Kent Rochford | January 4, 2017 | January 20, 2017 | 16 days | Barack Obama |
| - | Kent Rochford | Kent Rochford | January 20, 2017 | October 15, 2017 | 268 days (284 days total) | Donald Trump |
| 3 | Walter Copan | Walter Copan | October 16, 2017 | January 20, 2021 | 3 years, 96 days | Donald Trump |
| - | James K. Olthoff | James K. Olthoff | January 20, 2021 | April 19, 2022 | 1 year, 89 days | Joe Biden |
| 4 | Laurie E. Locascio | Laurie E. Locascio | April 19, 2022 | December 31, 2024 | 2 years, 256 days | Joe Biden |
| - | | Charles H. Romine | January 1, 2025 | January 20, 2025 | 19 days | Joe Biden |
| - | | Craig Burkhardt | January 20, 2025 | June 29, 2026 | 1 year, 160 days | Donald Trump |
| 5 | | Arvind Raman | June 30, 2026 | Present | 126 days | Donald Trump |

== See also ==
- List of directors of the National Institute of Standards and Technology
