= Walter Copan =

American chemist and government official

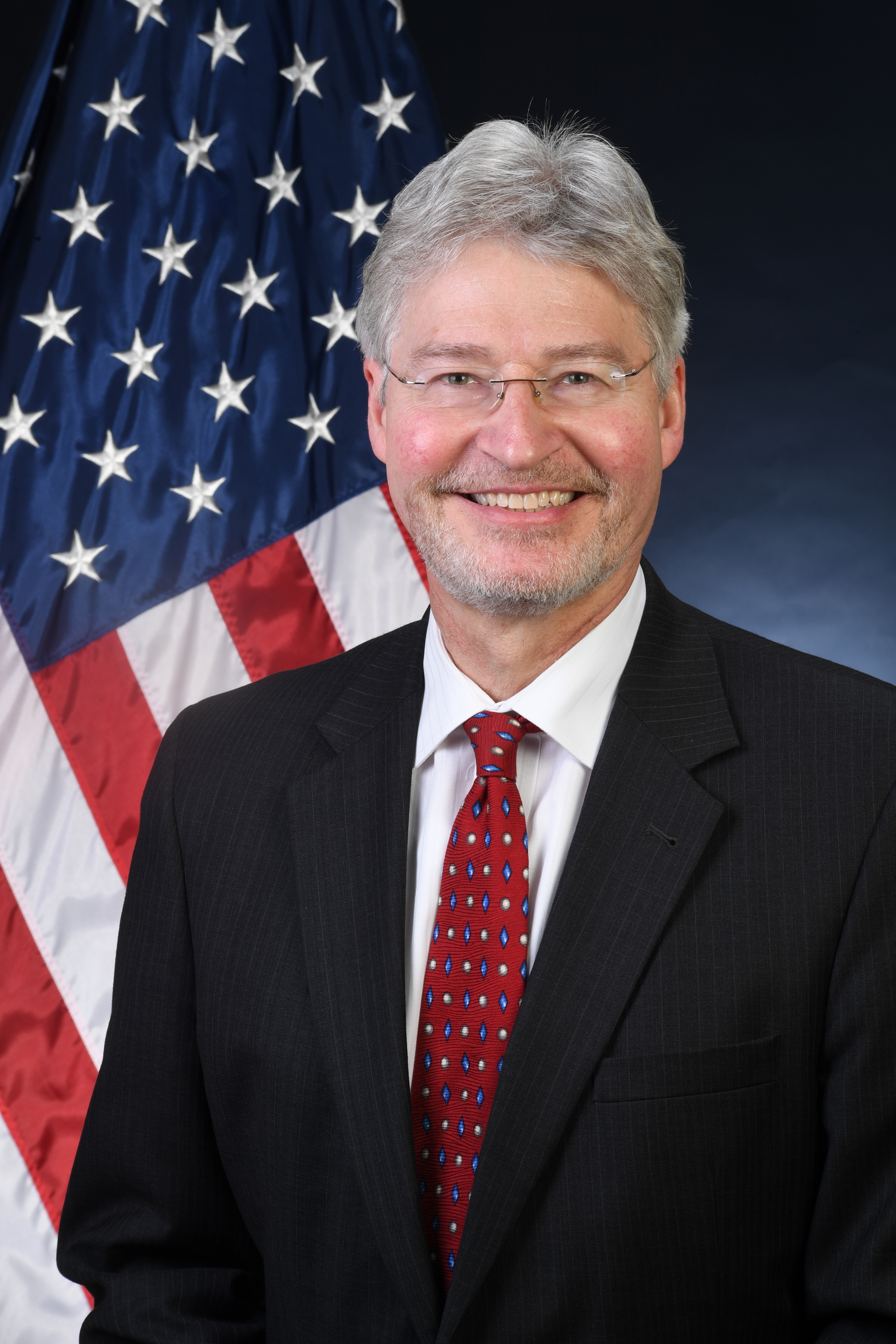
- Copan in 2015

Under Secretary of Commerce for Standards and Technology
- In office October 16, 2017 – January 20, 2021
- President: Donald Trump
- Preceded by: Willie E. May
- Succeeded by: Laurie E. Locascio

16th Director of the National Institute of Standards and Technology
- In office October 16, 2017 – January 20, 2021
- President: Donald Trump
- Preceded by: Kent Rochford (acting); Willie E. May
- Succeeded by: Laurie Locascio

Personal details
- Born: Walter George Copan
- Education: Case Western Reserve University (BA, PhD)
- Scientific career
- Fields: Physical chemistry
- Institutions: Lubrizol; National Renewable Energy Laboratory; Brookhaven National Laboratory; National Institute of Standards and Technology; Colorado School of Mines
- Thesis: Carbon-13 and Nitrogen-15 nuclear magnetic resonance studies of rhodopsin and bacteriorhodopsin (NMR) (1982)

Walter Copan is an American chemist and government official who served as the under secretary of commerce for standards and technology and the 16th Director of the National Institute of Standards and Technology from 2017 to 2021. Prior to assuming that role, he worked as president and CEO of IP Engineering Group Corporation and as a board member of Rocky Mountain Innovation Partners.

== Early life and education ==
Copan received a Bachelor of Arts degree in chemistry from Western Reserve College in 1975 and a Ph.D. in physical chemistry from Case Western Reserve University in 1982.

== Career ==
Copan previously served as managing director of technology commercialization and partnerships at Brookhaven National Laboratory and as technology transfer at the National Renewable Energy Laboratory. During his time at Brookhaven, he led a pilot program across the United States Department of Energy called Agreements for Commercializing Technology. The program was praised for making intellectual property agreements between businesses and government more flexible and for promoting an entrepreneurial culture. He led Clean Diesel Technologies onto NASDAQ while serving as CTO and executive vice president. Copan also had a 28-year career with Lubrizol, where he was active in research, development, and business unit management. At Lubrizol, Copan led the company's European research and development during the late 1980s and early 1990s, including working with countries that had recently broken away from the Soviet Union.

=== Under secretary of commerce for standards and technology ===
In September 2017, Copan was nominated by President Donald Trump to become under secretary of commerce for standards and technology. Copan's nomination was supported by the University Corporation for Atmospheric Research. He was confirmed unanimously by the United States Senate in October 2017.

At that time, Copan said his top priority in the role would be to implement the Cybersecurity Framework, a National Institute of Standards and Technology effort to improve network security across federal agencies and industry.

=== Post-government career ===
As a political appointee, he left office on January 20, 2021. In July 2021, Copan joined Colorado School of Mines as the Vice President of Research and Technology Transfer. In 2022, Copan contributed to a letter to the United States Department of Justice signed by former federal officials of both parties that criticized the Biden administration's proposed policy changes for standard-essential patents.

In January 2026, Copan announced he is stepping down from his position with the Colorado School of Mines at the end of February, becoming an emeritus advisor.

Government offices
Preceded by Kent Rochford (acting); Willie E. May	16th Director of the National Institute of Standards and Technology; 2017 – 2021	Succeeded by James K. Olthoff (acting); Laurie Locascio
