= Arden L. Bement Jr. =

American engineer and scientist (born 1932)

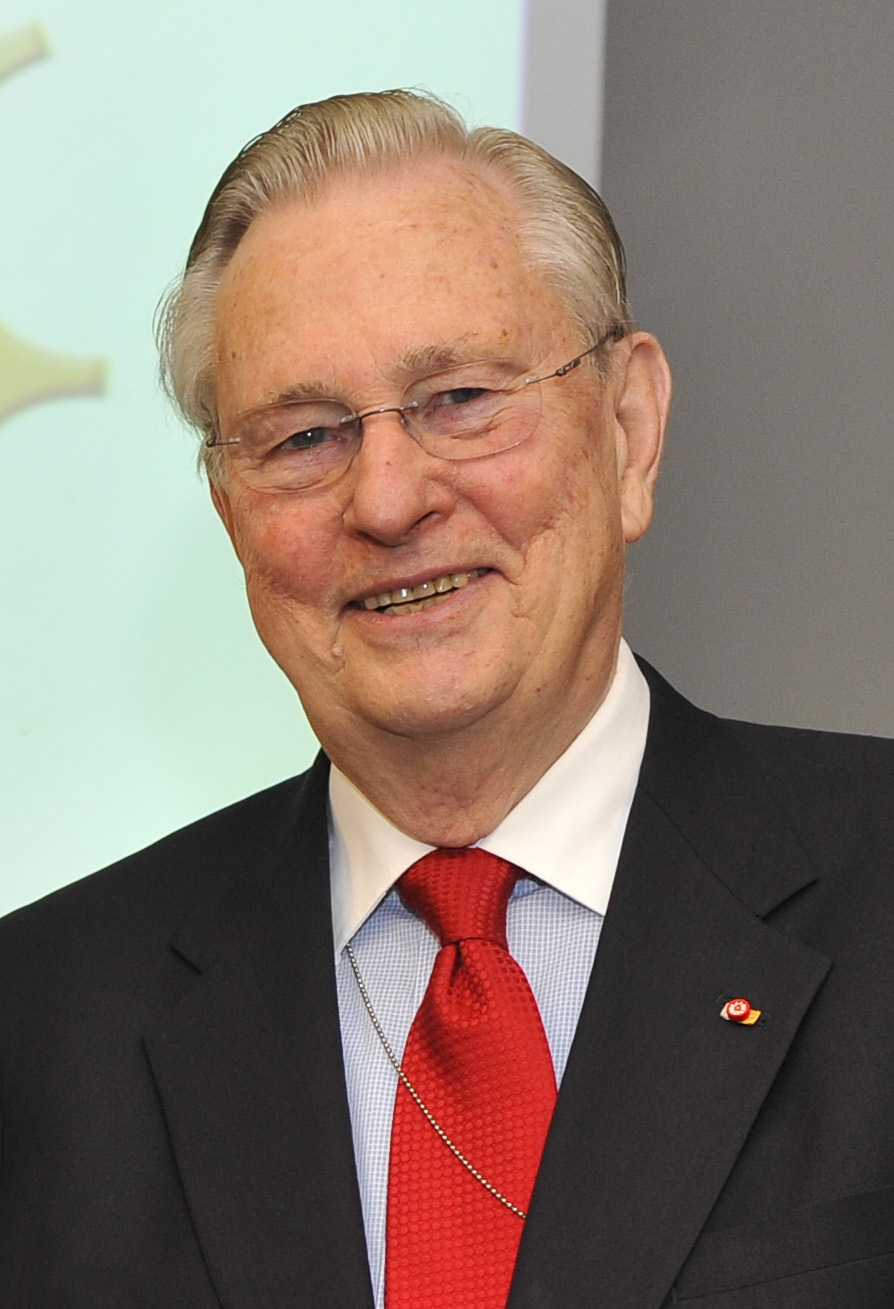
- Bement in 2010

12th Director of the National Science Foundation
- In office 2004–2010
- President: George W. Bush; Barack Obama
- Preceded by: Rita R. Colwell
- Succeeded by: Subra Suresh

12th Director of the National Institute of Standards and Technology
- In office 2001–2004
- President: George W. Bush
- Preceded by: Karen Brown (acting)
- Succeeded by: Hratch Semerjian (acting)

Personal details
- Born: May 22, 1932 (age 94) Pittsburgh, Pennsylvania, U.S.
- Scientific career
- Education: Colorado School of Mines; University of Idaho; University of Michigan
- Fields: Material Science and Engineering, Nuclear Engineering
- Workplaces: General Electric Company, Battelle Memorial Institute, MIT, DARPA, Office of the Secretary of Defense, TRW, Purdue University, National Science Foundation, National Institute of Standards and Technology
- Thesis: Effects of cold work and neutron irradiation on the tensile properties of zircaloy-2 (1963)

Arden Lee Bement Jr. (born May 22, 1932) is an American engineer and scientist and has served in executive positions in government, industry and academia.

Bement was elected a member of the National Academy of Engineering in 1983 for contributions to the understanding of irradiation effects in nuclear materials and development of advanced materials concepts for defense applications.

He is a former Deputy Undersecretary of Defense for Research and Advanced Technology, Chief Technical Officer of TRW, Director of the National Science Foundation (NSF) and Director of the National Institute of Standards and Technology (NIST). Following the end of his six-year term at NSF, on June 1, 2010, he became the founding director of the Global Policy Research Institute and Chief Global Affairs officer at Purdue University.

== Biography ==
Born in Pittsburgh, Pennsylvania, Bement started his career at Climax Molybdenum Mine after graduating from high school. His supervisor, Prentice Cain, was a graduate of the Colorado School of Mines. He encouraged Arden to go to Mines, in fact, he helped Arden fill out the admission form, and then made a life-changing covenant. He agreed to put up the first semester's tuition and if Arden made it beyond the first semester, he wouldn't owe him a dime. Unfortunately, Prentice Cain died before he could see Arden graduate but his unselfish contribution forever changed the career path and subsequent Science and Engineering contributions from Dr. Arden Bement.

Dr. Bement holds an engineer of metallurgy degree from the Colorado School of Mines, a master's degree in metallurgical engineering from the University of Idaho, a doctorate in metallurgical engineering from the University of Michigan, and honorary doctorates from Cleveland State University, Case Western Reserve University, Colorado School of Mines, Korean Advanced Institute of Science and Technology, University of Idaho, University of Macau, and the Michigan Technological University. He is a member of the National Academy of Engineering, a fellow of the American Academy of Arts and Sciences and a fellow of the American Association for the Advancement of Science. Bement is also a retired lieutenant colonel of the United States Army Corps of Engineers.

Bement speaking at Penn State in 2005

Dr. Bement served as a member of the U.S. National Commission for UNESCO and as the vice-chair of the Commission's Natural Sciences and Engineering Committee. He has served on and has chaired numerous NRC studies, most relevant to this study chairing the Committee on the Scientific and Technical Assessment of Stockpile Stewardship. He has served as the head of the NIST Visiting Committee on Advanced Technology, head of the advisory committee for NIST's Advanced Technology Program and as a member of the board of overseers for the Malcolm Baldrige National Quality Award. He chaired the Commission for Engineering and Technical Studies and the National Materials Advisory Board of the National Research Council, was a member of the Space Station Utilization Advisory Subcommittee and the Commercialization and Technology Advisory Committee for NASA and was a member of the U.S. National Science Board from 1989–1995, which guides NSF activities and serves as a policy advisory body to the President and Congress.

Dr. Bement has been a director of Keithley Instruments Inc., Lord Corporation, Midwest Superconductivity Consortium and the Consortium for the Intelligent Management of the Electrical Power Grid and as a member of the Science and Technology Advisory Committee, Howmet Corporation, a division of Alcoa. He has been an advisor for The Electric Power Research Institute, the Department of Energy's Argonne National Laboratory, Oak Ridge National Laboratory, Lawrence Livermore National Laboratory, Los Alamos National Laboratory, Sandia National Laboratory, and the Idaho National Engineering and Environmental Laboratory. He is currently serving on the Science Advisory Council of the Skolkovo Foundation, the Board of Trustees of the Skolkovo Institute of Science and Technology, the Board of Visitors of the National Intelligence University, the Board of Trustees of Radian Research Inc., and President of the Indiana Academy of Science.

- 1954–1965, General Electric Company: Sr. Research Associate
- 1965–1970, Battelle Northwest Laboratories: Manager of Fuels, Materials, Metallurgy
- 1970–1976, Massachusetts Institute of Technology: Professor of Nuclear Materials
- 1976–1979, Defense Advanced Research Projects Agency: Director, Office of Materials Science
- 1979–1980, United States Department of Defense: Deputy Undersecretary for Research and Engineering
- 1980–1992, TRW: Vice President of Technical Resources and of Science and Technology
- 1992–2001, Purdue University: Distinguished Professor of Nuclear Engineering, Materials, Electrical, Computer Engineering
- 1992–2001, Purdue University: Head of the Schools of Nuclear Engineering, Appointment to Krannert School of Management
- 2001–2004, NIST: Director of the National Institute of Standards and Acting Director of NSF from February–November 2004
- 2004–2010, NSF: Director of the National Science Foundation
- 2010–2012, Purdue University: Inaugural Director of Purdue University's Global Policy Research Institute
- 2010–2012, Purdue University: Chief Global Affairs Officer for Purdue University
- 2012– Purdue University: Professor Emeritus and Adjunct Professor, Department of Technology Leadership and Innovation, College of Technology

== Awards and honors ==
- Distinguished Service Medal of the Department of Defense (1980)
- Member of the National Academy of Engineering (1983)
- Member of the Cosmos Club (1980)
- Distinguished Achievement Award from the Colorado School of Mines (1984)
- Fellow of the American Academy of Arts and Sciences (2004)
- Order of the Rising Sun, Gold and Silver Star awarded by the Emperor of Japan (2009)
- Navigator Award awarded by Potomac Institute for Policy Study (2010)
- Legion of Honor with the rank of Chevalier from the French Republic (2011)
- Chinese Academy of Sciences Graduate School Honorary Professorship (2011)

== See also ==
- List of directors of the National Institute of Standards and Technology

Government offices
| Preceded by Rita R. Colwell | 12th Director of the National Science Foundation; 2004 - May 2010 | Succeeded by Subra Suresh |
| Preceded by Raymond G. Kammer | 12th Director of the National Institute of Standards and Technology; 2001 - 2004 | Succeeded by William A. Jeffrey |
