= Laurie E. Locascio =

American biomedical engineer (born 1961)

Laurie Locascio
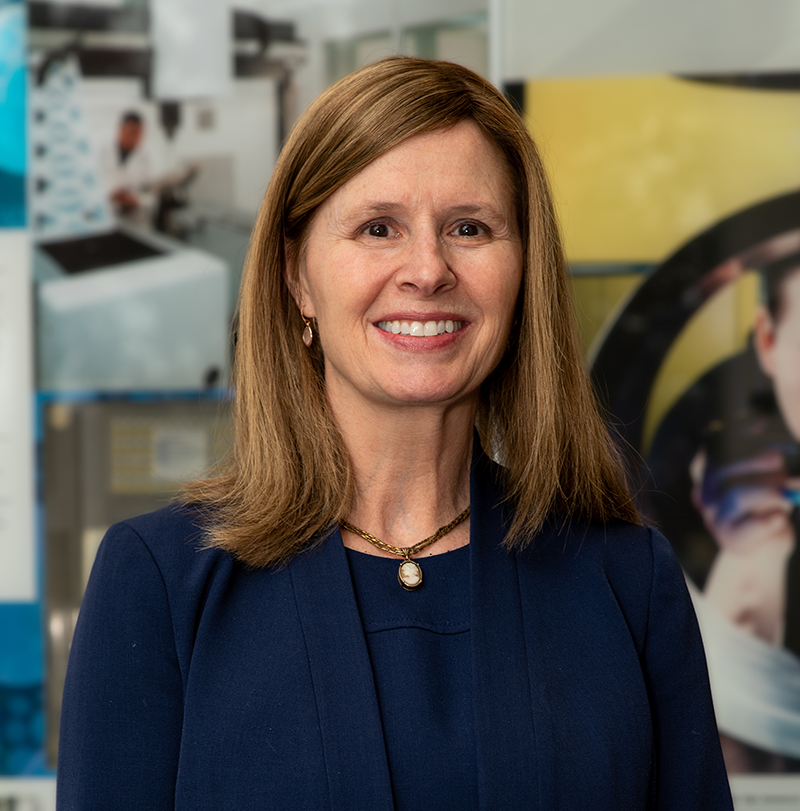

Under Secretary of Commerce for Standards and Technology 17th Director of the National Institute of Standards and Technology
- In office April 19, 2022 – December 31, 2024
- President: Joe Biden
- Preceded by: Walter Copan; James K. Olthoff (acting)
- Succeeded by: Charles H. Romine (acting)

Personal details
- Born: Laurie Ellen Locascio; November 21, 1961 (age 64) Cumberland, Maryland, U.S.
- Education: James Madison University (BS); University of Utah (MS); University of Maryland, Baltimore (PhD)
- Awards: Department of Commerce Silver Medal
- Scientific career
- Fields: Biomedical engineering Analytical chemistry
- Institutions: American National Standards Institute; National Institute of Standards and Technology; University of Maryland, Baltimore
- Thesis: Miniaturization of Bioassays for Analytical Toxicology (1999)
- Doctoral advisor: Cheng Lee

Laurie Ellen Locascio (born November 21, 1961) is an American biomedical engineer, analytical chemist, and president and CEO of the American National Standards Institute (ANSI). She was formerly the under secretary of commerce for standards and technology and the 17th director of National Institute of Standards and Technology from 2022 to 2024. From 2017 to 2021, Locascio was vice president for research of University of Maryland, College Park, and University of Maryland, Baltimore.

== Early life ==
Locascio was born November 21, 1961, in Cumberland, Maryland. Her father was a physicist at the Allegany Ballistics Laboratory. He fostered her interest in science. She attended Bishop Walsh High School. In 1977, she was awarded an educational development certificate. Locascio had an early interest in biology and won her school's senior science award. She graduated in 1979.

=== Education and early career ===
Locascio attended James Madison University from 1979 to 1983 where she earned her B.Sc. in chemistry with a minor in biochemistry. In 1982, Locascio was a research assistant in the department of chemistry at West Virginia University. She attended the University of Utah from 1983 to 1986 while working as a research assistant in the department of bioengineering. Locascio completed her M.Sc. in bioengineering in 1986.

From 1986 to 1999, Locascio was a research biomedical engineer in the molecular spectroscopy and microfluidic methods group in the analytical chemistry division of the National Institute of Standards and Technology (NIST). She received a certificate of recognition from the United States Department of Commerce in 1987, 1989, and 1990. Locascio was awarded the Department of Commerce Bronze Medal in 1991. While working at NIST, she was encouraged by her manager Willie E. May and mentor Richard Durst to pursue a doctoral degree. From 1995 to 1999, Locascio completed a Ph.D. in toxicology at the University of Maryland School of Medicine. At the University of Maryland, Katherine S. Squibb and Bruce O. Fowler, the director of the toxicology program, supported Locascio's efforts to attend graduate school while also working at NIST. Her dissertation was titled Miniaturization of bioassays for analytical toxicology. Cheng S. Lee was her doctoral advisor and Mohyee E. Eldefrawi served on her advisory committee.

== Career ==
Locascio is an interdisciplinary researcher. She worked at NIST for 31 years, rising from a research biomedical engineer to eventually leading the agency's material measurement laboratory. Locascio also served as the acting associate director for laboratory programs, the number two position at NIST, providing direction and operational guidance for NIST's lab research programs across two campuses in Gaithersburg, Maryland, and Boulder, Colorado. She received the 2017 American Chemical Society Earle B. Barnes Award for Leadership in Chemical Research Management, and the 2017 Washington Academy of Sciences Special Award in Scientific Leadership. Locascio has published 115 scientific papers and has received 12 patents in the fields of bioengineering and analytical chemistry. During her time at NIST, she received the Department of Commerce Silver Medal, American Chemical Society Division of Analytical Chemistry Arthur F. Findeis Award, the NIST Safety Award and the NIST Applied Research Award. Locascio is also a fellow of the American Chemical Society and the American Institute for Medical and Biological Engineering.

In late 2017, Locascio joined University of Maryland's faculty. She was the first person to serve as the vice president for research of both the College Park and Baltimore campuses. In this role, Locascio oversaw the University of Maryland's research and innovation enterprise at these two campuses, which garner a combined $1.1 billion in external research funding each year. Within Locascio's purview was the development of large interdisciplinary research programs, technology commercialization, innovation and economic development efforts, and strategic partnerships with industry, federal, academic, and nonprofit collaborators. She also served as a professor in the Fischell Department of Bioengineering at the A. James Clark School of Engineering with a secondary appointment in the department of pharmacology in the School of Medicine. In 2021, Locascio inducted as a fellow of the National Academy of Inventors. At the University of Maryland that same year, she was succeeded by interim vice president Amitabh Varshney.

On July 16, 2021, President Joe Biden nominated Locascio as the under secretary of commerce for standards and technology. She was confirmed by the Senate on April 7, 2022. On April 19, 2022, Locascio was sworn in by U.S. secretary of commerce Gina Raimondo. She was the fourth Under Secretary of Commerce for Standards and Technology and 17th director of NIST. Locascio was the third female head of NIST. She resigned her governmental positions on December 31, 2024.

In January 2025, she assumed the role of president and CEO of the American National Standards Institute (ANSI).
