= Cheryl L. Shavers =

American chemist

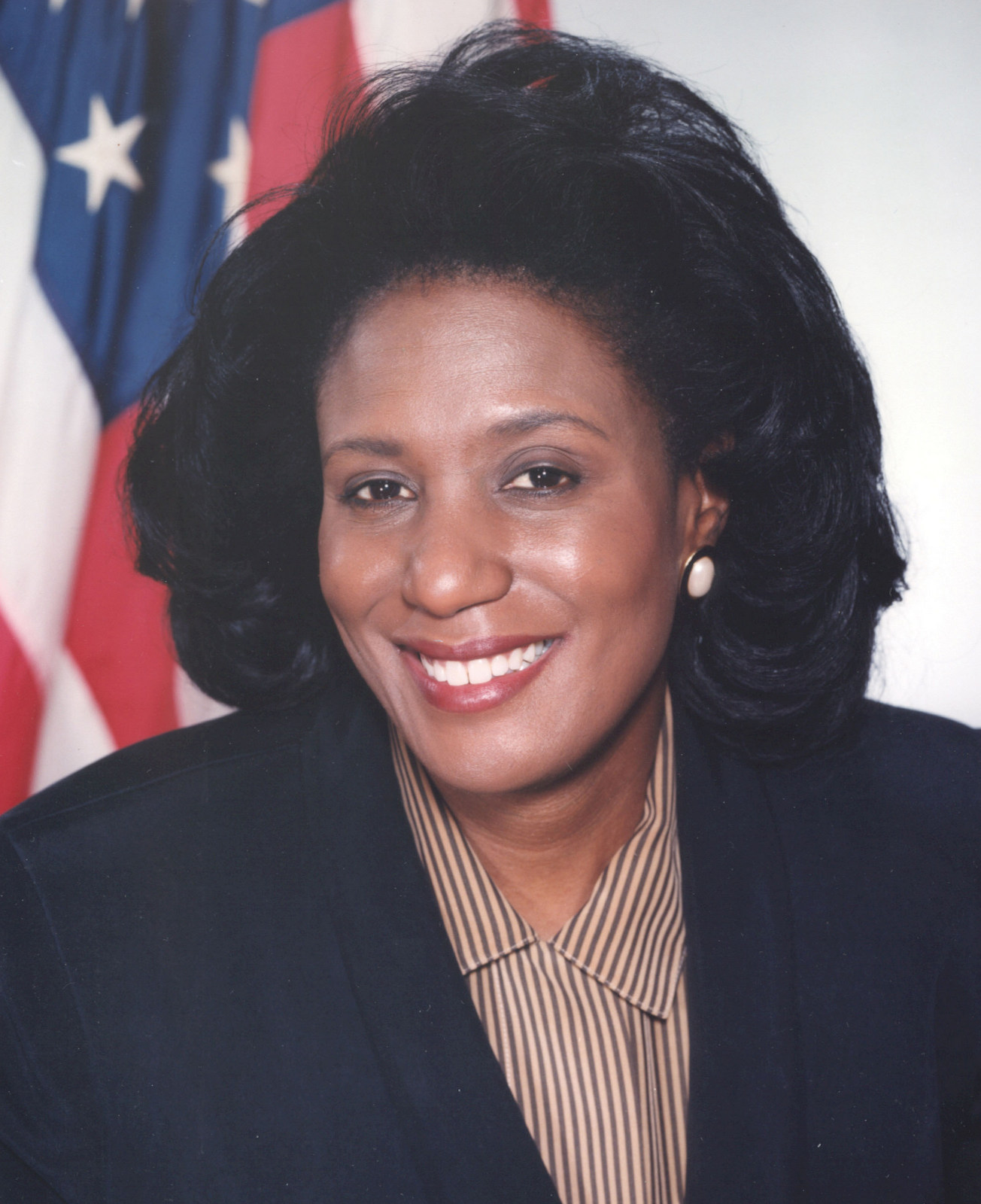
- Cheryl L. Shavers, Under Secretary of Commerce for Technology (1999–2001)
- Born: Cheryl Lynn Shavers; December 26, 1953 (age 72); San Marcos, Texas
- Education: Arizona State University (ASU)
- Known for: Under Secretary of Commerce for Technology, 1999–2001 (appointed by William Clinton); Work on semiconductors
- Awards: Women in Technology International Hall of Fame; ASU College of Liberal Arts and Sciences Hall of Fame
- Scientific career
- Fields: Chemistry; Engineering
- Workplaces: Phoenix Police Department; Motorola; Arizona State University; Hewlett Packard; Wiltron; Varian Associates; Intel Corporation; US government service; Global Smarts Inc (2001-)

Cheryl L. Shavers (born December 26, 1953, San Marcos, Texas) is an American chemist, engineer, and businesswoman. After gaining a degree in chemistry, she worked as an engineer at Motorola. Shavers returned to university for a few years, gaining a PhD in solid state chemistry, before returning to private industry. Shavers worked at increasingly senior levels in Silicon Valley, at Hewlett Packard and Intel. She served as Under Secretary of Commerce for Technology in the Clinton Administration (1999–2001), and is a registered patent agent in the US Patent and Trademark Office. After leaving government service in 2001, she established a consultancy and strategy business, Global Smarts Inc. Shavers was inducted into the Women In Technology International (WITI) Hall of Fame and the Hall of Fame of the Arizona State University's College of Liberal Arts and Sciences.

== Early life and education ==
Shavers' mother, Erna Mae Caldwell, was a maid, who brought her and her sister up alone in South Phoenix in financial hardship. She attended South Mountain High School. When she was a young teenager, a sex worker in her neighborhood was murdered. Watching the police investigators at the scene gave her the ambition of working in forensic science, which required a chemistry degree.

Shavers was awarded a scholarship to Mesa Community College, and gained a chemistry (Associate Arts) degree. She transferred to the Bachelor of Science program at the Arizona State University, majoring in chemistry and paying for tuition by working at night in a data processing center. Shavers successfully applied for an internship in the Phoenix Police Department's crime lab, working with a team developing a method for separating enzymes trace materials (enzyme typing). When the lab director reassigned her to menial tasks a few months short of completing her degree, she resigned in distress and changed career course. Shavers graduated in 1976. She has described an encounter as a graduate student with Nobel Laureate, Linus Pauling, at a conference" “He went over some of my work and it all became real". However, she has said she did not want an academic career: "That wasn't for me. I wanted to get going, get back to industry where I could make things happen."

== Career ==
In 1976, Shavers began working in Motorola's Semiconductor Sector in Phoenix. Motorola encouraged new graduates to undertake postgraduate studies, and she studied thermodynamics in ASU's chemistry department.

In 1978, she left Motorola for Arizona State University, returning to industry after gaining her PhD in solid state chemistry in 1981. Her dissertation was titled "Theoretical and experimental studies in crystal chemistry", and also published on oxides and nitrides.

Her next step was to Hewlett Packard in California, first as a semiconductor process development engineer. At Hewlett Packard, she moved to the Technical Legal Department, and became a patent agent in the US Patent and Trademark Office, and spent four years working towards a Juris Doctor degree at night. However, she found the work boring, and decided to go back to science and technology, taking an entry-level managerial position in the diode microelectronics lab at the Wilton company. When the company moved, she remained and worked in thin films applications research at Varian Associates.

Shavers was recruited by Intel and rose quickly in the corporation to senior management. She also had a weekly "Women in Technology" column for the San Jose Mercury News. In 1999, she was nominated by President Bill Clinton to serve as the Under Secretary of Commerce for Technology. In 2001, she left government service and formed a consultancy and strategy company, called Global Smarts. Shavers has also produced and hosted radio talk programs, and served on the board of directors of several technology companies.

== Government office ==
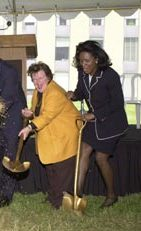
Senator Barbara Mikulski and Cheryl L Shavers, groundbreaking ceremony at NIST in 2000

Shavers was confirmed by the US Senate as Under Secretary of Commerce for Technology in 1999, serving till 2001.

The role of the Under Secretary included overseeing the Commerce Department's Technology Administration (TA) and the Office of Technology Policy (OTP), as well as the National Institute of Standards and Technology (NIST), the National Technical Information Service (NTIS) and the Office of Space Commercialization.

As well as providing advice and participating in policy development, she worked on encryption standards and digital signatures to support the development of web commerce during her tenure.

In her capacity as Under Secretary, Shavers also represented the Department of Commerce in a variety of science and technology forums, including serving as co-chair of the Technology Subcommittee under the U.S.-Egypt Partnership for Economic Growth.

== Honors ==
- Hall of Fame, Women in Technology International (1996)
- Hall of Fame, College of Liberal Arts and Sciences (1997)

== Personal life ==
Shavers is married to Joseph C Agu. She lives in Santa Clara, California, with her husband, daughter, and twin sons. In a 2000 interview with Ebony magazine, she said, "I have a 4-year-old daughter and I have a responsibility to children between her age and myself to ensure that the trail I'm blazing gets wider and wider".
