= Patrick D. Gallagher =

American physicist (born 1963)

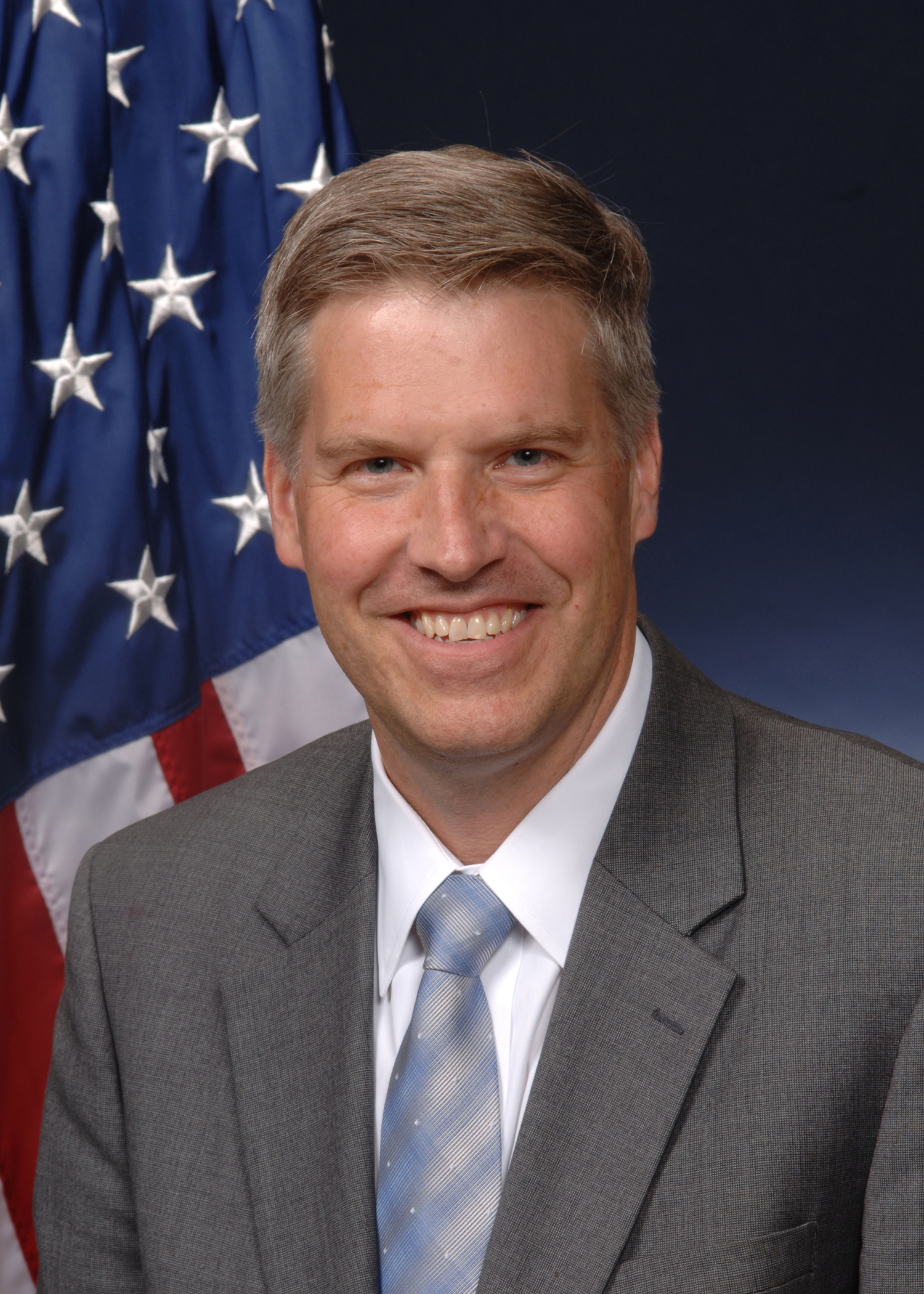
- Official portrait, 2013

18th Chancellor of the University of Pittsburgh
- In office August 1, 2014 – July 17, 2023
- Preceded by: Mark Nordenberg
- Succeeded by: Joan Gabel

Acting United States Deputy Secretary of Commerce
- In office June 1, 2013 – July 24, 2014
- President: Barack Obama
- Preceded by: Rebecca Blank
- Succeeded by: Bruce H. Andrews

14th Director of the National Institute of Standards and Technology
- In office November 5, 2009 – June 19, 2014
- President: Barack Obama
- Preceded by: William A. Jeffrey
- Succeeded by: Willie E. May

Personal details
- Born: March 29, 1963 (age 63) Albuquerque, New Mexico, U.S.
- Education: Benedictine College (BS); University of Pittsburgh (PhD)
- Scientific career
- Fields: Physics
- Workplaces: National Institute of Standards and Technology; University of Pittsburgh
- Thesis: The interaction of colloidal polystyrene latex spheres with a critical binary liquid mixture (1991)
- Doctoral advisor: James V. Maher

Patrick David Gallagher (born March 29, 1963) is an American physicist and former chancellor of the University of Pittsburgh. He previously served as acting United States deputy secretary of commerce from 2013 to 2014 and 14th director of the National Institute of Standards and Technology from 2009 and 2014.

Following his resignation from the chancellor position at Pitt in 2023, he joined the university's Department of Physics and Astronomy.

== Biography ==
Gallagher was born and raised in Albuquerque to Claire A. Gallagher (née Selter; born in Sunbury, PA to Agnes J. Selter (née Karb) and Adolf P. Selter) and John Gallagher (born in Ireland, having moved to Philadelphia at the age of 2). His father, worked at Sandia National Laboratories. During high school, the young Gallagher spent summers working on public health and sanitation projects in Mexico, Ecuador, and Honduras under sponsorship of Amigos de las Américas. He graduated from St. Pius High School.

Gallagher studied Physics and Philosophy at Benedictine College in Atchison, Kansas. After graduating in 1985, he taught math and science for a year at Bishop LeBlond High School in St. Joseph, Missouri, where he also served as head coach for the cross-country track team. Returning to graduate school, he received his Ph.D. in physics at the University of Pittsburgh in 1991, and did post-doctoral research at Boston University. He joined the NIST Center for Neutron Research as an instrumental scientist in 1993. His research interests have included neutron and X-ray instrumentation and studies of soft condensed matter systems such as liquids, polymers, and gels.

In 2000, Gallagher was selected as NIST agency representative at the National Science and Technology Council (NSTC). Then, starting in 2004, he served for four years as director of the NIST Center for Neutron Research (NCNR), a national user facility for neutron scattering on the NIST Gaithersburg campus. In 2008, he became deputy director of NIST.

Nominated by President Obama, Gallagher was confirmed as the 14th Director of NIST on November 5, 2009. He also served as Under Secretary of Commerce for Standards and Technology, a new position created in the America COMPETES Reauthorization Act of 2010, signed by President Obama on January 4, 2011.

Gallagher was the 18th Chancellor of the University of Pittsburgh, where he served from 2014 through 2023.

Gallagher has been active in the area of U.S. policy for scientific user facilities and was chair of the Interagency Working Group on neutron and light source facilities under the Office of Science and Technology Policy. Currently, he serves as co-chair of the Standards Subcommittee under the White House National Science and Technology Council.

Gallagher and his wife, Karen Jane (Abrahamson) Gallagher, an occupational therapist, have three sons, Sean, Devin, and Ryan.

== Honors ==
On June 23, 2023, the University of Pittsburgh announced that the plaza and walkway outside the 5th Avenue entrance of the William Pitt Union would be named in honor of Gallagher's service as chancellor of the university.

Government offices
Preceded by William A. Jeffrey	14th Director of the National Institute of Standards and Technology; 2009–2014	Succeeded by Willie E. May
Academic offices
Preceded by Mark Nordenberg	18th Chancellor of the University of Pittsburgh; 2014 – 2023	Succeeded by Joan Gabel
