= Clean Diesel Technologies =

American company

CDTI Advanced Materials, Inc.
- Formerly: Clean Diesel Technologies, Inc.
- Company type: Public
- Traded as: OTC Pink: CDTI (since 2018); Nasdaq: CDTI (1995-2018)
- Industry: Pollution Controls
- Founded: 1996; 30 years ago
- Headquarters: Oxnard, California
- Key people: Matthew Beale (CEO)
- Revenue: $52.48 million (As of 2013)
- Website: cdti.com

CDTI Advanced Materials, Inc. (formerly Clean Diesel Technologies, Inc.) is an American company that focuses on providing vehicle emissions control systems for heavy duty and light duty diesel pollution control. The company has two divisions, including Heavy Duty Diesel Systems division, which focusing on developing and producing exhaust emission control device, and Catalyst division engaged in developing catalyst applied for emission reduction. The company has two self-developed and patented intellectual properties including MPC, a catalyst manufacturing process, and Platinum Plus, a diesel soluble additive. Their products have received US Environmental Protection Agency ("EPA") verification and have been widely used in highway automobile engines.

== Background ==
CDTi was founded in 1996 and based in Ventura, California. Despite the core business in US, it also operates in Canada, France, Japan and Sweden. In September 2012, the company and its subsidiaries changed their names to CDTi and operates under this name. With the increasingly significant exhaust pollution control situation worldwide, the company provides devices for internal combustion engines. It generated a revenue of $60.5 million in 2012 with an increase of 40.5% in Catalyst division.

In December, 2013, Its product Purifilter(R)EGR and its off-road version Purifilter(R)OR, which were developed applying MPC technology to control exhaust emission, received the verification of US Environmental Protection Agency ("EPA"), which indicated that the product should be used in a majority of heavy highway engines in US.
