= Willie E. May =

American chemist and civil servant

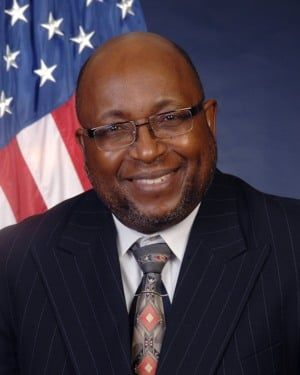
- May in 2015

Under Secretary of Commerce for Standards and Technology
- In office May 4, 2015 – January 3, 2017
- President: Barack Obama
- Preceded by: Patrick D. Gallagher
- Succeeded by: Walter Copan

15th Director of the National Institute of Standards and Technology
- In office May 4, 2015 – January 3, 2017
- President: Barack Obama
- Preceded by: Patrick D. Gallagher
- Succeeded by: Walter Copan

Personal details
- Born: Birmingham, Alabama, United States
- Education: Knoxville College (BS); University of Maryland (PhD)
- Awards: Department of Commerce Gold Medal; Department of Commerce Silver Medal; Department of Commerce Bronze Medal
- Scientific career
- Fields: Analytical chemistry
- Institutions: National Institute of Standards and Technology
- Thesis: The solubility behavior of polynuclear aromatic hydrocarbons in aqueous systems (1977)
- Doctoral advisor: David H. Freeman

Willie E. May is an American chemist who was the 15th director of the United States' National Institute of Standards and Technology (NIST) and the U.S. Under Secretary of Commerce for Standards and Technology. He has been active in international organizations, collaborating with others in Brazil, China, and the European Union.

May has made important contributions to measurement science, with application to national and global problems including global warming and food security. He was involved in assessing baseline hydrocarbon levels in Prince William Sound prior to the building of the Trans-Alaska Pipeline System. He has developed protocols for the collection of environmental samples suitable for trace organic analysis, including techniques in liquid chromatography.

== Early life and education ==
Willie May was born in Birmingham, Alabama and received a Bachelor of Science degree in chemistry from Knoxville College in 1968. He went on to earn a Ph.D. in analytical chemistry from the University of Maryland in 1977.

== Career ==
May began working at NIST in 1971, when it was known as the National Bureau of Standards, and spent the next four decades at the agency.

In 2014, May was named acting director of NIST and Acting Under Secretary of Commerce for Standards and Technology. He was permanently appointed to both positions in 2015 and confirmed by the United States Senate in May of that year. In January 2017 he resigned at the end of the Obama administration. On May 9, 2018, he was named the Vice President for Research and Economic Development at Morgan State University.

== See also ==
- List of directors of the National Institute of Standards and Technology

Government offices
Preceded by Patrick D. Gallagher	15th Director of the National Institute of Standards and Technology; 2015 - 2017	Succeeded by Walter Copan
