= Joan Gabel =

Chancellor of the University of Pittsburgh, 2023-present

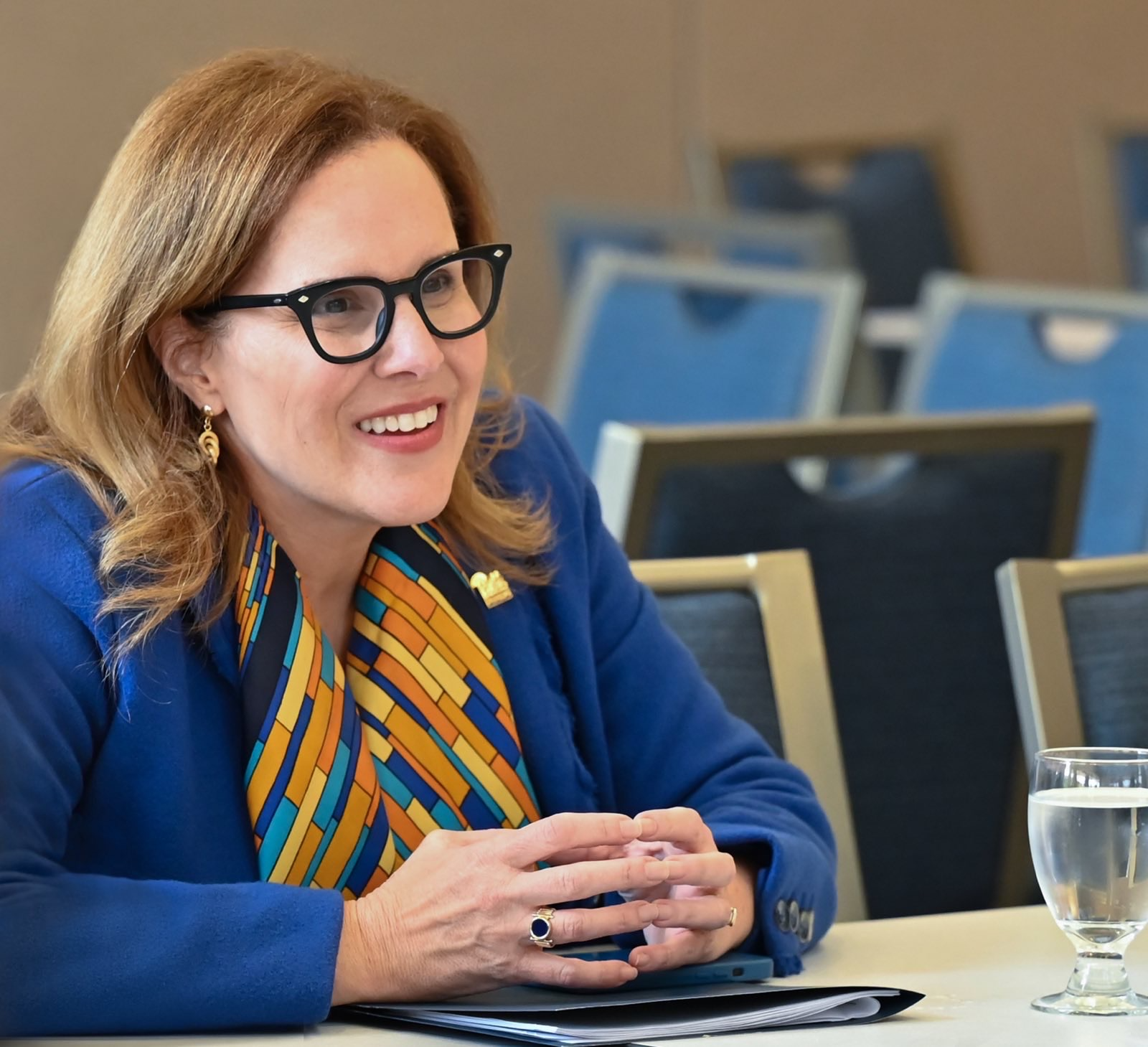

19th Chancellor of the University of Pittsburgh
- Incumbent
- Assumed office July 17, 2023
- Preceded by: Patrick D. Gallagher

17th President of the University of Minnesota
- In office July 1, 2019 – June 9, 2023
- Preceded by: Eric Kaler
- Succeeded by: Jeff Ettinger (interim)

Personal details
- Born: New York City, U.S.
- Education: Haverford College (BA); University of Georgia (JD)

Joan T. A. Gabel is an American academic administrator who has served as the chancellor and CEO of the University of Pittsburgh since 2023. She previously served as president of the University of Minnesota from 2019 to 2023. She was the first woman to serve as president of the University of Minnesota.

== Early life and education ==
Gabel was born in New York City and grew up in Atlanta. At age 16, Gabel entered Haverford College, where she earned a bachelor's degree in philosophy in 1988. She then worked in employee benefits for two years. She earned a J.D. degree from the University of Georgia School of Law in 1993.

== Career ==
=== Early career ===
Gabel started her career as an attorney in Atlanta. From 1996 to 2007, she was a professor of legal studies at Georgia State University, then was a professor of business law and department chair at Florida State University from 2007 to 2010. From 2010 to 2015, Gabel served as the dean of the college of business at the University of Missouri, during which time she was recognized as "a shining star" in business school administration by The Wall Street Journal. She became the provost of the University of South Carolina in 2015, where she created the Galen Fellows and Rhodos Fellows programs.

=== University leadership positions ===
==== University of Minnesota presidency ====
In December 2018, the University of Minnesota regents unanimously approved Gabel as president of the state's university system; she was selected from among 67 applicants. Gabel was the first woman to hold the office.

Gabel shifted the university to online courses during the COVID-19 pandemic and, following George Floyd's murder, negotiated new terms for the Minneapolis Police Department's presence on campus.

As president of UMN, Gabel oversaw increases in the university's research, fundraising, and graduation rates. During her tenure, UMN surpassed a record-breaking $1 billion in annual research expenditures and became one of the top one percent of patent-producing universities. In 2020, the Department of Defense awarded the university funding to create a new Manufacturing Innovation Institute. Using the lessons learned about the use of technology and online education during the COVID-19 pandemic, Gabel introduced an accelerated health care program administered at the university's Rochester campus, called NXT GEN MED.

In 2021, Gabel created the university's inaugural Senior Advisor to the President for Native American Affairs in order to deepen the relationship between UMN, a land-grant university, and Minnesota's Tribal Nations.

During the later part of her tenure at the University of Minnesota, Gabel faced some criticism regarding her compensation and approved outside activities. In December 2022, Gabel joined the board of Securian Financial Group following the University of Minnesota's regents giving her permission to do so, approving a "conflict management plan" by a 9-3 public vote. Despite this, Gabel's membership on the Securian board came under scrutiny because Securian had contracts with the university, and Gabel voluntarily resigned from the Securian board in January 2023. There was also a perceived conflict of interest regarding the appointment of the interim chancellor of University of Minnesota's Duluth campus despite Gabel's recusal from the process.

==== University of Pittsburgh chancellor and CEO ====
In April 2023, it was announced that Gabel would leave the University of Minnesota to become the 19th chancellor and chief executive officer of the University of Pittsburgh. She began her tenure at the University of Pittsburgh on July 17, 2023.

Since joining Pitt, Gabel has refocused the campus on a renewed strategic planning process, coined Reimagining Plan for Pitt. On her 100th day as Chancellor, Pitt announced a new program, the Pitt Finish Line Grant, designed to provide financial aid to lower-income students to help them complete their degrees.

In the fall of 2023, Gabel was named one of thirteen university presidents spearheading the College Presidents for Civic Preparedness, a new initiative convened by the Institute for Citizens & Scholars to create better informed and more empowered citizens. Gabel was also selected to serve as the chair of the Council of Presidents for the Association of Public and Land Grant Universities. In January 2024, Gabel was named to the Pittsburgh Business Times fifth annual Power 100.

== Awards ==
- Fulbright Scholar (2018)
- Holmes-Cardozo Award
- Junior Distinguished Faculty Award
- Kay Duffy Outstanding Service Award
- Proceedings Paper Award
- Pittsburgh Power 100, Pittsburgh Business Times (2024)
- City & State PA Power 100

== Memberships ==
- American Academy of Arts and Sciences, elected member
- American Academy of Arts and Sciences, Education Advisory Committee
- Association of American Universities, board member
- American Business Law Journal, editor-in-chief
- Association of Public and Land-grant Universities, chair-elect
- Council on Competitiveness, university vice chair
- Fulbright Scholar Advisory Board, chair

== See also ==
- List of presidents of the University of Minnesota

Academic offices
Preceded by Eric Kaler	17th President of the University of Minnesota; 2019 – 2023	Succeeded by Jeff Ettinger (interim)
Preceded by Patrick D. Gallagher	19th Chancellor of the University of Pittsburgh; 2023 – present	Incumbent
