= Appropriations Committee =

Appropriations Committee may refer to:

- United States House Committee on Appropriations
- United States Senate Committee on Appropriations

== See also ==
- Appropriation bill
