= William A. Jeffrey =

American scientist

William Jeffrey
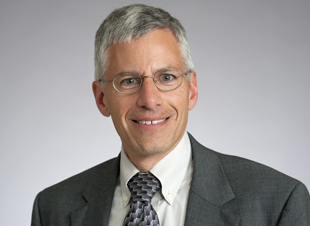
- Jeffrey in 2011

13th Director of the National Institute of Standards and Technology
- In office 2005–2007
- President: George W. Bush
- Preceded by: Arden L. Bement Jr.
- Succeeded by: Patrick D. Gallagher
- Scientific career
- Education: Harvard University; Massachusetts Institute of Technology
- Fields: Physics, astronomy
- Workplaces: NIST; HRL Laboratories; SRI International
- Thesis: Variational problems in astrophysics (1988)

William A. Jeffrey is an American astronomer and astrophysicist. He was the CEO of SRI International from 2014 to 2021 and the 13th director of the National Institute of Standards and Technology from 2005 to 2007.

== Education ==
He earned a bachelor of science in physics from the Massachusetts Institute of Technology and a Ph.D. in astronomy from Harvard University.

== Early career ==
Jeffrey was the deputy director for the Advanced Technology Office and chief scientist for the Tactical Technology Office with the Defense Advanced Research Projects Agency (DARPA).

He was involved in federal science and technology programs from 1988 to 2008. He served as senior director for homeland and national security and the assistant director for space and aeronautics at the Office of Science and Technology Policy (OSTP) within the Executive Office of the President. At OSTP he was instrumental in guiding the creation and development of the science and technology aspects of the newly created Department of Homeland Security especially as they relate to weapons of mass destruction countermeasures.

He also served as the assistant deputy for technology at the Defense Airborne Reconnaissance Office, where he supervised sensor development for the RQ-1 Predator and RQ-4 Global Hawk Unmanned Aerial Vehicles (UAVs) and the development of common standards that allow for cross-service and cross-agency transfer of imagery and intelligence products. He also spent several years working at the Institute for Defense Analyses performing technical analyses in support of the Department of Defense.

== Later career ==
He was the 13th director of the National Institute of Standards and Technology (NIST), sworn into the office on July 26, 2005. He was nominated by President Bush on May 25, 2005, and confirmed by the U.S. Senate on July 22, 2005. In his capacity as NIST Director, he was a member of the Election Assistance Commission's Technical Guidelines Development Committee, tasked with assisting the EAC in drafting the Voluntary Voting System Guidelines. Jeffrey resigned as NIST Director in September, 2007, to assume the post of director of the Science and Technology Division, Studies and Analyses Center, Institute for Defense Analyses. Jeffrey was the president and CEO of HRL Laboratories, LLC from September 2008.

He became the president and CEO of SRI International in September 2014, succeeding Curtis Carlson. He was succeeded by David Parekh in October 2021.

== Awards and memberships ==
In 2008, he received the Navigator Award from the Potomac Institute for Policy Studies. He was awarded the Secretary of Defense Medal for Outstanding Public Service. Jeffrey is a member of the Board of Directors of TE Connectivity, a fellow of the American Physical Society, and an honorary member of the International Society of Automation. In 2026 he joined the board of directors of the California Council on Science and Technology.

Government offices
Preceded by Arden L. Bement Jr.	13th Director of the National Institute of Standards and Technology; 2005 - 2007	Succeeded by Patrick D. Gallagher
