= Committee on Armed Services =

Committee on Armed Services can refer to:

- United States Senate Committee on Armed Services
- United States House Committee on Armed Services
