= Assistant Secretary of Commerce for Legislative and Intergovernmental Affairs =

Position in the US Department of Commerce

United States Assistant Secretary of Commerce for Legislative and Intergovernmental Affairs
- Incumbent; Harry Kumar since February 6, 2026
- United States Department of Commerce
- Nominator: The president with Senate advice and consent
- Term length: No fixed term
- Website: Office of Legislative and Intergovernmental Affairs (OLIA)

The assistant secretary of commerce for legislative and intergovernmental affairs is the Department of Commerce's principal liaison to the U.S. Congress, state governors, and other state officials.

== Role and responsibilities ==
The assistant secretary is responsible for coordinating and overseeing department legislative activity, which entails working closely with the Appropriations, oversight, and authorization (Armed Services) committees in the House and Senate to ensure department priorities are considered throughout the legislative and oversight process. He also routinely advises the Secretary of Commerce (to whom they report), the deputy secretary, and other senior leadership in the Department of Commerce on legislative matters and congressional relations, with the exception of certain areas under the purview of the Office of the General Counsel, and the chief financial officer and assistant secretary for administration. They lead the confirmation process for all presidential nominees who require Senate approval to serve in the department. The assistant secretary is nominated by the president and requires Senate confirmation before serving.

The assistant secretary is assisted by the deputy assistant secretary for legislative and intergovernmental affairs, the director of legislative affairs, and the director of intergovernmental affairs. The deputy assistant secretary is the principal deputy to the assistant secretary on all operational matters and performs the duties of the assistant secretary during the latter's absence. The director of legislative affairs advises the Assistant and deputy secretaries on the Department of Commerce's relationship with Congress, congressional committees, and individual members of the House and Senate. The director of intergovernmental affairs assists the assistant and deputy secretaries in managing relationships with state, county, and municipal governments.
