= Arielle Roth =

American government official

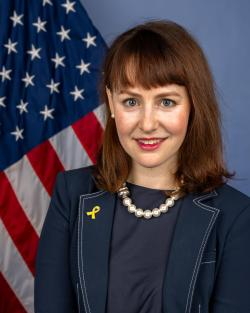
- 2026 Pic
- Education: University of Toronto (BA); McGill University Faculty of Law (LLB)
- Occupations: Attorney, technology policy expert
- Known for: Telecommunications policy, 5G regulation
- Spouse: Yaakov Roth

Arielle Roth is an American government official. She has served as Assistant Secretary of Commerce for Communications and Information and as Administrator, National Telecommunications and Information Administration (NTIA) since July 30, 2025. In her role with the NTIA, she is responsible for advising the executive branch of the U.S. government on communications, broadband, and internet policy.

== Education ==
Roth completed her undergraduate education at the University of Toronto. She earned a law degree from McGill University Faculty of Law.

== Public service career ==
Prior to her role as Assistant Secretary of Commerce, Roth served as Policy Director for Telecommunications on the U.S. Senate Committee on Commerce, Science, and Transportation.

She was nominated to the role of Assistant Secretary of Commerce on February 3, 2025. She was confirmed by the U.S. Senate on July 23, 2025, by a 51–41 vote. She was sworn in on July 30, 2025.

== Personal life ==
Roth is married to Yaakov M. Roth, Principal Deputy Assistant Attorney General of the Civil Division of the United States Department of Justice. She and her husband have six children.

She is a member of the Federalist Society.
