= Chief Financial Officer and Assistant Secretary for Administration =

United States Department of Commerce

United States Department of Commerce Chief Financial Officer and Assistant Secretary for Administration
- Incumbent; Vacant
- Website: Office of the Chief Financial Officer and Assistant Secretary for Administration - Department of Commerce

The Chief Financial Officer and Assistant Secretary for Administration of the United States Department of Commerce oversees management matters in the Commerce Department, including financial resources, human resources, and facilities. The Assistant Secretary establishes and monitors implementation of Departmental administrative policies, including budget and financial management, strategic planning and performance management, human resources management and civil rights, employee safety and health, procurement, grants management, travel and transportation of household goods, real property and facilities management, directives management, and security. He coordinates implementation of government-wide and Departmental management initiatives. Performance of functions related to the position of Chief Financial Officer are as required per the Chief Financial Officers Act of 1990. The Assistant Secretary is also responsible for the management of the Department of Commerce headquarters in the Herbert C. Hoover Building in Washington, D.C. The office is currently vacant.

The position of Chief Financial Officer and Assistant Secretary for Administration was established by Public Law 83-471 § 304, July 2, 1954, 68 Stat. 430 (15 USC §1506). His authority is delegated through Department of Commerce Organization Order 10-5 "Chief Financial Officer and Assistant Secretary for Administration". The Assistant Secretary reports and is responsible to the Secretary of Commerce. Appointment of the Assistant Secretary is by the President and requires Senate approval. He is assisted by the Deputy Assistant Secretary for Administration, the Director for Financial Management and Deputy Chief Financial Officer, the Deputy Assistant Secretary for Resource Management, and the executive director of CommerceConnect. The Deputy Assistant Secretary for Administration is the principal assistant to the Assistant Secretary and performs the duties of the Assistant Secretary during the latter's absence.

The Assistant Secretary is furthermore responsible for coordinating Department-wide preparation of national emergency plans and preparedness programs as required by Executive Order 12656.
