= National Telecommunications and Information Administration =

American government agency

Agency overview
- Formed: 1978; 48 years ago
- Jurisdiction: United States government
- Headquarters: Herbert C. Hoover Building 1401 Constitution Avenue NW Washington, D.C., U.S.; 38°53′39.48″N 77°1′58.08″W
- Annual budget: US$34 million (2009); US$40 million (est. 2010); US$46 million (est. 2011)
- Agency executives: Arielle Roth, Assistant Secretary for Communications and Information; Sarah Morris (acting), Deputy Assistant Secretary for Communications and Information; Grace Abuhamad, Chief of Staff
- Parent agency: United States Department of Commerce
- Website: ntia.gov

The National Telecommunications and Information Administration (NTIA) is a bureau of the United States Department of Commerce that serves as the president's principal adviser on telecommunications policies pertaining to the United States' economic and technological advancement and to regulation of the telecommunications industry.

== Main offices ==
=== Office of Policy Analysis and Development (OPAD) ===
The Office of Policy Analysis and Development (OPAD) is the domestic policy division of the NTIA. OPAD is responsible for executing and managing research and analysis and preparing policy recommendations for the Executive Branch. The domestic policy office is responsible for creating policies that promote innovation and growth, both politically and economically, that provide for American businesses and consumers, alike.

These policies affect how Americans use and gain access to the Wireless services like the Internet, telephone service and video programming. Issues the OPAD deals with include making sure all Americans have access to integrated broadband services, content is regulated to keep children safe on the Internet, competition in the telecommunication and information industries are cooperative and that user privacy is protected.

Additionally, OPAD carries out research, files reports, letters and formal comments, and proposes and responds to federal legislation for the Federal Communications Commission (FCC) and other regulatory committees.

=== Office of International Affairs (OIA) ===
In consultation with other U.S. agencies and the U.S. private sector, OIA partakes in both international and regional conferences and conventions to advocate for policies that open information and communication technology (ICT) markets and boost competition.

The two main goals of the OIA are to:

1. Formulate international ICT policy, goals, and strategies:
  - By leveraging the knowledge of the Office of Spectrum Management, Office of Policy Analysis and Development, Office of Telecommunications and Information Applications, and the Institute for Telecommunications Sciences, the OIA can provide important policy and technical breakdowns to the U.S. negotiators and interagency consignments.
  - The OIA also provides long-lasting advice to the Executive Branch contemplating the management of the Internet's domain name and numbering system (DNS), which is critical to the overall infrastructure.
2. Advocate U.S. policy interests
  - The goal of the OIA here is to foster pro-competitive and flexible policy environments that:
  - Carry the profits of ICTs to the global community
  - Open up foreign market opportunities for U.S. Telecommunications and Information Technology companies
  - Observe the esteemed role of all stakeholders in the production and facilitation of the Internet as well as telecommunications policy issues occurring in the ICT community

The OIA staff helps to participate in U.S. delegations of many different meetings in which global telecommunications and information policy is discussed and developed by providing the negotiators critical policy and expertise advice.

=== Institute for Telecommunication Sciences (ITS) ===
The Institute for Telecommunication Sciences (ITS) is the research and engineering laboratory of the NTIA. ITS provides technical support to NTIA by further advancing telecommunications and information infrastructure development, strengthening domestic competition, enhancing U.S. telecommunications trade deals, as well as promoting a more effective use of the radio spectrum. Additionally, ITS serves as a key federal appliance in investigating the current telecommunications’ challenges of other federal agencies, state and local governments, private corporations and associations, and international organizations.

=== Office of Internet Connectivity and Growth (OICG) ===
The Office of Internet Connectivity and Growth (OICG), formerly known as The Office of Telecommunications and Information Applications or OITA, collaborates public and non-profit entities in productively using telecommunications and information technologies to complete national goals in addition to adequately providing public services. The OICG is also currently administering programs that are helping people switch to digital television, the Broadband Technology Opportunity Program (BTOP), and Public Safety Interoperable Communications (PSIC) Grant Program.

Additionally, the OICG is involved with the Public Telecommunications Facilities Program (PTFP), a competitive grant program that assists public broadcasting stations, state and local governments, Indian tribes, and non-profit organizations construct facilities to bring educational and cultural programs to the American public using telecommunication broadcast technologies. Funds are allocated to support the Pan-Pacific Educational and Cultural Experiments by Satellite (PEACESAT) project, which provides satellite-delivered education, medical, and environmental emergency telecommunications to numerous small-island countries and territories in the Pacific Ocean area.

The OICG is also involved with the New York City 9/11 Program and the Technology Opportunities Program (TOP). The NYC 9/11 Program provided the Metropolitan Television Alliance (MTVA) with $29.5 million for the creation and classification costs of the temporary digital television broadcast system in the NYC area until a more permanent facility is finished atop the Freedom Tower. The TOP program, which was last awarded grants in 2004, plays a significant role in understanding the vision of an information society by providing logical applications of innovative telecommunications and information technologies in both the public and non-profit sectors.

=== Office of Spectrum Management (OSM) ===
The NTIA's Office of Spectrum Management is in charge of regulating use of spectrum allocated to the federal government. It serves in a manner equivalent to the Federal Communications Commission for this purpose.

The OSM carries out the responsibilities of managing the radio frequency spectrum by:

- Establishing and issuing policy overlooking allocations and administrations governing the Federal spectrum use
- Assigning plans for both peacetime and wartime use of the spectrum
- Preparing for, participating in, and establishing the results of international radio conferences
- Maintaining spectrum use databases
- Participating in all aspects of the federal government’s communications regarding emergency readiness activities and automated information security systems

The NTIA Manual of Regulations and Procedures for Federal Radio Frequency Management, also known as the "Red Book," is a publication of the OSM, and is the official source for all technical regulations relating to the use of the electromagnetic frequency spectrum. The NTIA is the regulating agency for all Federal spectrum use.

== Broadband USA ==
In February 2009, the United States Congress passed the American Recovery and Reinvestment Act of 2009, including a $7.2 billion grant to the NTIA and U.S. Department of Agriculture's Rural Utilities Service to bolster broadband access across the United States. Of the grant, $4.7 billion was allocated to provide for the implementation of broadband infrastructure, develop and amplify public computer centers, encourage reasonable adoption of broadband service, and create and sustain a nationwide map of broadband proficiency and availability.

This project, known as the Broadband Technology Opportunities Program is being administered by the NTIA in three levels. The secondary purpose of this project is to reduce the digital gap between the various generation demographics.

Comprehensive Community Infrastructure is the first of three projects in the BTOP. It aims to develop and unfold new or improved broadband internet facilities as well as to network with schools, libraries, hospitals, public safety facilities and other community anchor institutions.

The BTOP will also focus on Public Computer centers and will create new public computer facilities or enhance existing facilities that already offer broadband services to the general public or specific vulnerable populations.

The third project that the BTOP plans to address is Sustainable Broadband Adoption. This project will center in on increasing broadband internet usage, specifically in areas where broadband technology has been unavailable or underutilized. This includes digital literacy training and outreach campaigns to educate the general public on the importance and relevance of broadband in everyday life.

In 2009, the NTIA also launched the State Broadband Data and Development Program to carry out the missions of both the Recovery Act and the Broadband Data Improvement Act to establish an encompassing project that sustains the integration of broadband technology into the economy.

Since the program commenced, NTIA allocated $293 million to 56 grantees, which include one from each state, five territories and the District of Columbia. Grantees are responsible for funding the creation, expansion and maintenance, as well as supporting and encouraging the use of, broadband technology. These efforts are made to aid small businesses and community institutions in the efficient and effective use of technology as well as to conduct research as to the boundaries in broadband expansion and innovation of broadband technology in the future.

== National Broadband Map ==
These programs collected data used by the NTIA to refurbish a public interactive National Broadband Map that was released in February 2011. The map was authorized by Congress with the 2008 Broadband Data Improvement Act and was funded through the 2009 economic stimulus bill. The map will continue to be updated every six months with help from grantees and the general public.

The National Broadband Map is the foundation for efforts to expand and improve broadband internet access around the United States in under-equipped communities as well as assisting businesses and consumers to educate them on broadband internet options. The NTIA's findings show that while strides were made in broadband development and implementation, many people and institutions lack the broadband availability and capability needed for full internet engagement. In the last year, broadband access in households has increased nearly five percent and the number of people not using the internet is down over three percent. Yet, lower demographic groups continue to lack behind in internet capability.

The NTIA also found that many community anchor institutions are generally underserved in broadband connectivity. The data showed that two-thirds of the surveyed schools were signed up for broadband service that provide less than half the speed that educational technology studies recommend and only four percent of libraries subscribe to recommended broadband speeds.

Along with the update of the National Broadband Map, the NTIA will sustain its efforts to increase broadband implementation and will move to expand its collaboration efforts to serve as an expansive network for broadband developers.

== 2020 data breach ==
In 2020, the NTIA suffered a data breach following a cyberattack likely conducted by a nation state adversary, possibly Russia.

== See also ==
- First Responder Network Authority (FirstNet), an independent authority within NTIA
- Office of Telecommunications Policy (OTP), a predecessor of NTIA
- White Spaces
