= List of University of Maryland, Baltimore County people =

This is a list of people associated with the University of Maryland, Baltimore County.

== Academia ==
=== African American Studies ===
- Miriam DeCosta-Willis - professor and director of graduate studies (retired 1999)

=== Anthropology ===
- Robert A. Rubinstein – cultural anthropologist

=== Arts ===
- Maurice Berger – research professor and chief curator of the Center for Art, Design and Visual Culture
- Jason Burik – Lego artist
- Irene Chan – artist and architect
- Mantle Hood – ethnomusicologist
- Kevin Kallaugher – artist-in-residence, cartoonist for The Baltimore Sun
- Kathy O'Dell – art historian
- Anna Rubin - American composer of electroacoustic and instrumental music
- Stuart Saunders Smith – percussionist and composer
- William H. Thomas – researcher of geriatric medicine and elder care
- Stan Vanderbeek – experimental filmmaker
- Fred Worden – filmmaker involved in experimental cinema

=== Chemistry ===
- Ramachandra S. Hosmane – organic chemist
- Michael F. Summers – Robert E. Meyerhoff Chair for Excellence in Research and Mentoring and a distinguished professor of chemistry and biochemistry; HHMI investigator since 1994

=== Education ===
- Mavis Sanders, professor of education; director of Sherman Center for Early Learning in Urban Communities 2017–2021

=== Engineering ===
- Jeanne Van Briesen - civil engineer and dean of the UMBC College of Engineering and Information Technology
- Keith Bowman – materials scientist and former dean of the UMBC College of Engineering and Information Technology

=== English ===
- Gloria Oden – Pulitzer Prize-nominated poet

=== Gender and women's studies ===
- Anne Brodsky – director of the Gender and Women's Studies Program
- Carole McCann – researches reproductive politics, cultural politics of gender, sexuality, race and science, and U.S. women's history

=== Geography and environmental systems ===
- Erle Ellis – ecologist studying human-environmental changes
- Melanie Harrison Okoro – marine estuarine and environmental scientist

=== Health sciences ===
- Anthony M. Johnson – deputy director of the Mid-InfraRed Technologies for Health and the Environment project
- William H. Thomas – physician and professor at the UMBC Erickson School of Aging; creator of the Senior Emergency Department

=== History ===
- Kate Brown – 2009 Guggenheim Fellow
- Warren I. Cohen – diplomatic historian, sinologist, former president of the Society for Historians of American Foreign Relations

=== Information technology ===
- Tülay Adalı – Distinguished University Professor of Computer Science and Electrical Engineering
- Tim Finin – computer scientist working on AI, knowledge representation, and reasoning
- Anupam Joshi – expert in computer security
- Samuel J. Lomonaco Jr. – computer scientist and mathematician
- Andrew Sears – computer scientist focused on issues related to human-computer interaction
- Alan Sherman – computer scientist and chess team faculty advisor
- Houbing Song – information systems professor focused on cyber-physical systems, AI, and machine learning

=== Journalism ===
- Christopher Corbett – former news editor and reporter with the Associated Press

=== Language, Literacy and Culture ===
- Christine Mallinson - professor of language, literacy, and culture and affiliate professor of gender, women's and sexuality studies
- Craig J Saper - professor of language, Literacy, & Culture

=== Law ===
- Rabia Chaudry – attorney for Adnan Syed

=== Mathematics ===
- Manil Suri – mathematician and writer of a trilogy of novels

=== Physics ===
- Sebastian Deffner – quantum thermodynamics
- Anthony M. Johnson – ultra-fast nonlinear optics
- Valerie Thomas – scientist and inventor

=== Political science ===
- Mary Pat Clarke – member of the Baltimore City Council
- Thomas Schaller – talk show host and political commentator
- Adam Yarmolinsky – academic, educator, author

=== Psychology ===
- Stephen E. Braude – parapsychologist and temporal logic researcher
- A. Charles Catania - emeritus professor known for his work in Behaviorism
- Susan Sonnenschein - director of the Children and Families, Schooling and Development Lab
- Ellen Handler Spitz – writer and researcher on psychology, children, and the arts

=== Sociology ===
- Fred Pincus - emeritus professor known for his work on affirmative action policies

== Alumni ==
=== Arts and entertainment ===
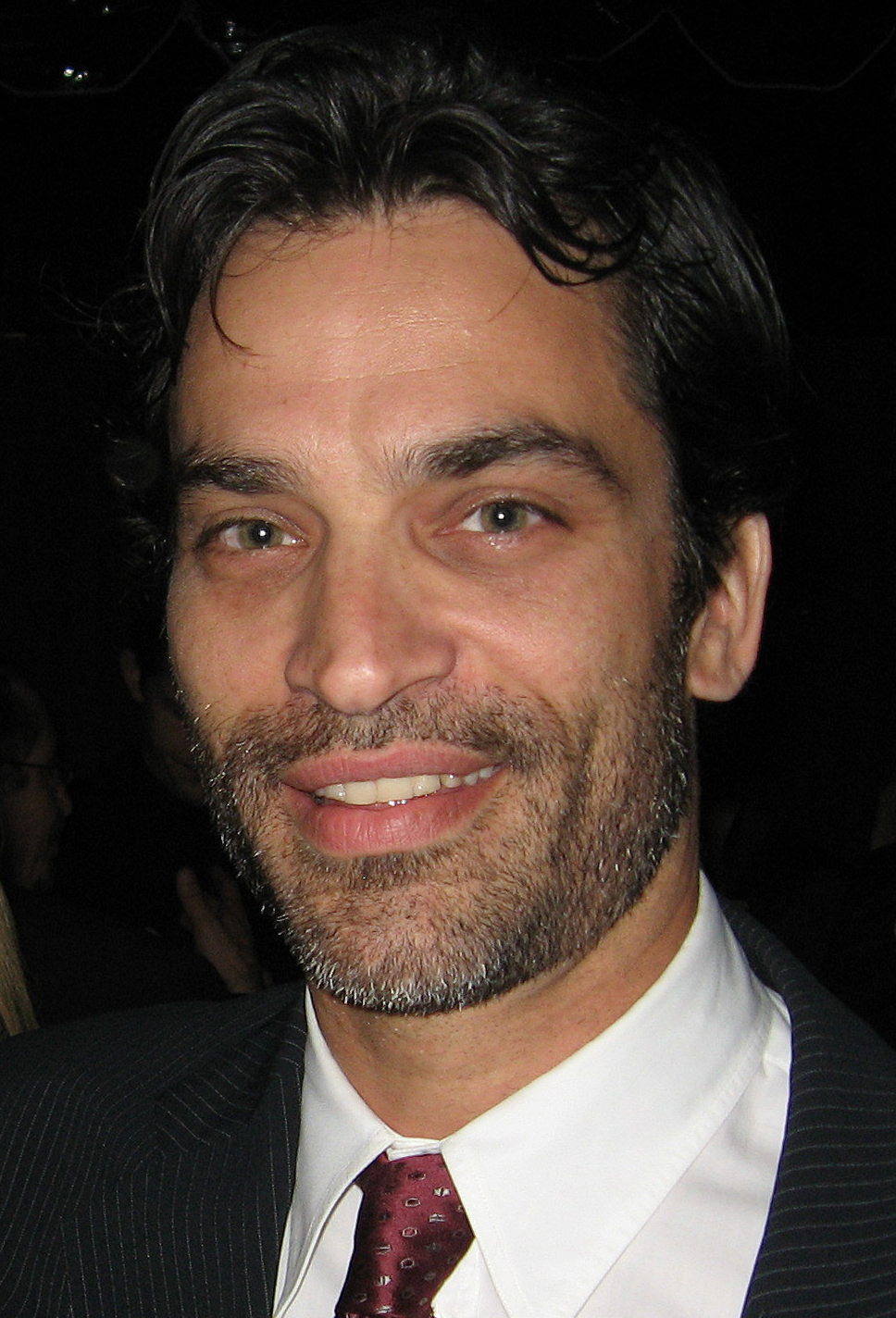
Johnathon Schaech at the 15th Annual Screen Actors Guild Awards

- Dean Alexander – photographer based in Baltimore
- Mario Armstrong – radio and television talk show host
- Richard Chisolm – cinematographer and film-maker
- Brian Dannelly – director of Saved! and the series Weeds
- Shari Elliker – talk show host and radio personality
- Steven Fischer – filmmaker
- Stavros Halkias – stand-up comedian, podcaster, and co-creator of the Cum Town podcast
- Tony Harris – news anchor for Al Jazeera English and Discovery Communications
- Young Mazino – actor
- Robert Mugge – documentary filmmaker
- Jeremy Penn – artist, painter
- Johnathon Schaech – actor
- Scott Seiss – actor, comedian and TikToker
- Hadieh Shafie – contemporary visual artist
- Kathleen Turner – Academy Award-nominated actress
- Matthew VanDyke – documentary filmmaker, revolutionary, and former journalist
- Sherry Vine – Project Runway star
- Peter K. Wood – professional magician and illusionist

=== Business ===
- Drew Westervelt – creator of Hex Performance; NLL attack for the Colorado Mammoth; Major League Lacrosse attack for the Chesapeake Bayhawks Associated Black Charities; former board member of the Baltimore City Public Schools

=== Chess ===
- Pascal Charbonneau – Canadian Grandmaster
- Greg Shahade – chess International Master, founded the United States Chess League
- Tal Shaked – chess Grandmaster

=== Culinary ===
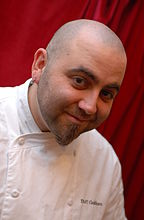
Duff Goldman, owner of Charm City Cakes and star of Ace of Cakes on Food Network

- Duff Goldman – chef, owner of Charm City Cakes, star of the show Ace of Cakes
- Geof Manthorne – cake decorator, star of the show Ace of Cakes

=== Education ===
- James P. Clements – 15th president of Clemson University and 23rd president of West Virginia University

=== Government and politics ===
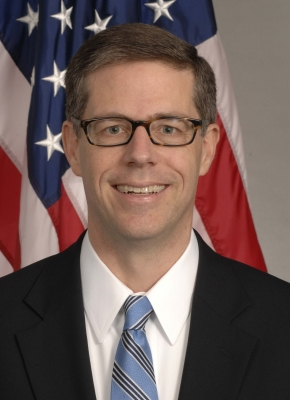
Mark Doms, nominated to be the Under Secretary of Commerce for Economic Affairs by President Barack Obama in 2012

- Samuel Ankama – Namibian politician, traditional leader, and educator
- Gail H. Bates – member of the Maryland House of Delegates
- Jon S. Cardin – former member of the Maryland House of Delegates
- Paul W. Comfort – head of the Maryland Transit Administration
- Thomas E. Dewberry (born 1951) – judge and member of the Maryland House of Delegates
- Ron Dillon, Jr. – politician and former chairman of the County Council of Anne Arundel County, Maryland
- Mark Doms – Under Secretary of Commerce for Economic Affairs for the United States Department of Commerce
- Adrienne A. Jones – first African-American woman to serve as speaker pro tem in the Maryland House of Delegates
- Allan Kittleman – county executive of Howard County, Maryland, and former senate minority whip
- Ari Ne'eman – member of the National Council on Disability (presidential-appointed position) and disability rights advocate
- Dan Patrick – lieutenant governor of Texas
- Victoria L. Schade – former member of the Maryland House of Delegates

=== Literature ===
- Bassey Ikpi – spoken-word poet, writer, and mental health advocate

=== Medicine ===
- Jerome Adams – Surgeon General of the United States
- Kizzmekia Corbett – viral immunologist at the Vaccine Research Center (VRC) at the National Institute of Allergy and Infectious Diseases
- Blair Grubb – professor of Medicine and researcher on Postural Tachycardia Syndrome
- Sylvia Trent-Adams – Surgeon General of the United States
- Diana West – author and lactation consultant

=== Music ===
- Lafayette Gilchrist – jazz pianist
- Andy Stack – founding member of the band Wye Oak

=== Social sciences ===
- Anna Gifty Opoku-Agyeman – writer, activist, economist; co-founder of the Sadie Collective and Black Birders Week

=== Sports ===
==== Baseball ====
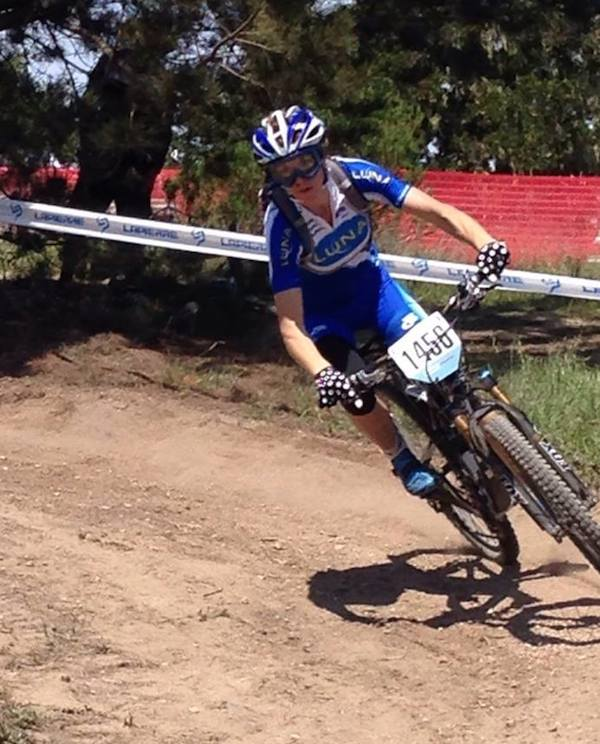
Marla Streb came in first place at the Sea Otter Enduro 2014.

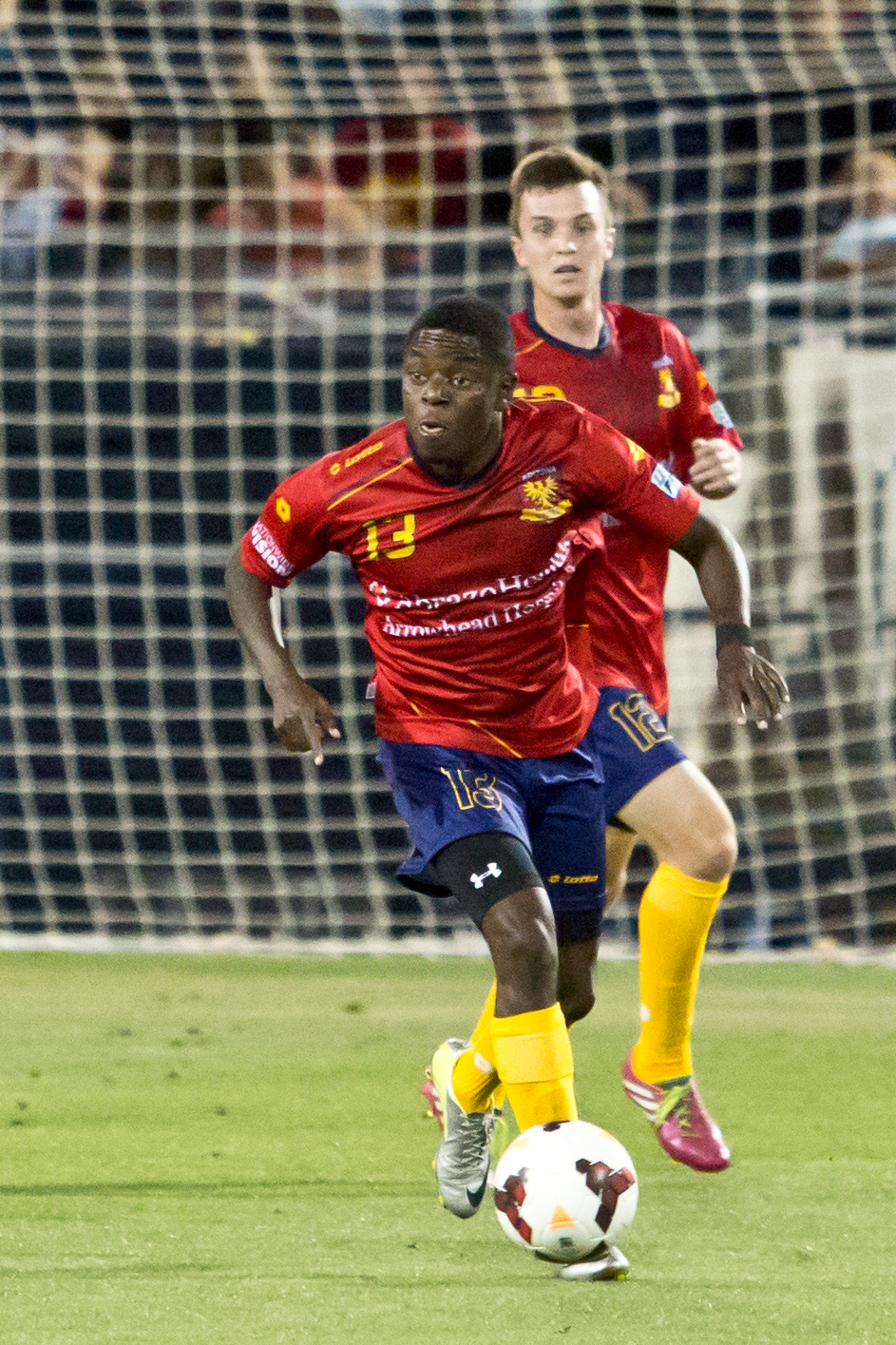
Kadeem Dacres currently plays for the Louisville City FC.

- Zach Clark – pitcher for the Baltimore Orioles
- Wayne Franklin – retired pitcher for the Houston Astros (2000–2001), Milwaukee Brewers (2002–2003), San Francisco Giants (2004), New York Yankees (2005), and Atlanta Braves (2006)
- Bob Mumma – UMBC's baseball coach
- Jay Witasick – professional baseball pitcher in Major League Baseball 1996–2007

==== Basketball ====
- Jairus Lyles – point guard for Utah Jazz (2018)

==== Equestrian ====
- Lawrence W. Jennings – Thoroughbred racehorse trainer

==== Lacrosse ====
- Dan Marohl – National Lacrosse League (NLL) forward for the Philadelphia Wings
- Steve Marohl – NLL forward for the Baltimore Thunder and the Pittsburgh Crossefire; Major League Lacrosse (MLL) attack for the Baltimore Bayhawks
- Brendan Mundorf – NLL forward for the New York Titans; MLL forward for the Denver Outlaws
- Peet Poillon – professional lacrosse player for the Chesapeake Bayhawks
- Jeff Ratcliffe – NLL forward for the New York Titans
- Drew Westervelt – professional lacrosse player for the Colorado Mammoth

==== Mountain biking ====
- Marla Streb – professional mountain bike racer

==== Soccer ====
- Pete Caringi – professional soccer player, played for the Oklahoma City Energy and Baltimore Bohemians
- Kadeem Dacres – professional soccer player, played for Louisville City FC
- Kevin Gnatiko – professional soccer player, played for Crystal Palace Baltimore
- Levi Houapeu – professional soccer player, played for Rochester Rhinos
- Sammy Kahsai – professional soccer player, played as a midfielder for Maryland Bobcats FC
- Brian Rowland – Canadian professional indoor-soccer player; played for the Canada men's national soccer team
- Matt Watson – professional soccer player, played for the Chicago Fire Soccer Club
- Steve Zerhusen – goalkeeper for the North American Soccer League

==== Swimming ====
- Mehdi Addadi – swimmer in the 2000 Summer Olympics in Sydney

==== Track and field ====
- Cleopatra Borel – track & field athlete competing in the 2016 Summer Olympics in Rio de Janeiro

=== Technology ===
- Tamara G. Kolda – applied mathematician and Distinguished Technical Staff at Sandia National Laboratories
- Joseph Reagle – academic and author focused on technology and Wikipedia
- Ralph Semmel – computer scientist and the eighth director of the Johns Hopkins University Applied Physics Laboratory
