= UMBC Retrievers men's soccer =

American college soccer team

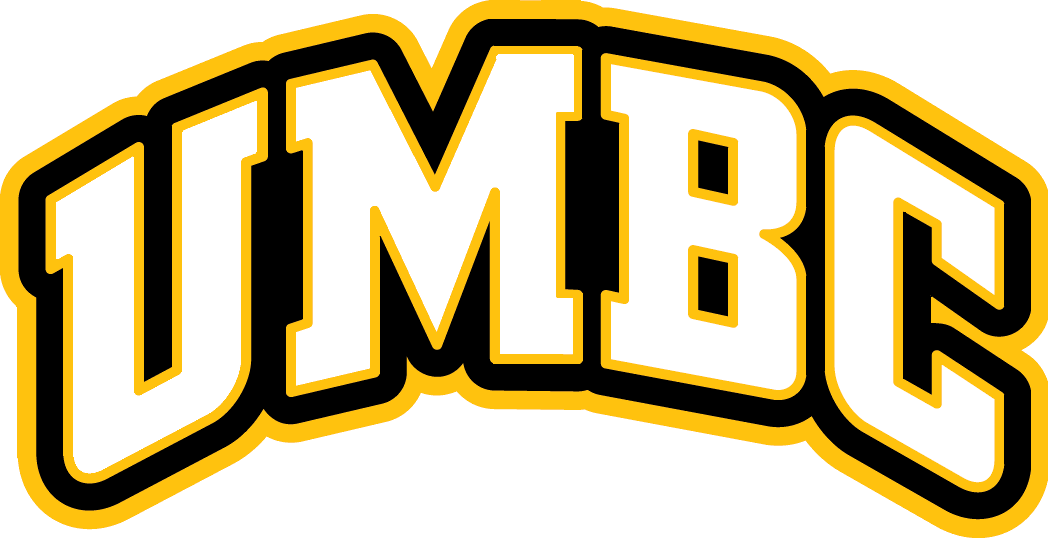
- Founded: 1968; 58 years ago
- University: University of Maryland, Baltimore County
- Head coach: Pete Caringi
- Conference: America East
- Location: Baltimore, Maryland, US
- Stadium: Retriever Soccer Park (capacity: 2,000)
- Nickname: Retrievers
- Colors: Black and gold
Home	Away

NCAA tournament College Cup
- 2014

NCAA tournament appearances
- 1999, 2010, 2012, 2013, 2014

Conference tournament championships
- 1999, 2010, 2012, 2013, 2014

Conference regular season championships
- 1999, 2002, 2003, 2013, 2014

The UMBC Retrievers men's soccer team represents the University of Maryland, Baltimore County in National Collegiate Athletic Association (NCAA) college soccer competition. UMBC competes as a member of the America East Conference.

== History ==
UMBC created its soccer team in 1968, three years after the founding of the university.

The team's home field, Retriever Soccer Park was completed in the fall of 1998. The stadium center includes a 120-yard by 70-yard field equipped with Bermuda grass.

The Retriever's winnings include: the 1999 NEC Regular Season, the 1999 Northeast Conference Men's Soccer Tournament, the America East Tournament in 2010, 2012, and 2013, 2014 and the America East Regular Season in 2003, 2013 and 2014. Additionally, the men's soccer team advanced to the first round of the 1999 NCAA Division I Men's Soccer Championship, the second round of the NCAA Tournament in 2010, 2012, 2013, and the College Cup Final Four in 2014. 2014 Men's Final Four Coach Pete Caringi selected NSCAA National Coach of the Year

== Players ==
=== Current roster ===
As of 29 Sep 2024

Note: Flags indicate national team as defined under FIFA eligibility rules; some limited exceptions apply. Players may hold more than one non-FIFA nationality.

No.	Pos.	Nation	Player
0	GK	USA	Jackson Boonmast
1	GK	ESP	Emigdio Tormo Lopez
2	DF	ITA	Giuseppe Indelicato
3	MF	USA	Jonah Stoutenborough
4	DF	NOR	Hans Nesheim (c)
5	FW	USA	Robbie Ryerson
6	MF	ITA	Joseph Picotto
7	FW	USA	Loc San
8	MF	USA	Karl Quist-Therson
9	MF	USA	Dominic Dubon
10	MF	GER	Ismailcan Usta
11	FW	USA	Ryan Calheira
12	FW	CAN	Matteo Samori
13	MF	USA	Ty Stroud

No.	Pos.	Nation	Player
14	MF	USA	Aidom Tadesse
16	FW	USA	Gunder Miller
17	FW	USA	Spencer Hanks
19	DF	CAN	Adamo Pantaleo
20	DF	CAN	Jojo Ocran
21	DF	GER	Lasse Kelp (c)
22	DF	USA	Brian Noutchang
23	FW	USA	Kofi Amoah
24	DF	USA	Logan Ehart
25	MF	USA	Shea Nesbitt
27	FW	POL	Alek Wroblewski
28	DF	USA	Ricky Schissler
30	MF	ENG	Jago Lott (c)
32	GK	USA	Anthony Cipressi
33	DF	USA	Sean Thompson

=== Professional players ===
- Jon Bell, Drafted MLS, San Jose Earthquakes
- Billy Heavner, undrafted signee of Minnesota United
- Andrew Bulls Drafted MLS Columbus Crew
- Kadeem Dacres USL Arizona, Louisville, Drafted MLS Chicago Fire
- David Feazell
- Kevin Gnatiko
- Levi Houapeu MLS Philadelphia, USL Rochester, Baltimore Blast
- Derek Phillips
- Brian Rowland
- Matt Watson Chicago Fire, MLS
- Steve Zerhusen NASL Ft. Lauderdale Strikers
- Pete Caringi III Drafted MLS, Montreal Impact, USL Oklahoma City
- Phil Saunders Iceland, Baltimore Blast
- Jordan Becker USL, Rochester Rhinos, Baltimore Blast
- Mamadou Kansaye USL, North Carolina
- Marquez Fernandez NASL Tampa Bay Rowdies
- Oumar Ballo MLS Houston Dynamo
- Milo Kapor Spain 3rd Division
- Guiliano Celenza Baltimore Blast
- PJ Wakefield Baltimore Blast
- Andrew Wells Baltimore Blast
- Billy Nelson Baltimore Blast
- Jason Dieter Baltimore Blast
- Kay Banjo Drafted MLS Vancouver
- Rick Versteeg 1st Division Holland

== Coaches ==
- Pete Caringi, Jr., Head Coach
- Anthony Adams, Associate Head Coach
- Phil Saunders, Goalkeeper Coach
- Pete Caringi III, Assistant Coach
- Seamus Ertel, Video Coordinator

== Honours ==
=== Conference ===
Conference	Championship	Titles	Winning years
Northeast	Tournament	1	1999
Northeast	Regular season	2	1999, 2002
America East	Tournament	4	2010, 2012, 2013, 2014
America East	Regular season	3	2003, 2013, 2014

== Seasons ==
Year	League	Conference	Regular season				Postseason results	Head coach
Year	League	Conference	Finish	Wins	Losses	Ties	Postseason results	Head coach
1986	Division 1	Independent	—	6	12	1	Did not qualify	John Ellinger
1987	Division 1	Independent	—	10	7	2	Did not qualify	John Ellinger
1988	Division 1	Independent	—	8	9	4	Did not qualify	John Ellinger
1989	Division 1	Independent	—	9	8	1	Did not qualify	John Ellinger
1990	Division 1	ECC	?	11	9	0	Did not qualify	John Ellinger
1991	Division 1	ECC	?	15	5	1	ECC Finalist	Pete Caringi Jr.
1992	Division 1	Big South	1st	12	9	0	Big South Semifinalist	Pete Caringi Jr.
1993	Division 1	Big South	2nd	15	3	1	Big South Semifinalist	Pete Caringi Jr.
1994	Division 1	Big South	7th	9	8	1	Did not qualify	Pete Caringi Jr.
1995	Division 1	Big South	3rd	10	9	1	Big South Semifinalist	Pete Caringi Jr.
1996	Division 1	Big South	3rd	9	9	1	Big South Semifinalist	Pete Caringi Jr.
1997	Division 1	Big South	6th	5	12	2	Big South Quarterfinalist	Pete Caringi Jr.
1998	Division 1	NEC	4th	11	7	2	NEC Semifinalist	Pete Caringi Jr.
1999	Division 1	NEC	1st	19	1	2	NEC Champions; NCAA First Round	Pete Caringi Jr.
2000	Division 1	NEC	3rd	15	5	0	NEC Finalist	Pete Caringi Jr.
2001	Division 1	NEC	3rd	9	6	2	NEC Semifinalist	Pete Caringi Jr.
2002	Division 1	NEC	1st	11	6	3	NEC Semifinalist	Pete Caringi Jr.
2003	Division 1	America East	1st	10	3	5	America East Semifinalist	Pete Caringi Jr.
2004	Division 1	America East	2nd	8	6	3	Did not qualify	Pete Caringi Jr.
2005	Division 1	America East	2nd	9	7	3	America East Semifinalist	Pete Caringi Jr.
2006	Division 1	America East	7th	5	9	3	Did not qualify	Pete Caringi Jr.
2007	Division 1	America East	5th	8	7	5	America East Quarterfinalist	Pete Caringi Jr.
2008	Division 1	America East	9th	6	9	2	Did not qualify	Pete Caringi Jr.
2009	Division 1	America East	5th	14	6	0	America East Finalist	Pete Caringi Jr.
2010	Division 1	America East	2nd	12	4	4	America East Champions; NCAA Second Round	Pete Caringi Jr.
2011	Division 1	America East	4th	7	8	3	America East Quarterfinalist	Pete Caringi Jr.
2012	Division 1	America East	2nd	11	4	7	America East Champions; NCAA Second Round	Pete Caringi Jr.
2013	Division 1	America East	1st	16	1	3	America East Champions; NCAA Second Round	Pete Caringi Jr.
2014	Division 1	America East	1st	14	6	5	America East Champions; NCAA Final Four	Pete Caringi Jr.
2015	Division 1	America East	3rd	11	6	3	America East Semifinalist	Pete Caringi Jr.
2016	Division 1	America East	8th	5	9	3	Did not qualify	Pete Caringi Jr.
2017	Division 1	America East	5th	7	6	5	America East Quarterfinalist	Pete Caringi Jr.
2018	Division 1	America East	5th	10	6	4	America East Finalist	Pete Caringi Jr.
2019	Division 1	America East	7th	6	9	1	Did not qualify	Pete Caringi Jr.
2020	Season moved to Spring 2021 due to the COVID-19 pandemic in the United States							
2021 Spring	Division 1	America East	5th	3	4	1	Did not qualify	Pete Caringi Jr.
2021	Division 1	America East	5th	8	8	3	America East Semifinalist	Pete Caringi Jr.
2022	Division 1	America East	3rd	10	6	2	America East Quarterfinalist	Anthony Adams
2023	Division 1	America East	3rd	7	4	5	America East Quarterfinalist	Anthony Adams
2024	Division 1	America East	3rd	8	7	4	America East Semifinalist	Anthony Adams
2025	Division 1	America East	T–5th	6	6	5	America East Quarterfinalist	Anthony Adams
