= Zerhusen =

Zerhusen is a surname. Notable people with the surname include:

- Al Zerhusen (1931–2018), American soccer player
- Steve Zerhusen (born 1957), American soccer player
