= Seiss =

Seiss may refer to:

== People ==
- Isidor Seiss (1840–1905), German musician
- Joseph Seiss (1823–1904), American theologian and Lutheran minister
- Scott Seiss (born 1994), American comedian and TikToker

== Other uses ==
- Self Employment Income Support Scheme (SEISS), a financial support package in the U.K. during COVID-19
