= Jeanne Van Briesen =

American civil engineer and academic

Jeanne Marie Van Briesen
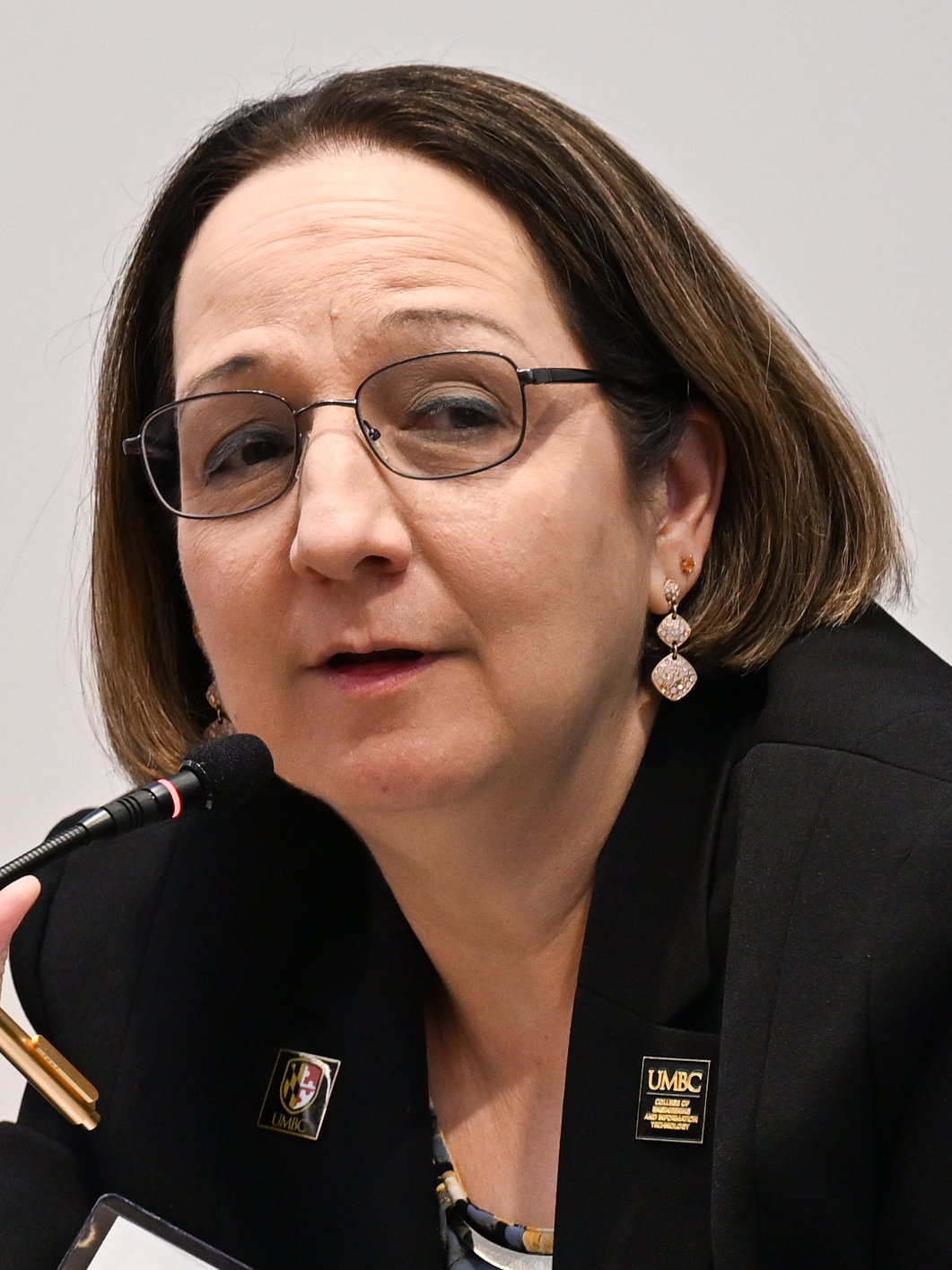
- Van Briesen in 2025
- Education: Northwestern University
- Scientific career
- Workplaces: Northwestern University; Carnegie Mellon University; University of Maryland, Baltimore County
- Thesis: Modeling coupled biogeochemical processes in mixed waste systems (1998)

Jeanne M. Van Briesen is an American civil engineer who is the Dean of the UMBC College of Engineering and Information Technology. Previously, she was the Vice Provost and the Duquesne Light Company Professor at Carnegie Mellon University. Her research considers the realization of sustainable natural and engineered water systems. She is a Fellow of the American Society of Civil Engineers, Environmental and Water Resources Institute, Association of Environmental Engineering and Science Professors and American Association for the Advancement of Science.

== Early life and education ==
VanBriesen was born in Pennsylvania. She was a student at Northwestern University, where she first majored in chemistry and then civil engineering. Her doctoral research considered the computational simulation of biogeochemical processes in mixed waste systems.

== Research and career ==
VanBriesen worked as a high school teacher at Evanston Township High School. She joined the faculty at Carnegie Mellon University in 1999, where she directs the Center for Water Quality in Urban Environmental Systems. Her research considers the sustainability of urban water systems and water cycles in the built environment.

In 2021, VanBriesen was appointed head of the National Science Foundation Division of Chemical, Bioengineering, Environmental and Transport Systems.

== Awards and honors ==
- 2007 Pennsylvania Water Environment Association Professional Research Award
- 2009 American Society of Civil Engineers Professor of the Year
- 2009 West Chester East High School Hall of Fame
- 2009 McGraw-Hill/ AEESP Award for Outstanding Teaching
- 2010 Association of Environmental Engineering and Science Professors Distinguished Service Award
- 2011 National Academy of Engineering Armstrong Endowment for Young Engineers Gilbreth Lectureship
- 2015 American Society of Civil Engineers Margaret Petersen Award
- 2015 Carnegie Science Center Environmental Award
- 2015 Carnegie Mellon University Barbara Lazarus Award
- 2016 Elected Fellow of the Environmental and Water Resources Institute
- 2016 Achievement Rewards for College Scientists Alumni Hall of Fame
- 2018 Elected Fellow of the American Society of Civil Engineers
- 2019 Elected Fellow of the Association of Environmental Engineering and Science Professors
- 2019 PA AWWA Special Recognition Award
- 2019 SIGKDD 2019 Test-of-Time paper award
- 2022 Elected Fellow of the American Association for the Advancement of Science

== Selected publications ==
- Jure Leskovec; Andreas Krause; Carlos Guestrin; Christos Faloutsos; Jeanne VanBriesen; Natalie Glance (2007), Cost-effective outbreak detection in networks, Association for Computing Machinery, doi:10.1145/1281192.1281239, Wikidata Q59551665
- Avi Ostfeld; James G. Uber; Elad Salomons; et al. (November 2008). "The Battle of the Water Sensor Networks (BWSN): A Design Challenge for Engineers and Algorithms". Journal of Water Resources Planning and Management. 134 (6): 556–568. doi:10.1061/(asce)0733-9496(2008)134:6(556). ISSN 0733-9496. Wikidata Q58897775.
- Andreas Krause; Jure Leskovec; Carlos Guestrin; Jeanne VanBriesen; Christos Faloutsos (November 2008). "Efficient Sensor Placement Optimization for Securing Large Water Distribution Networks". Journal of Water Resources Planning and Management. 134 (6): 516–526. doi:10.1061/(asce)0733-9496(2008)134:6(516). ISSN 0733-9496. Wikidata Q60309442.
