= Pete Caringi =

Pete Caringi may refer to:

- Pete Caringi Jr. (born c. 1955), American soccer coach
- Pete Caringi III (born 1992), American soccer player
