= William H. Thomas (physician) =

American physician

- Born: October 13, 1959 (age 66); Tioga County, New York, US
- Other name: Bill Thomas
- Education: Cortland State
- Spouse: Jude Meyers Thomas
- Website: https://drbillthomas.org

William H. Thomas (born October 13, 1959), also known as Bill Thomas, is an American author, performer and authority on geriatric medicine and eldercare from New York State. In 2014, Thomas organized a 25-city "non-fiction" theatrical tour to launch his book and to promote the documentary film Alive Inside. He is the founder of The Eden Alternative, a philosophy and program that de-institutionalized nursing homes in all 50 states and worldwide over the past 20 years. A self-described “Nursing Home Abolitionist,” he is also creator of Green House Project, a long-term care approach where nursing homes are torn down and replaced with small, home-like environments. In 2005, the Robert Wood Johnson Foundation announced a five-year $10 million grant that would result in the creation of Green House projects in all fifty states. As a professor at The Erickson School at UMBC, Thomas led development of the nation's first emergency department designed for older adults.

== Life ==
Born in Tioga County, Thomas wrote of his childhood in Nichols, New York, "I was surrounded by older relatives since the day I was born and thought of my grandmother's house as an extension, for a lack of a better word, of my own. I think that the most important thing I learned was that older relatives were valuable and esteemed members of the extended family. In fact, they were the glue that held the family together."

In 2008, the Wall Street Journal named Thomas' among the 12 most influential Americans shaping aging in the 21st century. U.S. News & World Report described Thomas as a revolutionary, "With his startling common-sense ideas and his ability to persuade others to take a risk, this creative and wildly exuberant 46-year-old country doctor has become something of a culture changer—reimagining how Americans will approach aging in the 21st century. And with 35 million Americans over 65—a number that will double by 2030--that takes a big imagination indeed."

In 2014, Thomas organized a "non-fiction theater" roadshow bus tour to 25 cities nationwide featuring spoken word, film, art and live music performances. Sponsored by AARP's Life Reimagined, the tour targeted members of the baby boom generation and offered new approaches to growth, aging, health and wellness based on Thomas' non-fiction book Second Wind: Navigating the Passage to a Slower, Deeper and More Connected Life. Performers included Thomas, TV personality Dr. Janet Taylor and Musicians for World Harmony founder Samite Mulondo. The tour featured an exclusive director's cut of the 2014 Sundance Audience Choice documentary film Alive Inside.

From 1991 to 2007, Thomas operated a small farm in Sherburne, New York, where he built a house powered entirely by wind and solar energy. He now resides in Ithaca, New York, with his wife, Judith Meyers-Thomas, three sons, and one daughter. Thomas and his wife had two daughters with Ohtahara syndrome, a severe seizure disorder. Their daughter Hannah died in March 2015 at the age of 17.

== Medicine ==
Thomas attended the State University College at Cortland, where he earned a B.S. in Biology, summa cum laude, in 1982. While in college, he ran successfully for the presidency of the college's Student Association and unsuccessfully for mayor of the city of Cortland. Thomas graduated from Harvard Medical School (1986), where he was a founding editor of Murmurs, a quarterly journal of opinion. Thomas went on to graduate medical training in the Highland Hospital/University of Rochester Family Medicine Residency, where he was selected by the Mead Johnson Foundation as one of the top Family Medicine residents in the country. Though he planned on a career in emergency medicine, a part-time position as the medical director of a small rural nursing home in New Berlin, New York, turned into a full-time and lifelong passion for improving the well-being of older people. Thomas added a Certificate in Geriatrics in 1994 and opened a geriatric medical practice that grew to become a multi-physician group. Although he left full-time medical practice in 2004, he continues to lecture at the SUNY Health Science Center's Clinical Campus in Binghamton. In 2007, he was appointed as Professor of Aging Studies and Distinguished Fellow at UMBC's Erickson School in Baltimore, MD.

== Long-term care reform ==
Thomas and his wife developed the Eden Alternative in the early 1990s as a philosophy to deinstitutionalize long-term care facilities by alleviating the "three plagues" of boredom, helplessness, and loneliness. The Eden Alternative put forward a critique of the status quo in long-term care and offered a creative way to “change the culture” of nursing homes by bringing growth and laughter into the lives of elders. The philosophy called for fundamental changes in the relationship between staff and management and introduced pets, gardens and children to nursing homes. Thomas founded the Eden Alternative non-profit organization in 1994, which has grown to include affiliates in Japan, Australia, Scandinavia, Europe, Canada and the United Kingdom as well as the fifty states. Dr. Thomas continues to serve as its president.

In spreading the Eden Alternative philosophy nationwide, Thomas said he saw that America's nursing home buildings were “aging faster than the people living inside them.” This led him to imagine a new approach to long-term that became known as the Green House. Supported by the Robert Wood Johnson Foundation, Dr. Thomas oversaw the construction of the nation's first Green Houses. In 2005, the Robert Wood Johnson Foundation announced a five-year ten million dollar grant to support the launch of Green House projects in all fifty states. In November, 2008, Senate Finance Committee Chair Max Baucus (D-MT) said the Green House model "has shown promise for both improving the quality of life and care in these settings," and should be piloted. ProviderMagazine.com in May 2010 called The Green House Project the "pinnacle" of culture change in long-term care.

In 2008, Thomas led a team of experts from the Erickson School of Aging Studies at UMBC to create the nation's first elder-friendly emergency department at Holy Cross Hospital in Silver Spring, Maryland. The separate ER was scientifically designed to reduce anxiety, confusion and the risk of falling.

Thomas received the 12th Annual Heinz Award for the Human Condition in 2006 for his contributions to long-term care: "With contagious enthusiasm and an unwavering vision, Dr. William Thomas has helped bring dignity, joy and love into an environment that has been too long lacking in these essential human qualities. As America continues to age, his transformation of our system of long-term care provides a timely prescription for the care of generations to come."

== Books ==
- Thomas, William H. (2018). Principia Senescentis. New York: Sana Publications. ISBN 978-0989601139.
- Thomas, William H. (2014). Second Wind: Navigating the Passage to a Slower, Deeper and More Connected Life. New York: Simon and Schuster. ISBN 978-1451667578.
- Thomas, William H. (2004) [1999]. What Are Old People For?: How Elders Will Save the World. Acton, MA: VanderWyk & Burnham. ISBN 1-889242-20-9.
- Thomas, William H. (2006). In the Arms of Elders: A Parable of Wise Leadership and Community Building. Acton, MA: VanderWyk & Burnham. ISBN 1-889242-10-1.
- Thomas, William H. (1994). The Eden Alternative: Nature, Hope and Nursing Homes. New York: Eden Alternative Foundation. OCLC 609459874.
- Thomas, William H. (1996). Life worth living : how someone you love can still enjoy life in a nursing home : the Eden alternative in action. Acton, MA: VanderWyk & Burnham. ISBN 0-9641089-6-8.

== Awards ==
- AARP Visiting Scholar
- Ashoka North American Fellow
- Chief Wellness Officer, Holiday Retirement
- America's Award
- 12th Heinz Award for the Human Condition
- One of America's Best Leaders (Kennedy School Government)
- AAHSA Distinguished Service Award
- AHCA Public Service Award
- Giraffe Award
