= Rudy Gay =

American basketball player (born 1986)

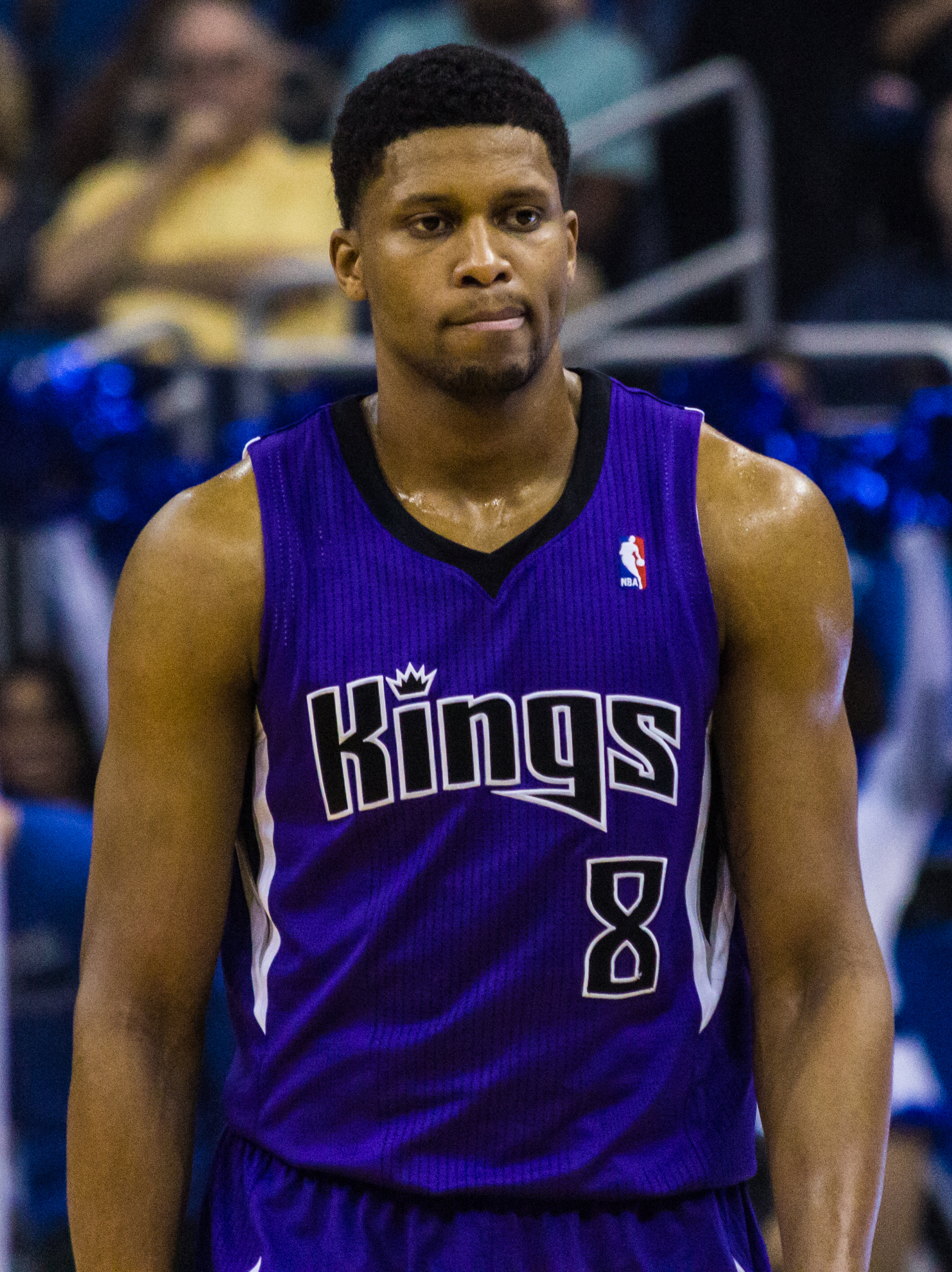
- Gay with the Sacramento Kings in 2013

Personal information
- Born: August 17, 1986 (age 40) New York City, New York, U.S.
- Listed height: 6 ft 8 in (2.03 m)
- Listed weight: 250 lb (113 kg)

Career information
- High school: Eastern Technical (Essex, Maryland); Archbishop Spalding (Severn, Maryland)
- College: UConn (2004–2006)
- NBA draft: 2006: 1st round, 8th overall pick
- Drafted by: Houston Rockets
- Playing career: 2006–2023
- Position: Small forward / power forward
- Number: 8, 22

Career history
- 2006–2013: Memphis Grizzlies
- 2013: Toronto Raptors
- 2013–2017: Sacramento Kings
- 2017–2021: San Antonio Spurs
- 2021–2023: Utah Jazz

Career highlights
- NBA All-Rookie First Team (2007); Consensus second-team All-American (2006); First-team All-Big East (2006); Big East Rookie of the Year (2005); Big East All-Rookie Team (2005); First-team Parade All-American (2004); McDonald's All-American (2004)

Career statistics
- Points: 17,642 (15.8 ppg)
- Rebounds: 6,283 (5.6 rpg)
- Assists: 2,280 (2.0 apg)
- Stats at NBA.com
- Stats at Basketball Reference
Medals
Men's basketball
Representing United States
FIBA World Cup
Gold medal – first place	2010 Turkey	Team
Gold medal – first place	2014 Spain	Team

Rudy Carlton Gay Jr. (born August 17, 1986) is an American former professional basketball player. A forward, he played college basketball for the UConn Huskies before being selected eighth overall in the 2006 NBA draft by the Houston Rockets, but was traded to the Memphis Grizzlies days later. He was named to the 2007 All-Rookie First Team.

== Early life ==
Born in Brooklyn, New York, to Rae Gay and Rudy Gay Sr., former lead singer of the R&B group Ace Spectrum and band director for The Stylistics, Gay began playing competitive recreational basketball at the age of 12 in his hometown of Dundalk, Maryland. At the age of 14, Gay began playing for the nationally known Cecil-Kirk AAU program under coach Anthony Lewis.

Gay played his first two years of high school basketball at Baltimore County's Eastern Technical High School, a magnet school in Essex. He played varsity basketball both years. In his sophomore season at Eastern Tech, the Mavericks earned their first and only trip to College Park for the state semi-finals. Although Eastern Tech was a Blue Ribbon academic institution, Gay's parents were concerned about his college preparation. He began his junior year with Eastern Tech, but in September 2002, he transferred to Archbishop Spalding in Severn. This prompted the Maryland Interscholastic Athletic Association to review its transfer rules. He began playing basketball for Spalding as a junior in 2002–03, earning first-team All-Baltimore Catholic League honors as a junior and senior, and was also honored as the Baltimore Sun's co-player of the year as a senior. He was the Washington Post All-Met Basketball Player of the Year, a McDonald's All-American, and a Parade first-team All-American in his senior year after averaging 21.2 points, 9.2 rebounds and 3.7 blocks per game. Considered a five-star recruit by Rivals.com, Gay was listed as the No. 2 small forward and the No. 5 player in the nation in 2004.

=== College recruitment ===
Gay's college recruitment and decision to attend the University of Connecticut over the University of Maryland were controversial. Gay had expressed a desire to attend Maryland and said that he grew up rooting for the team, but he ultimately chose UConn. Because of the heavy involvement of an AAU coach and a high school coach, there was the appearance of impropriety, although no NCAA recruiting violations were discovered. The NCAA adopted a new scheduling rule after UConn paid $25,000 to schedule a game against the Beltway Ballers, an ad hoc AAU team that consisted of Gay's former teammates. Although it violated no standing rule at the time, media observers and Connecticut staff considered it directly connected to the recruitment. According to individuals close to Maryland head coach Gary Williams, the recruitment demonstrated that rule-bending is often necessary to secure highly touted players, which Williams said he was unwilling to do, even at the expense of recruiting.

== College career ==
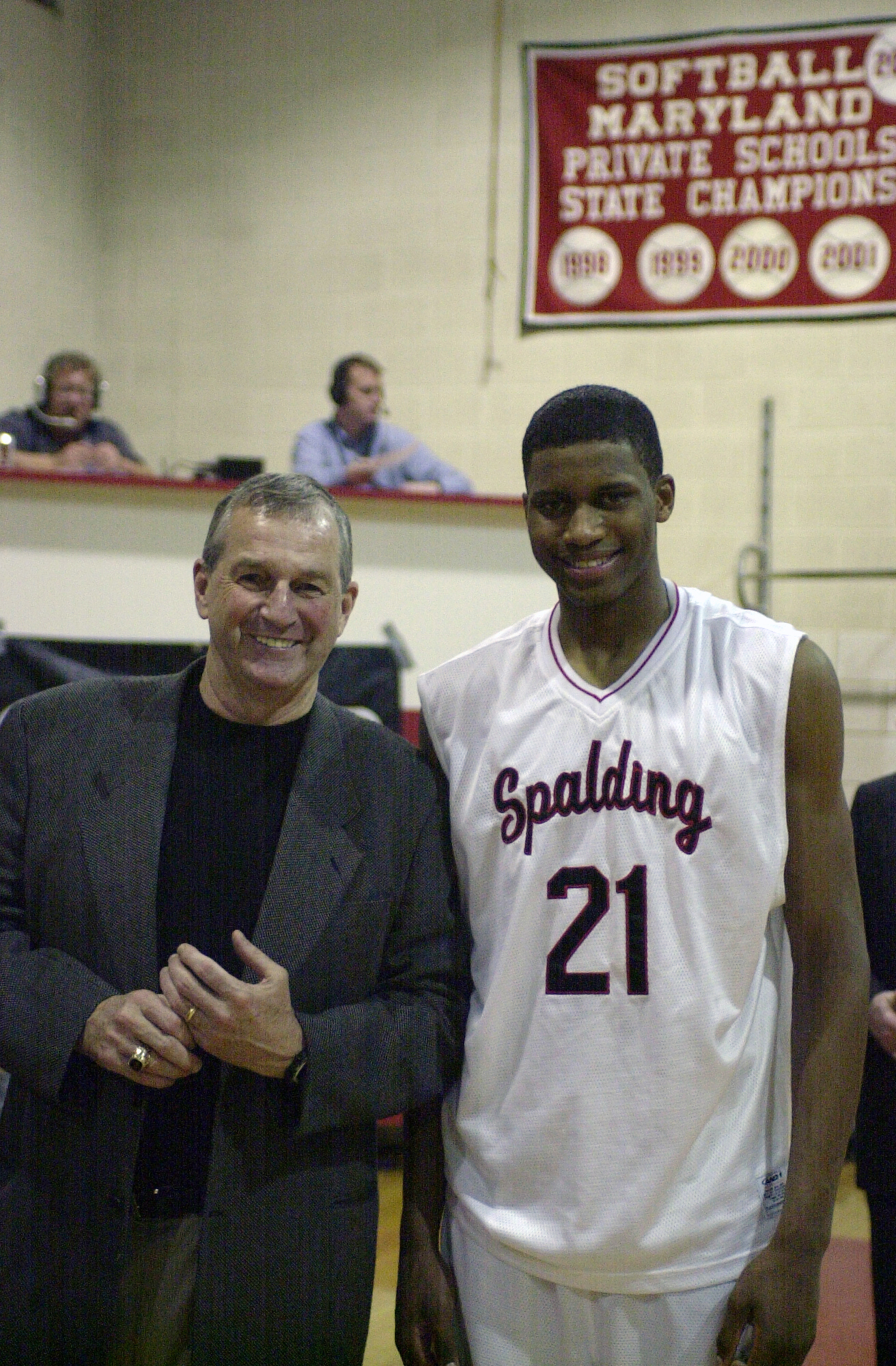
Gay with UConn coach Jim Calhoun in 2003

As a freshman at Connecticut in 2004–05, Gay was a co-winner (with Jeff Green of Georgetown) of the Big East Conference Rookie of the Year award after averaging 11.8 points, 5.4 rebounds and 1.5 assists on .462 shooting in 28.8 minutes in 31 games. He was a unanimous Big East All-Rookie Team selection, was named National Freshman of the Year by The Sporting News, and earned Big East Rookie of the Week honors five times.

In the summer of 2005, Gay played for United States' Men's Under-21 World Championship Team. He averaged 10.5 points and 5.5 rebounds per game over the tournament.

Before his sophomore season began, Gay was nominated as Big East Preseason Player of the Year, along with Syracuse guard Gerry McNamara. After the season concluded, Gay was one of four division one college players nominated for the Naismith College Player of the Year Award (along with JJ Redick, Adam Morrison and Allan Ray). Also, he was a unanimous selection to the First-team All-Big East. He led the Huskies in scoring (15.2 points) while averaging 6.4 rebounds, 2.1 assists, and 30.8 minutes in 33 games as a sophomore. He was named first-team All-America by the National Association of Basketball Coaches (NABC) and was named to the 2006 Washington, D.C. Regional All-Tournament Team. He scored a career-high 28 points on November 21, 2005, against Arkansas. Gay led the Huskies to a 30–3 record and finished his college career with 20 points and six rebounds in a career-high 42 minutes in an NCAA Elite Eight loss to George Mason on March 26.

On April 24, 2006, Gay declared for the 2006 NBA draft.

In February 2012, Gay was inducted into the "Huskies of Honor".

== Professional career ==
=== Memphis Grizzlies (2006–2013) ===
Gay was selected with the eighth overall pick in the 2006 NBA draft by the Houston Rockets, who then traded him and Stromile Swift to the Memphis Grizzlies in exchange for Shane Battier on July 12. Gay immediately signed his rookie scale contract with the Grizzlies upon being acquired by the team. Gay averaged 10.8 points, 4.5 rebounds, and 27.0 minutes in 78 games (43 starts) as a rookie. He earned NBA Rookie of the Month honors for November 2006, and went on to be selected to the 2006–07 All-Rookie First Team after placing fourth among first-year players in scoring, sixth in rebounding, fifth in steals (0.91), third in blocks (0.95), and fourth in minutes. He also finished third in the balloting for the 2006–07 Rookie of the Year Award behind winner Brandon Roy and runner-up Andrea Bargnani.

In 2007–08, Gay's second season, he set a Grizzlies' franchise record for points in a single season (1,632) and established a career-high for scoring average (20.1 points), becoming just the third player in franchise history to average 20 points per game (behind only Shareef Abdur-Rahim and Pau Gasol). He participated in the 2008 Rising Stars Slam Dunk Contest, and finished runner-up to Hedo Türkoğlu for the 2007–08 NBA Most Improved Player Award. After his invitation to the 2008 Slam Dunk Contest, Gay and YouTube teamed up for the Rudy Gay Slam Dunk Contest promotion, in which he asked fans to upload footage of their best dunks for him to attempt during the contest. During the contest, he performed a one-handed reverse clutch dunk in the first round, and during the second round, teammate Kyle Lowry alley-ooped the ball off the bar and from behind the backboard; Gay regathered and pulled off a windmill dunk. He ended with a score of 85 but did not advance to the second round.

In 2008–09, Gay recorded 18.9 points, 5.5 rebounds, 1.24 steals and 37.3 minutes in 79 games (78 starts). He made a baseline jumper as time expired in Memphis' home opener on October 31 against the Orlando Magic, giving the organization its first home-opening win since the 2000–01 season.

On December 13, 2009, Gay scored a career-high 41 points against the Miami Heat, tying Mike Miller's franchise record for points in a win. In 2009–10, he ranked second on the team in scoring (19.6 points) in 39.7 minutes in 80 games (all starts). He finished the season tied for 18th in the NBA in scoring, 17th in steals and third in minutes.

On July 8, 2010, Gay re-signed with the Memphis Grizzlies to a five-year, $82 million contract. He emerged as one of the league's premier small forwards in 2010–11, posting career highs in seven major statistical categories before missing the final 23 regular-season games and all of the 2011 Playoffs due to a left shoulder subluxation sustained on February 15 against the Philadelphia 76ers. He recorded career highs for assists (2.8), steals (1.69), blocks (1.07), field goal percentage (.471), three-point field goal percentage (.396), free throw percentage (.805) and minutes (39.9). He also ranked second on the team in scoring (19.8 points) in 54 games (all starts). Gay watched from the sidelines as the Grizzlies defeated the top-seeded San Antonio Spurs in a first round upset before falling to the Oklahoma City Thunder in seven games in the Western Conference semi-finals.

Gay passed Shane Battier (523) as the Grizzlies' all-time leader in steals on February 2, 2012, against the Atlanta Hawks. In 2011–12, Gay led the Grizzlies in scoring (19.0 points) and minutes (37.3), and averaged a career-high in rebounding (6.4). He posted 2.3 assists and .455 shooting in 65 games (all starts) and ranked 17th in the NBA in scoring, 16th in steals (1.46), sixth in minutes, and seventh in dunks (110). He made his first postseason appearance in 2011–12, averaged a team-high 19.0 points, 6.6 rebounds and 1.4 assists on .421 shooting in 39.9 minutes in seven games against the Los Angeles Clippers in the first round of the 2012 Western Conference Playoffs.

=== Toronto Raptors (2013) ===
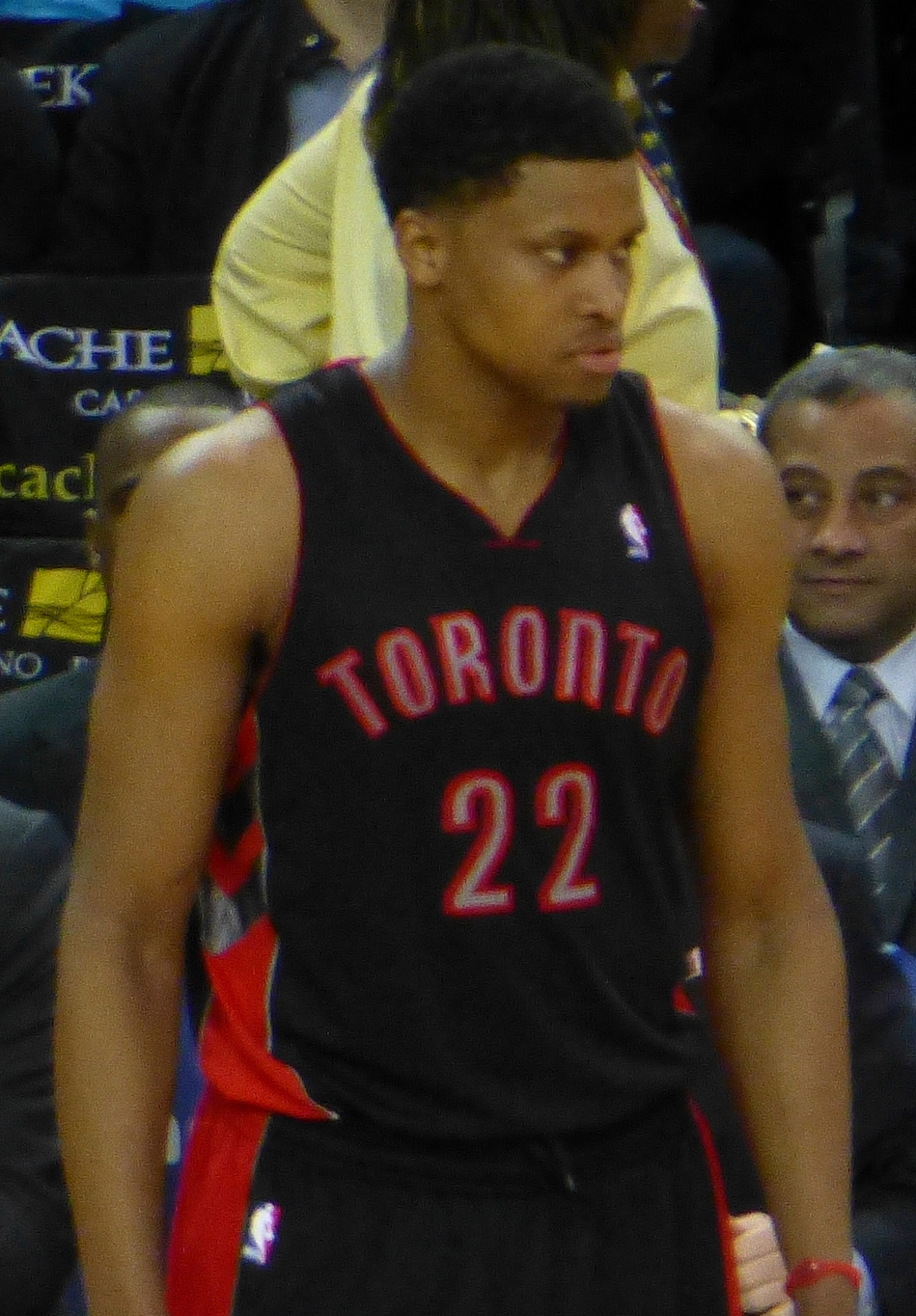
Gay with the Raptors in March 2013

On January 30, 2013, the Grizzlies traded Gay to the Toronto Raptors in a three-team deal that also included the Detroit Pistons. Gay set a franchise record by scoring 74 points in his first three games with the Raptors. The Raptors finished the 2012–13 season with a 34–48 win–loss record and missed the playoffs. He became the first player to lead two teams in scoring in the same season since Stephon Marbury in 2003–04. He averaged 19.5 points, 6.4 rebounds, 1.73 steals and 34.7 minutes in 33 games (32 starts) with Toronto.

=== Sacramento Kings (2013–2017) ===
On December 9, 2013, the Raptors traded Gay, along with Quincy Acy and Aaron Gray, to the Sacramento Kings in exchange for Greivis Vásquez, John Salmons, Chuck Hayes and Patrick Patterson. On January 22, 2014, he tied his career high of 41 points in the Kings' 114–97 win over the New Orleans Pelicans.

On June 22, 2014, Gay exercised his $19.3 million contract option with the Kings for the 2014–15 season. On October 31, 2014, Gay scored 40 points in a 103–94 win over the Portland Trail Blazers. On November 19, 2014, he signed a three-year, $40 million contract extension with the Kings. Gay appeared in just one of the Kings' final nine games of the 2014–15 season after experiencing headaches due to a concussion he received when he had a collision with his ex-teammate, Marc Gasol of the Memphis Grizzlies, on March 30. Gay had one of his best seasons in the NBA, averaging 21.1 points, 5.9 rebounds and 3.7 assists in 68 games.

On November 25, 2015, Gay scored a season-high 36 points in a 129–118 win over the Milwaukee Bucks. On December 15, 2015, he recorded 17 points, 13 rebounds, 3 assists, 1 block, and a career-high 6 steals in a 107–97 win over the Houston Rockets.

On January 18, 2017, Gay sustained a full rupture of his left Achilles tendon in the Kings' 106–100 loss to the Indiana Pacers and subsequently missed the remainder of the season.

=== San Antonio Spurs (2017–2021) ===
On July 6, 2017, Gay signed with the San Antonio Spurs. On December 28, Gay suffered a right heel injury and was subsequently ruled out for at least two weeks. He made 57 appearances (including six starts) for San Antonio during the 2017–18 NBA season, recording averages of 11.5 points, 5.1 rebounds, and 1.3 assists.

On July 11, 2018, Gay re-signed with the Spurs. On October 29, Gay scored 15 points, grabbed 11 rebounds, and recorded six steals in a 113–108 overtime win against the Dallas Mavericks. On December 5, Gay scored a season-high 31 points and grabbed seven rebounds during a 121–113 loss to the Los Angeles Lakers. Gay appeared in 69 games (starting 51) for the Spurs during the 2018–19 season, averaging 13.7 points, 6.8 rebounds, and 2.6 assists.

Gay made 67 appearances (including five starts) for San Antonio in the 2019–20 season, recording averages of 10.8 points, 5.4 rebounds, and 1.7 assists. He logged 63 appearances (one start) for the Spurs during the 2021–22 season, averaging 11.4 points, 4.8 rebounds, and 1.4 assists.

=== Utah Jazz (2021–2023) ===
On August 6, 2021, Gay signed with the Utah Jazz. On December 29, Gay scored 21 points off the bench during a 120–105 win against the Portland Trail Blazers. He made 55 appearances (including one start) for the team during the 2021–22 NBA season, recording averages of 8.1 points, 4.4 rebounds, and 1.0 assists.

Gay made 56 appearances off of the bench for the Jazz during the 2022–23 season, logging averages of 5.2 points, 2.9 rebounds, and 1.0 assists.

On July 7, 2023, Gay and a conditional 2026 second-round pick were traded to the Atlanta Hawks for John Collins. On July 12, he was traded once again to the Oklahoma City Thunder alongside TyTy Washington, Usman Garuba and a 2026 2nd round pick in exchange for Patty Mills. On July 20, Gay was waived by the Thunder. On September 28, Gay signed a one-year contract with the Golden State Warriors. Gay was waived by the Warriors on October 20 as one of their final preseason roster moves.

=== Retirement ===
On October 29, 2024, Gay announced his retirement from basketball through an article on The Players' Tribune.

== National team career ==
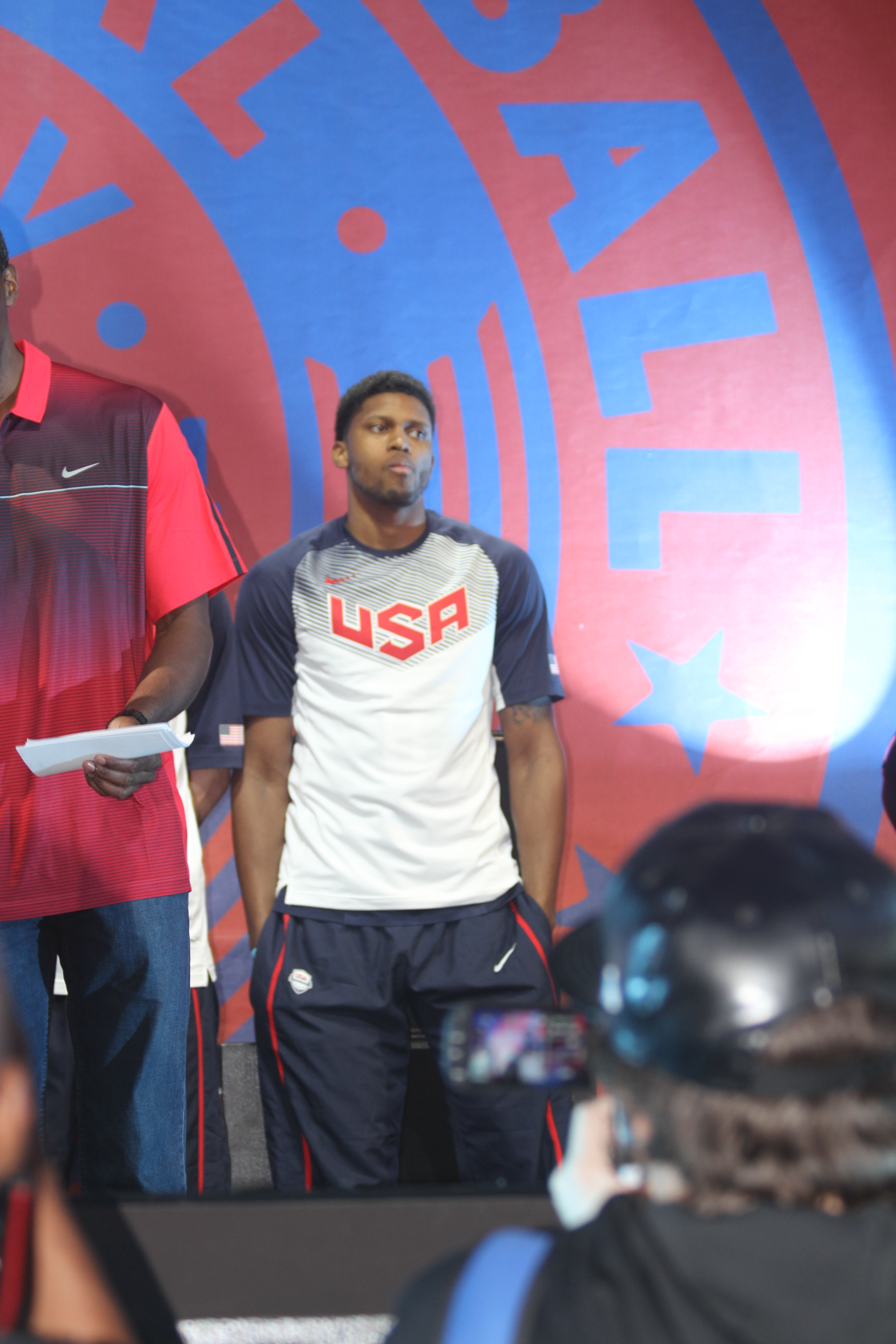
Gay with Team USA in 2014

In 2010, Gay helped the United States win its first FIBA World Championship gold medal since 1994, averaging 7.0 points, 2.9 rebounds and 1.0 steals in 13.4 minutes in nine games for the undefeated Americans. He was also a member of the national team in 2014 that collected the gold medal at the FIBA Basketball World Cup after another undefeated campaign.

== Career statistics ==
Legend
GP	Games played	GS	Games started	MPG	Minutes per game
FG%	Field goal percentage	3P%	3-point field goal percentage	FT%	Free throw percentage
RPG	Rebounds per game	APG	Assists per game	SPG	Steals per game
BPG	Blocks per game	PPG	Points per game	**Bold**	Career high

=== NBA ===
==== Regular season ====
Year	Team	GP	GS	MPG	FG%	3P%	FT%	RPG	APG	SPG	BPG	PPG
2006–07	Memphis	78	43	27.0	.422	.364	.727	4.5	1.3	.9	.9	10.8
2007–08	Memphis	**81**	**81**	37.0	.461	.346	.785	6.2	2.0	1.4	1.0	20.1
2008–09	Memphis	79	78	37.3	.453	.351	.767	5.5	1.7	1.2	.7	18.9
2009–10	Memphis	80	80	39.7	.466	.327	.752	5.9	1.9	1.5	.8	19.6
2010–11	Memphis	54	54	**39.9**	.471	.396	.805	6.2	2.8	1.7	1.1	19.8
2011–12	Memphis	65	65	37.3	.455	.312	.791	6.4	2.3	1.5	.8	19.0
2012–13	Memphis	42	42	36.7	.408	.310	.776	5.9	2.6	1.3	.7	17.2
2012–13	Toronto	33	32	34.7	.425	.336	.856	6.4	2.8	**1.7**	.7	19.5
2013–14	Toronto	18	18	35.5	.388	.373	.773	**7.4**	2.2	1.6	**1.3**	19.4
2013–14	Sacramento	55	55	34.4	.482	.312	.836	5.5	3.1	1.2	.6	20.1
2014–15	Sacramento	68	67	35.4	.455	.359	.858	5.9	**3.7**	1.0	.6	**21.1**
2015–16	Sacramento	70	70	34.0	.463	.344	.780	6.5	1.7	1.4	.7	17.2
2016–17	Sacramento	30	30	33.8	.455	.372	.855	6.3	2.7	1.5	.9	18.7
2017–18	San Antonio	57	6	21.6	.471	.314	.772	5.1	1.3	.8	.7	11.5
2018–19	San Antonio	69	51	26.7	**.504**	**.402**	.816	6.8	2.6	.8	.5	13.7
2019–20	San Antonio	67	5	21.8	.466	.336	**.882**	5.4	1.7	.5	.5	10.8
2020–21	San Antonio	63	1	21.6	.420	.381	.804	4.8	1.4	.7	.6	11.4
2021–22	Utah	55	1	18.9	.414	.345	.785	4.4	1.0	.5	.3	8.1
2022–23	Utah	56	0	14.6	.380	.254	.857	2.9	1.0	.3	.3	5.2
Career		1,120	779	30.9	.452	.346	.799	5.6	2.0	1.1	.7	15.8

==== Playoffs ====
Year	Team	GP	GS	MPG	FG%	3P%	FT%	RPG	APG	SPG	BPG	PPG
2012	Memphis	**7**	**7**	**39.9**	**.421**	.211	**.825**	6.6	1.4	1.3	.3	**19.0**
2018	San Antonio	5	4	32.0	.400	.222	.556	5.6	**2.2**	**1.6**	.2	12.2
2019	San Antonio	**7**	0	25.6	.400	**.421**	.824	**7.1**	1.7	.4	**.7**	11.1
Career		19	11	32.5	.410	.286	.788	6.5	1.7	1.1	.4	14.3

=== College ===
Year	Team	GP	GS	MPG	FG%	3P%	FT%	RPG	APG	SPG	BPG	PPG
2004–05	Connecticut	31	26	28.8	**.462**	**.467**	.708	5.4	1.5	.8	**1.9**	11.8
2005–06	Connecticut	**33**	**33**	**30.8**	.461	.318	**.732**	**6.4**	**2.1**	**1.8**	1.6	**15.2**
Career		64	59	29.8	.461	.378	.721	5.9	1.8	1.3	1.7	13.6

== Personal life ==
In 2010, Gay was named an ambassador for the Hoops for St. Jude fundraising program for St. Jude Children's Research Hospital in Memphis and donated $20,000 to the program, which allowed donors to pledge a set amount of dollars for each point scored by Gay and other participating NBA players.

In April 2010, Gay was awarded the NBA Cares Community Assist Award for March in recognition of his service to the Memphis community, particularly his ongoing support of St. Jude Children's Research Hospital in Memphis. As a result, a $5,000 donation was given by the NBA on behalf of Gay to support St. Jude Children's Research Hospital. Gay, who wore number 22 with Memphis, personally donated $22,222.00 to the hospital.

In 2013, Gay married his high school girlfriend, Ecko Wray. The couple have two children together, Clint & Dean. He also has a son from a previous relationship. Gay is the second cousin of NBA player Bub Carrington.
