= Danai Koutra =

Greek and American computer scientist

Danai Koutra is a Greek and American computer scientist. Her research applies machine learning and data mining to graph-theoretic data, including the use of graph neural networks and graph matching, and applications to anomaly detection and automatic summarization. She is an associate professor in the Computer Science and Engineering Division at the University of Michigan, and head of the Graph Exploration and Mining at Scale (GEMS) Lab, with an additional affiliation in the Gilbert S. Omenn Department of Computational Medicine and Bioinformatics.

== Education and career ==
Koutra has a 2010 degree in electrical and computer engineering from the National Technical University of Athens. She completed a Ph.D. at Carnegie Mellon University in 2015. Her dissertation, Exploring and Making Sense of Large Graphs, was supervised by Christos Faloutsos.

She became an assistant professor at the University of Michigan in 2015, and was named as a Morris Wellman Faculty Development Professor in 2020.

== Recognition ==
Koutra's doctoral dissertation won the 2016 SIGKDD Doctoral Dissertation Award. She was one of two 2020 SIGKDD Rising Star Award winners. A paper by Koutra from the 2013 IEEE International Conference on Data Mining (ICDM), "BIG-ALIGN: Fast Bipartite Graph Alignment" (with Hanghang Tong and David M. Lubensky) was given the 2022 ICDM 10-Year Highest-Impact Paper Award. At the 2023 ICDM in Shanghai, she was awarded the ICDM Tao Li Award. In 2024 she received the IBM Early Career Data Mining Research Award of the Society for Industrial and Applied Mathematics. She was a 2025 recipient of the Presidential Early Career Award for Scientists and Engineers.
