= Retriever Soccer Park =

University of Maryland, Baltimore County venue for intercollegiate soccer

Coordinates: 39°15′10″N 76°42′52″W

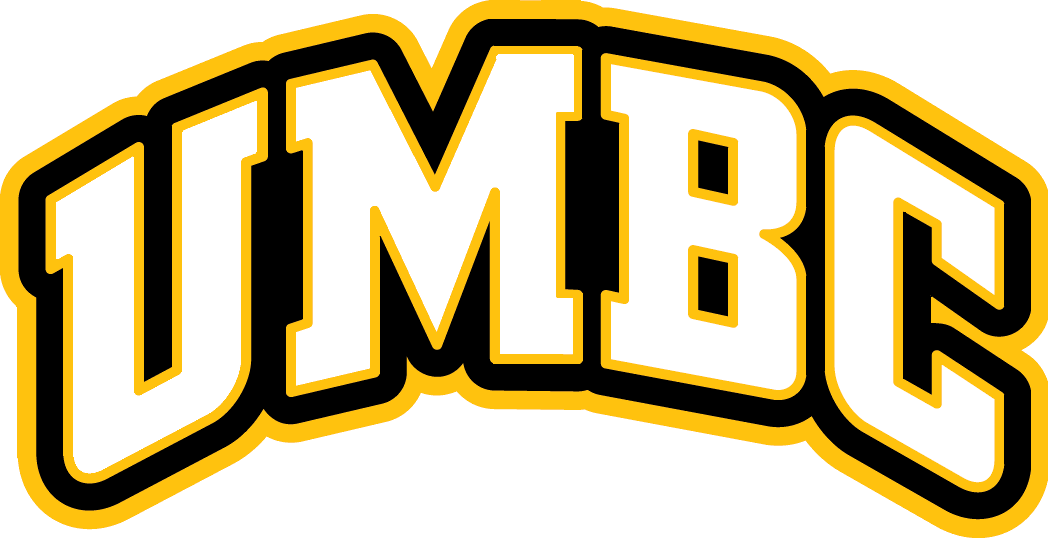

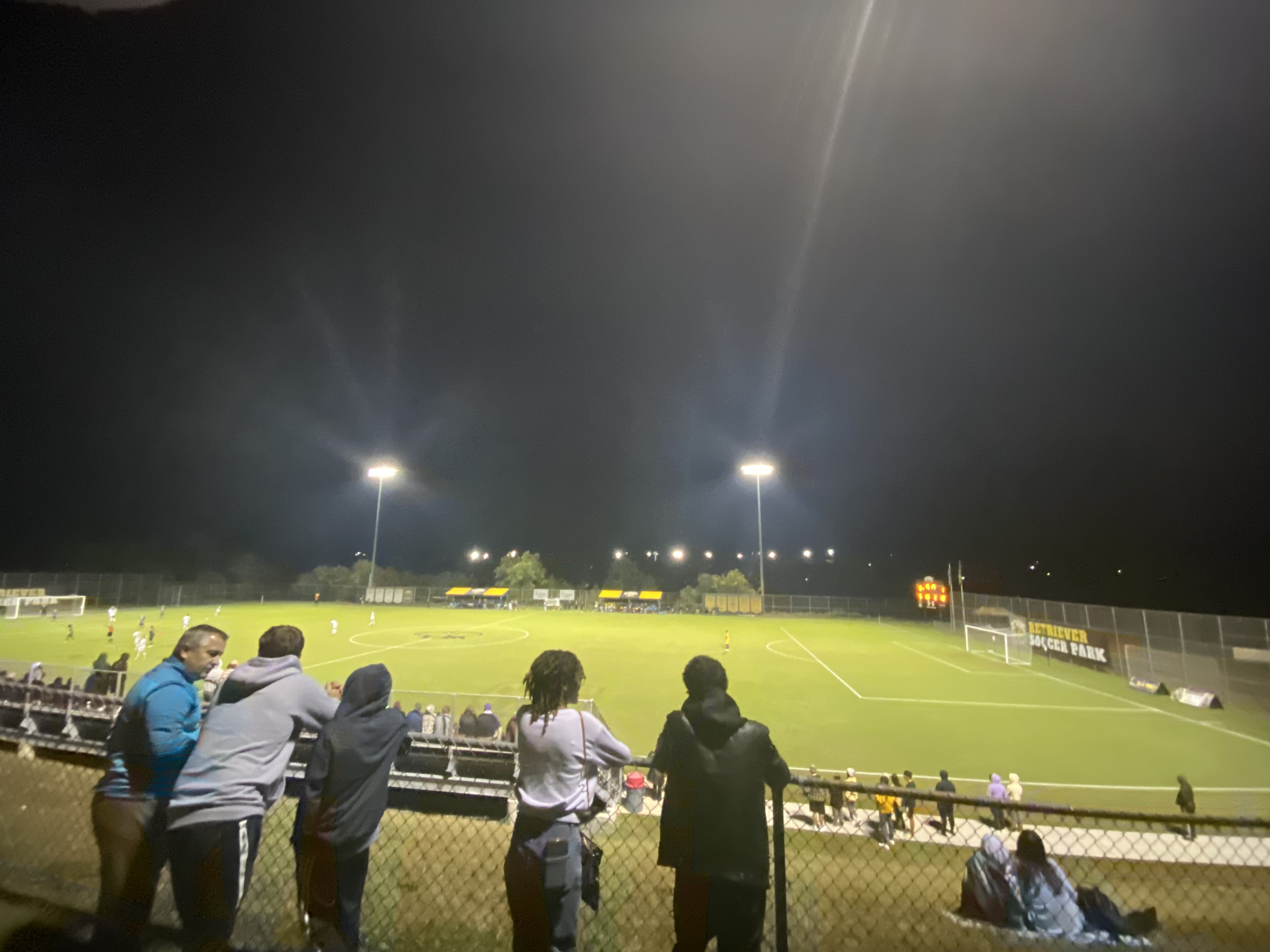
- View of the stadium in 2021
- Interactive map of Retriever Soccer Park
- Address: UMBC 5523 Research Park; Baltimore, MD; United States
- Location: Stadium Road
- Owner: University of Maryland
- Operator: University of Maryland, Baltimore County
- Capacity: 1,500
- Surface: Bermuda grass
- Field size: 120-yard x 70-yard
- Current use: College soccer

Construction
- Opened: 1998; 28 years ago
- Renovated: 2006

Tenants
- UMBC Retrievers (NCAA) teams: men's and women's soccer

Website
- umbcretrievers.com/soccerpark

The Retriever Soccer Park is a soccer-specific stadium and one of the University of Maryland, Baltimore County's athletic fields. It is located in the southeastern section of the campus next to the UMBC Stadium, the Department of Facilities Management, and bordered by Shelbourne Road in Arbutus, Maryland. The stadium was completed in the fall of 1998 and included a 120-yard by 70-yard field, press box, automated electronic scoreboard display, and concessions area.

The field was renovated in 2006, with permanent bleachers have been added to seat 1,500 spectators as well as the Bermuda grass and irrigation system installations. The Retriever Soccer Park can be accessed off of Hilltop Circle by Stadium Road, and is served by the Stadium Lot (formerly Lot 17), which can hold 900 vehicles.
