= Ace Spectrum =

American soul musical group

- Origin: New York City, New York, U.S.
- Genres: Soul; R&B; disco
- Years active: 1966–76
- Label: Atlantic
- Past members: Rudy Gay; Elliot Isaac; Aubrey Johnson; Henry Zant

Ace Spectrum was an American R&B, soul and disco musical group that was popular in the mid-1970s.

== History ==
Based in New York City, the group consisted of Rudy Gay Sr., Elliot Isaac, Henry "Easy" Zant, Aubrey "Troy" Johnson, and, on their final album, Frederick G. Duff and Lawrence Coley. Zant, also known as Edward "Easy" Zant, was not only a member but he also managed the group. Gay, Isaac, Zant and Johnson began collaboration as a group in 1966. "Don't Send Nobody Else", written by Ashford & Simpson, was their biggest single. From their Tony Silvester-produced debut album, it peaked at number 57 on Billboard's Hot 100 while finding its way to the top 20 on the R&B Singles chart. Their single "Keep Holdin' On" was released as a 12-inch single, and heavily promoted by their record label at disco clubs. Another single "Live and Learn" with lead vocals by Frederick, reached position 35 on the Dance Music/Club Play Singles chart. Their first two albums saw chart action. Inner Spectrum attained position 28 on the R&B Albums chart, and Low Rent Rendezvous saw action on the Billboard Top LPs & Tape chart (#138), as well as on R&B Albums (#35). Patrick Adams produced and arranged the group's 1976 recordings, but further success eluded them.

== Style and influence ==
Ace Spectrum never developed into a huge hitmaker, although Allmusic considers it a "decent soul ensemble." Their recordings have generated considerable interest among Northern Soul collectors. The 1975 release "Keep Holding On" was one of the first 12-inch singles. Musically, the group employed a mix of up-tempo and down-tempo songs. The group eschewed the "high-voice technique" that was common for the era. Backing strings were important to the group's sound. Billboard commented positively about group, stating it deserved "as much exposure as possible." Rudy Gay Sr., a member of Iota Phi Theta fraternity, later went on to both father the famous basketball player and become music director for The Stylistics.

== Discography ==
=== Singles ===
List of singles, with selected chart positions, showing other relevant details
Single	Year	Label	Chart positions			Album
Single	Year	Label	US Pop	US R&B	US Dance	Album
"Don't Send Nobody Else" b/w "Don't Let Me Be Lonely Tonight"	1974	Atlantic 3012	57	20	—	Inner Spectrum
"Trust Me" b/w "I Just Want to Spend the Night With You"	1975	Atlantic 3281	—	—	—	Low Rent Rendezvous
"Keep Holding On" b/w "Without You"	1975	Atlantic 3296	—	—	—	Low Rent Rendezvous
"Live and Learn" b/w "Just Like in the Movies"	1976	Atlantic 3353	—	—	35	Just Like in the Movies

=== Studio albums ===
List of studio albums, showing all relevant details
Title	Album details	Peak chart positions	
Title	Album details	US Pop	US R&B
Inner Spectrum	Released: 1974; Label: Atlantic; Formats: LP, vinyl, CD; Catalogue number: SD 7299	209	28
Low Rent Rendezvous	Released: 1975; Label: Atlantic; Formats: LP, vinyl, CD; Catalogue number: SD 18143	138	35
Just Like in the Movies	Released: 1976; Label: Atlantic; Formats: LP, vinyl, CD; Catalogue number: SD 18185	—	—
