= Revolutionary Association of the Women of Afghanistan =

Afghan women's organization founded in 1977

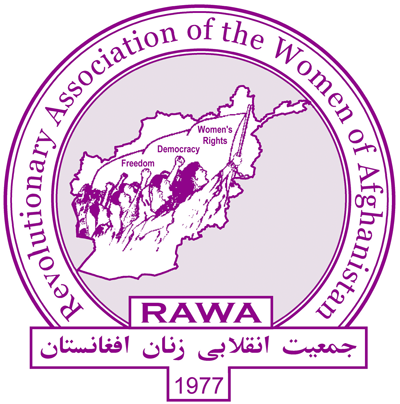
- Founded: 1977
- Founder: Meena Keshwar Kamal
- Type: Women's organization
- Purpose: Promoting women's rights and secular democracy
- Location: Quetta, Pakistan
- Region served: Pakistan and Afghanistan
- Website: www.rawa.org

The Revolutionary Association of the Women of Afghanistan (RAWA; Persian: جمعیت انقلابی زنان افغانستان, Jamʿiyat-e Inqilābi-ye Zanān-e Afghānistān, Pashto: د افغانستان د ښڅو انقلابی جمعیت, romanized: Da Afghānistān da khachcho Inqilābi Jamiat) is a women's organization originally based in Kabul, Afghanistan, that promotes women's rights and secular democracy. It was founded in 1977 by Meena Keshwar Kamal, an Afghan student activist who was assassinated in February 1987 for her political activities. The group, which supports non-violent strategies, had its initial office in Kabul, Afghanistan, but then moved to Pakistan in the early 1980s.

The organization aims to involve women of Afghanistan in both political and social activities aimed at acquiring human rights for women and continuing the struggle against the government of Afghanistan based on democratic and secular, not fundamentalist principles, in which women can participate fully. RAWA also strives for multilateral disarmament. Since 1977, the group has opposed every Afghan government system: the Democratic Republic of Afghanistan, the Islamic State of Afghanistan, the Islamic Emirate of Afghanistan (1996–2001), the Islamic Republic of Afghanistan (2001–2021), and the Islamic Emirate of Afghanistan (from 2021).

== Founder ==
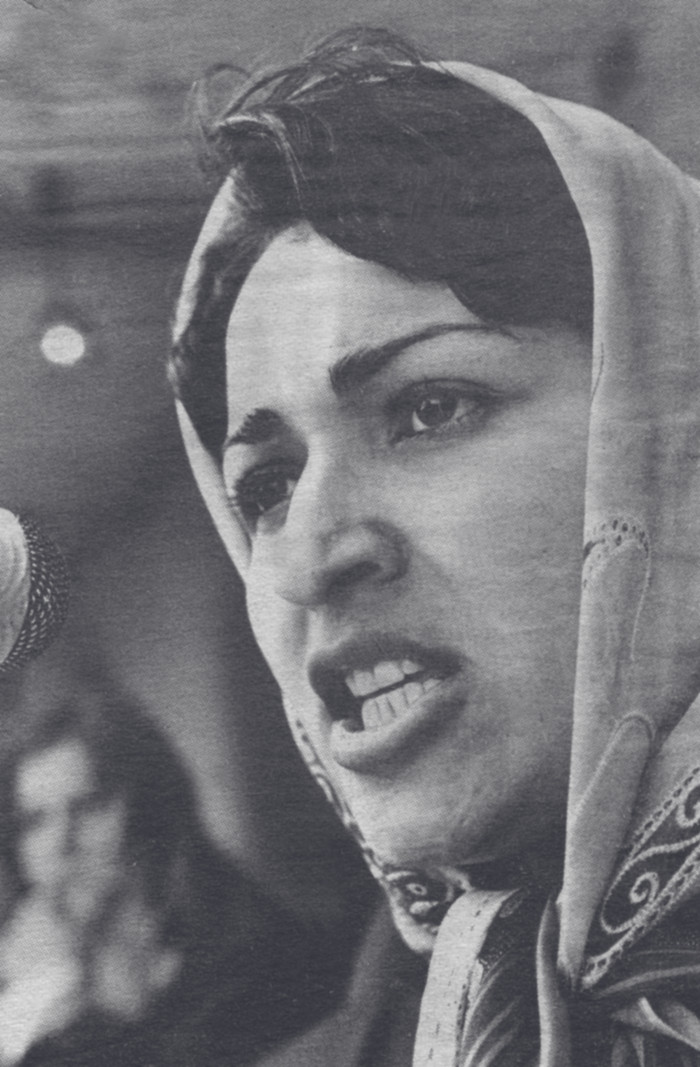
Meena Keshwar Kamal, founder of RAWA

RAWA was founded in 1977 by a group of Afghan women led by Meena Keshwar Kamal. At age 21, she laid the foundations of RAWA through her work educating women. In 1979, Kamal began a campaign against the Soviet occupation and the Soviet-supported government of Afghanistan. In 1981, she launched a bilingual magazine Payam-e-Zan (Women's Message). In the same year, she visited France for the French Socialist Party Congress. She also established schools for Afghan refugee children, hospitals and handicraft centers for refugee women in Pakistan. Her activities and views, as well as her work against the government and religious fundamentalists led to her assassination on February 4, 1987.

== Early activities ==
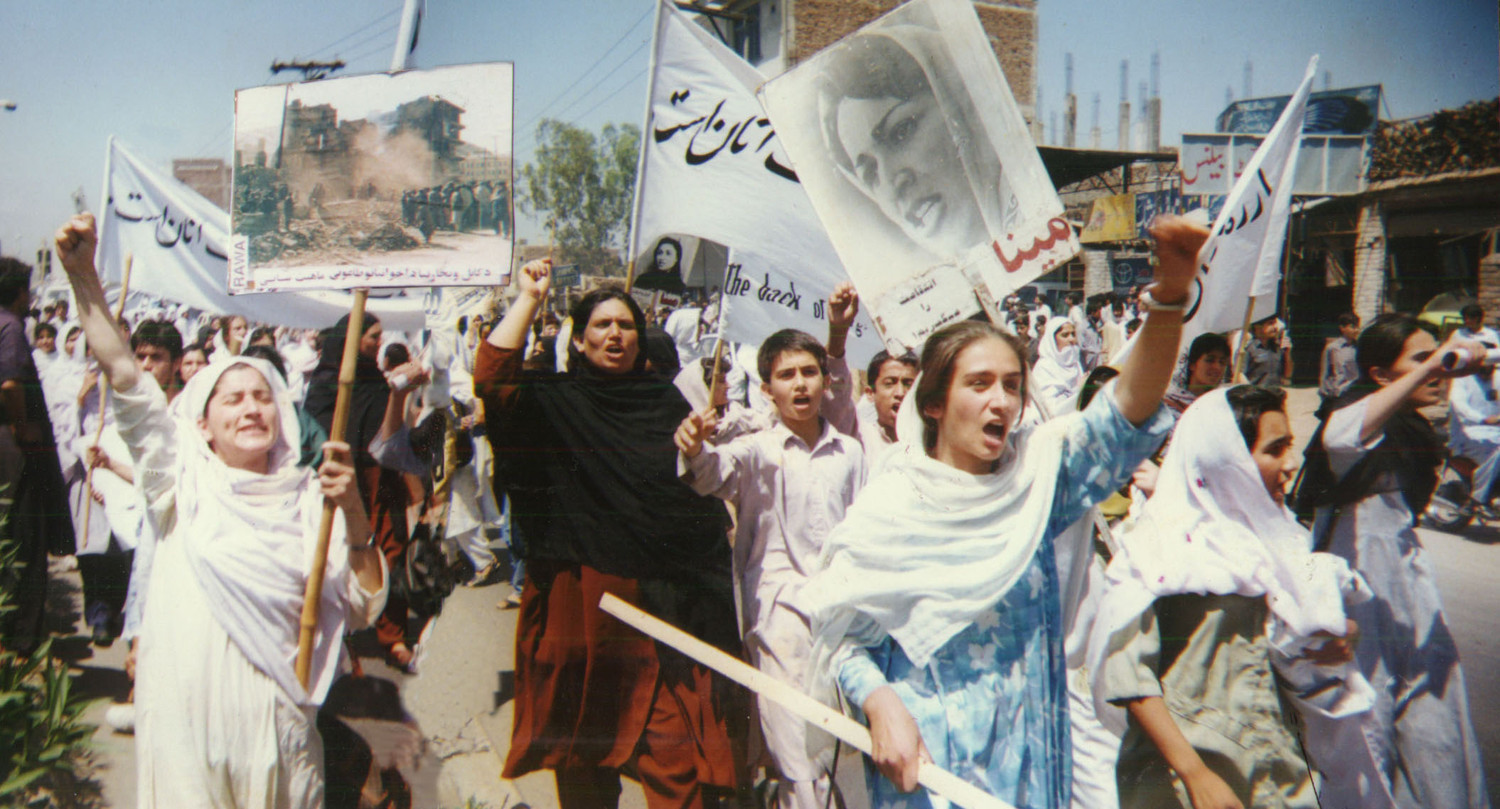
A protest of RAWA in Peshawar, Pakistan on April 28, 1998

Much of RAWA's efforts in the 1990s involved holding seminars and press conferences and other fund-raising activities in Pakistan. RAWA also created secret schools, orphanages, nursing courses, and handicraft centers for women and girls in Pakistan and Afghanistan. They secretly filmed women being beaten in the street in Afghanistan by the Mutaween religious police, and being executed. RAWA activities were forbidden by both the Taliban and the United Islamic Front ("Northern Alliance"), but they persisted, and even publicised their work in publications like Payam-e-Zan.

== Following the 2001 invasion ==
RAWA was highly critical of the NATO intervention that began in 2001 because of the high rate of casualties among the civilian population. In 2001, the organization went so far as to threaten to sue United States government for unauthorized use of four photos from their website that were used in propaganda handbills dropped on various cities in Afghanistan during the 2001–2021 United States military presence.

After the defeat of the Taliban government, RAWA warned that the NATO-allied Afghan forces were just as fundamentalist and dangerous as the Taliban. They charged that the government led by President Hamid Karzai lacked support in most areas of Afghanistan, and that fundamentalists were enforcing laws unfairly treating women as they were under the Taliban. These claims were supported by media reports about the Herat government of Ismail Khan, who created a Committee for the Propagation of Virtue and the Prevention of Vice that forced women to obey strict dress and behavior codes, as well as many reports by Human Rights Watch. One report released by Human Rights Watch (HRW) in 2012 described a situation where women were punished by the judicial system for attempting to escape from domestic abuse and also occasionally for being victims of rape. HRW stated that Karzai wass "[u]nwilling or unable to take a consistent line against conservative forces within the country," and that the lack of improvement in the plight of women in Afghanistan after ten years was "shocking."

== Activities during the Islamic Republic ==
RAWA collects funds to support hospitals, schools and orphanages and still runs many projects in Pakistan and Afghanistan, including a project in conjunction with CharityHelp.org for orphan sponsorships. In 2020 RAWA restarted its mission inside Afghanistan and organized some of its events in Kabul. They have held events annually on International Women's Day since 2006.

On October 7, 2006, the Afghan Women's Mission (AWM) organized a fund-raising event for RAWA in Los Angeles, California. Eve Ensler was the chief guest and radio host Sonali Kolhatkar and Zoya, a member of RAWA, were among the speakers. "Zoya" is a pseudonym for an active member of RAWA's Foreign Committee who has traveled to many countries, including the United States, Spain and Germany. In 2003, she received international acclaim for her biography Zoya’s Story - An Afghan Woman's Battle for Freedom. In June 2008, Zoya testified to the Human Rights Commission of the German Parliament (Bundestag) to persuade the German government to withdraw its troops from Afghanistan.

In February 2012, the group commemorated the 25th anniversary of the death of RAWA founder Meena Keshwar Kamal with a gathering of women in Kabul.

== Under the Taliban ==
Following the American and coalition exit from Afghanistan in August 2021, the Taliban swiftly regained control of the country. The new regime reinstituted an old policy of denying women and girls access to schooling. RAWA has operated secret schools for women to subvert this policy.

== Recognition ==
RAWA has so far won 16 awards and certificates from around the world for its work for human rights and democracy. They include the sixth Asian Human Rights Award - 2001, the French Republic's Liberty, Equality, Fraternity Human Rights Prize, 2000, Emma Humphreys Memorial Prize 2001, Glamour Women of the Year 2001, 2001 SAIS-Novartis International Journalism Award from Johns Hopkins University, Certificate of Special Congressional Recognition from the U.S. Congress, 2004, Honorary Doctorate from University of Antwerp (Belgium) for outstanding non-academic achievements, and many other awards.

== Perspectives on RAWA ==
In the book With All Our Strength: The Revolutionary Association of the Women of Afghanistan by Anne Brodsky, a number of world-known writers and human rights activists share their views of RAWA. They include Arundhati Roy who says "Each of us needs a little RAWA"; Eve Ensler, author of The Vagina Monologues, who suggests that RAWA must stand as a model for every group working to end violence; Katha Pollitt, author of Subject to Debate: Sense and Dissents on Women, Politics, and Culture; Ahmed Rashid, author of Taliban and Jihad; and Asma Jahangir, Special Rapporteur of the United Nations and prominent Pakistani women's rights activist are two Pakistanis who write about RAWA and express their support.

== See also ==
- Gender roles in Afghanistan
- Solidarity Party of Afghanistan
- Taliban treatment of women
