= Eastern Technical High School =

Location
- 1100 Mace Avenue; Essex, Maryland 21221; United States; 39°19′31″N 76°28′22″W

Information
- Type: Magnet high school
- Motto: “Tech Yeah”
- Established: 1970
- Teaching staff: 66.80 (on an FTE basis)
- Grades: 9–12
- Enrolment: 1330 (2024–2025)
- Student to teacher ratio: 19.91
- Campus: Suburban
- Colors: Orange, white, black
- Mascot: Maverick
- Website: easterntechhs.bcps.org

Eastern Technical High School (ETHS) is a high school in Essex, Maryland, United States. It was designated as a Maryland Blue Ribbon High School in 1997, 2009, and 2010, a National Blue Ribbon High School in 2010, and a USDE New American High School in 1999. The school is commonly referred to as Eastern Tech.

ETHS was previously known as Eastern Vocational Technical High School (EVT), but due to a lack of participation in the vocational program and an increased demand for technology education, the vocational program was removed and the school was renamed in 1994. Unlike the other high schools in the area, Eastern Tech is not bound to one specific school district. All students must take an entrance exam and meet certain criteria for acceptance to the school.

== Academics ==
The 2024–2025 enrollment at Eastern Technical High School was 1330 students.

Eastern Technical High School received a 81.9 out of a possible 90.0 points (91%) on the 2023-2024 Maryland State Department of Education Report Card and received a 5 out of 5 star rating, ranking in the 99th percentile among all Maryland schools.

As of 2026, U.S News ranked Eastern Tech as the 46th best high school in the nation and the #1 high school in the state of Maryland. Eastern Tech received a 99.74/100 overall score.

== Magnet programs ==
Eastern Tech offers students with nine different magnet programs for students to choose from for a career pathway in their interest.

Magnet programs

- Academy of Health Professionals
- Building of Construction Technology
- Culinary Arts
- Engineering Careers
- Environmental Technology
- Interactive Media Production
- It Networking
- Law and Public Policy
- Teacher Academy of Maryland

== Athletics ==
In 2005, the Varsity Baseball Team won the school's first ever State Championship. A few months later, the Girls Varsity Soccer Team won the second.

Eastern Tech's teams occasionally practice on other campuses around the Essex area, such as the neighboring Kenwood High School or CCBC Essex.

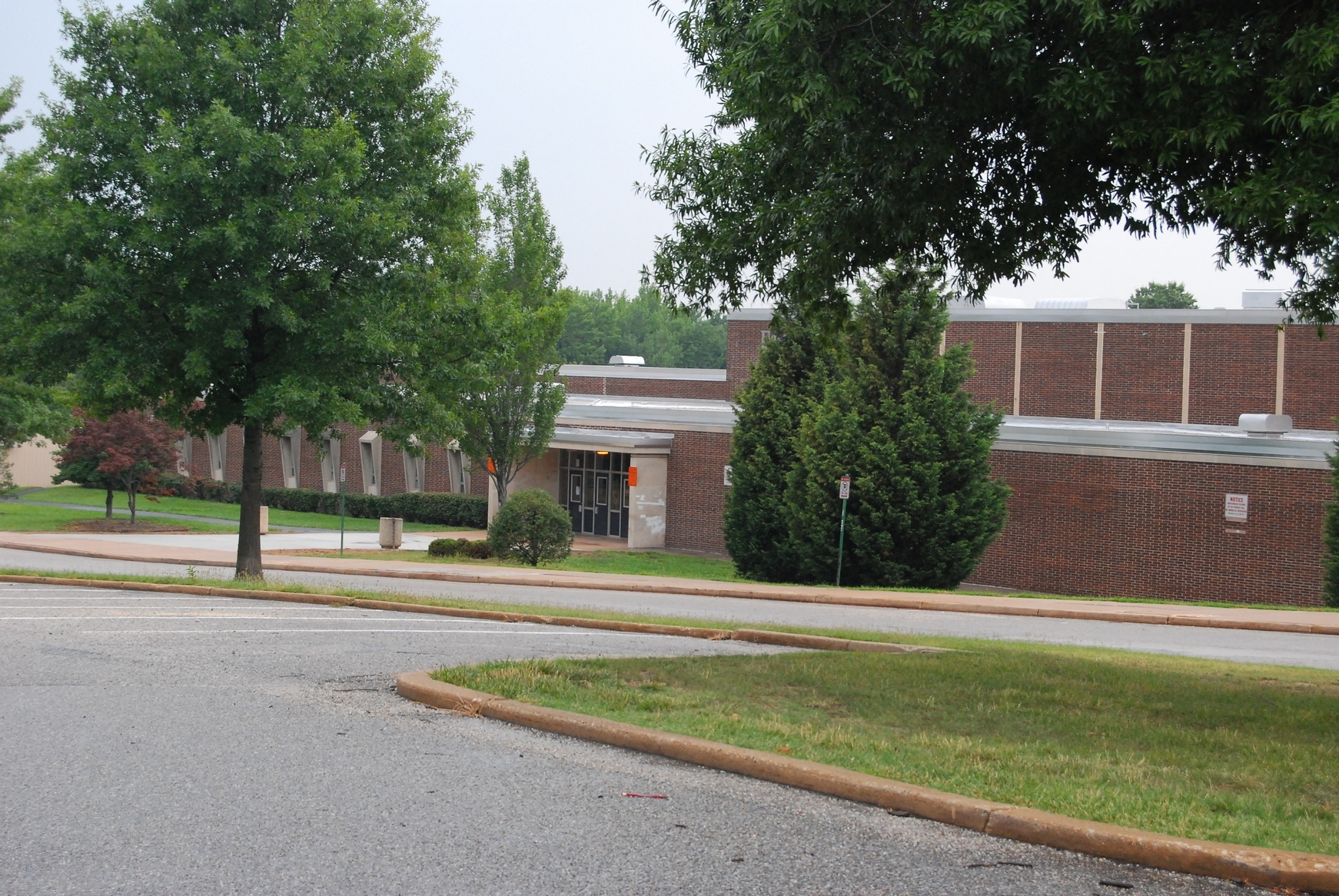
Though Eastern Tech has no home track, they have produced state champions in a number of track events.

=== State championships ===
Football Class B 1972 state championship (team went undefeated)

- 2A 2009
- John H. Cox Football Sportsmanship Award 2009

Girls Soccer

- 2A 2005

Boys Soccer

- 2A 2017

Wrestling

- Class AA-A 1987

Baseball

- 2A 2005, 2007

Softball

- 2A 2014

== Notable alumni ==
- Timothy R. Ferguson, Former Maryland State Senator
- Rudy Gay, former NBA basketball player, attended Eastern Tech High School for 2 years
- Robin L. Grammer, Jr., Maryland House of Delegates Representative
- Wayne Jenkins, Former Baltimore City Police Officer charged as the ringleader in the Gun Trace Task Force Scandal and sentenced to 25 years in Federal Prison.
- Ego Nwodim, current Saturday Night Live cast member
- Scott Seiss, actor, comedian and TikToker

== See also ==
- List of high schools in Maryland
