= Green House Project =

American long-term care organization

- Founded: 2003
- Founder: William H. Thomas (physician)
- Area served: As of June 2023, there are 382 open Green House homes on 81 campuses in 33 states
- Key people: Susan Ryan, Penny Cook
- Website: greenhouseproject.org

The Green House Project is an American national non-profit organization dedicated to creating alternative living environments to traditional nursing home care facilities.

The project creates "caring homes for meaningful lives" for elders where residents have private rooms and baths, can move freely through the home, build deep knowing relationships with each other more and even participate in preparing their own meals. It is based on a philosophy seeking to reverse the "enforced dependency" of life in a traditional nursing home by creating small intentional communities of 10 to 12 elders designed to foster late-life development and growth.

Residents of Green House Project homes have shown "increased reports of mobility and social interaction, and fewer reports of weight loss and depression" compared with those living in traditional nursing home facilities.

== History ==
The project was first developed by Steve McAlilly, CEO of Mississippi Methodist Senior Services, and by geriatrician William H. Thomas in 2003, with the goal of personalizing elder care by redesigning nursing homes "from scratch" to provide residents more privacy and control over their lives. McAlilly was preparing to demolish the old 'big box' nursing home and build another when he had a creative idea: call up Bill Thomas and ask what he'd do to reinvent care for the frail elderly.

Thomas is an international authority on elder care and has authored four books on the subject. In the early 1990s, Thomas and his wife, Jude Thomas, founded the Eden Alternative, now a global nonprofit organization that aims to deinstitutionalize long term care facilities by changing the culture of the typical nursing home.

Recognizing that nursing homes were "aging faster than the people living inside them," Thomas later created The Green House Project with the goal of replacing the institutional nursing home model with small intentional communities where elders and staff focus on living full and vibrant lives.

In 2005, the Robert Wood Johnson Foundation announced a five-year, $10 million grant for The Green House Project across the United States. NCB Capital Impact currently administers The Green House Project and will continue to do so beyond the current five-year grant.

The first Green House Project home was constructed in 2003 in Tupelo, Mississippi. NCB Capital Impact set a goal to complete 50 houses by 2010; that goal was reached in December 2008. As of 2023, there are 382 Green House Project homes on 81 campuses in 33 states.

== Green House Project Homes ==
In a typical Green House Project home, each elder has his or her own private room and bathroom. Homes typically also include a living room, kitchen and open dining area. The homes are built to blend in with surrounding houses and neighborhoods. The Green House Project model allows for urban, rural and suburban style homes.

Residents do schedules and are encouraged to interact with staff and other residents, plus visitors (pets and family members). Staff members and residents develop personal relationships with one another because of the small community and home atmosphere.

Staff members in Green House Project homes are broken up into four different roles: the Shahbaz, the Guide, the Sage and the Clinical Support Team. The Shahbaz is the versatile worker who provides personal care, prepares meals and performs housekeeping for the elders. The name was borrowed from the Persian word for the sultan's hunting falcon. Thomas liked the image of a keen-eyed, flexible helper, and the word had no English pre-set, so the Shahbaz could be a new entity. The Guide is the supervisor of the Shahbaz and is responsible for the operations of the home. The Sage is a local elder who volunteers to be a mentor and advise to the work teams in The Green House Project home. The Clinical Support Team comprises nurses, therapists, services, activities and dietary professionals who work with the Shahbaz to provide individualized care for each elder.

== Costs ==
Green House Project homes that are licensed as traditional nursing homes are eligible for Medicaid and Medicare reimbursements along the same lines as a traditional nursing home. If the facility is licensed as assisted living, Medicaid reimbursement depends on the state’s assisted living provisions. For Medicaid, the costs are equivalent to the traditional Medicaid costs for nursing homes. If the income level is above the Medicaid minimum, there may be a co-pay for residents. For private pay, each facility determines its own private pay cost structure based on their local market.

== Evaluations ==
Recent research by Susan Horn and colleagues (2012) examined differences in the Medicare and Medicaid costs in Green House homes compared to traditional nursing homes. Using previously collected data, the information below reflects a preliminary analysis of this issue. Current research being conducted by a collaborative of research partners under Robert Wood Johnson Foundation funding will examine this issue further.

A 2009 evaluation of Green House Project care found it provided higher direct care (23–31 minutes more per resident per day) than traditional nursing homes and more than four times as much staff engagement with elders outside direct care activities.

In a 2004 report presented to the United States Congress, researchers from the University of Minnesota School of Public Health found that the use of a social model of care and maximum staff empowerment to serve elders needing skilled nursing care resulted in ‘statistically significantly’ favorable outcomes over traditional facilities." The researchers found that elders in a Green House Project home were able to perform daily functions longer than those in traditional nursing facilities.

In November 2008, Senate Finance Committee Chair Max Baucus (D-MT) said The Green House Project model "has shown promise for both improving the quality of life and care in these settings."

According to Provider Magazine’s May 2010 cover story about The Green House Project, "The homes, which are designed for the purpose of offering ‘privacy, autonomy, support, enjoyment, and a place to call home,’ are a radical departure from traditional skilled nursing facilities and are considered to be the peak of culture change."

In 2011, Green House Project was named as one of the "Top Ten Senior Living Design Innovations" by Long-Term Living Magazine.
