= Payam-e-Zan =

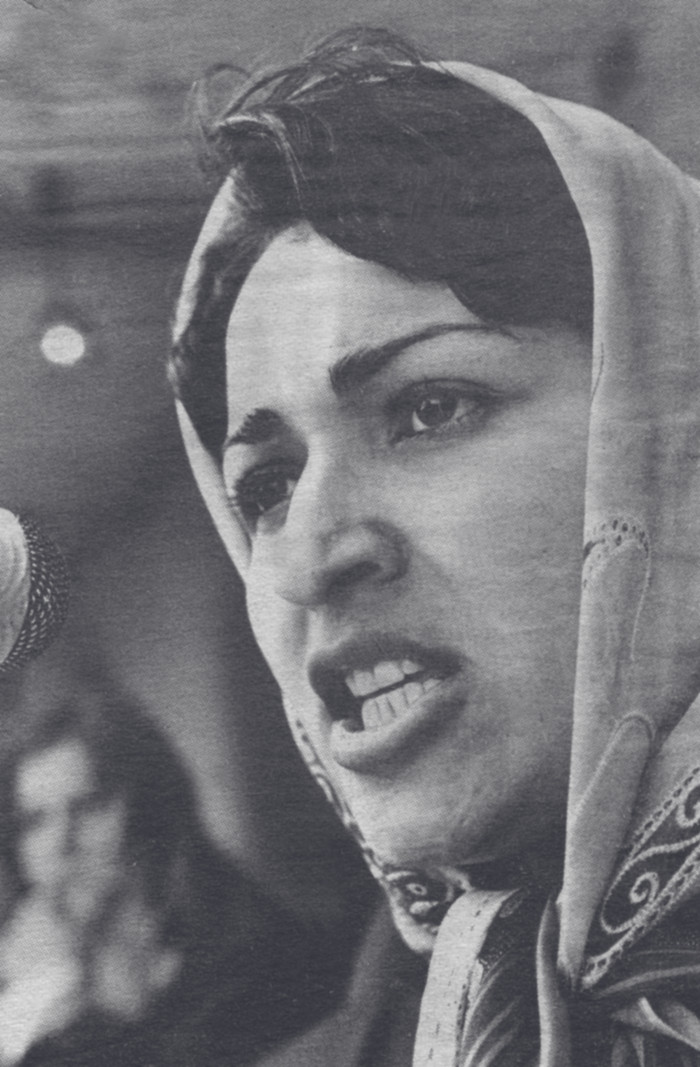
Meena Keshwar Kamal (1956 - 1987), founder of Payam-e-Zan

Payam-e-Zan is a women's magazine published in Afghanistan by the Revolutionary Association of the Women of Afghanistan (RAWA). Literally translated, the name means "Women's Message." It began as a quarterly publication in Persian/Pushto and Urdu that focused on women's rights and opposing fundamentalism with strong socialist leanings. Over time, it became a major source for news on politics and society more generally. It is now an online magazine as part of www.rawa.org.

The magazine began publishing in 1981, founded by Meena Keshwar Kamal, and was distributed largely by RAWA volunteers, often at substantial personal risk. Generally, a volunteer would walk around markets in Pakistan and Afghanistan with copies of the magazine, and as word spread, women would find the distributor. The female RAWA workers would usually not work in their hometowns so as to avoid being recognised and later persecuted.
