= Meena Keshwar Kamal =

Afghan activist (1956–1987)

- مینا کشور کمال
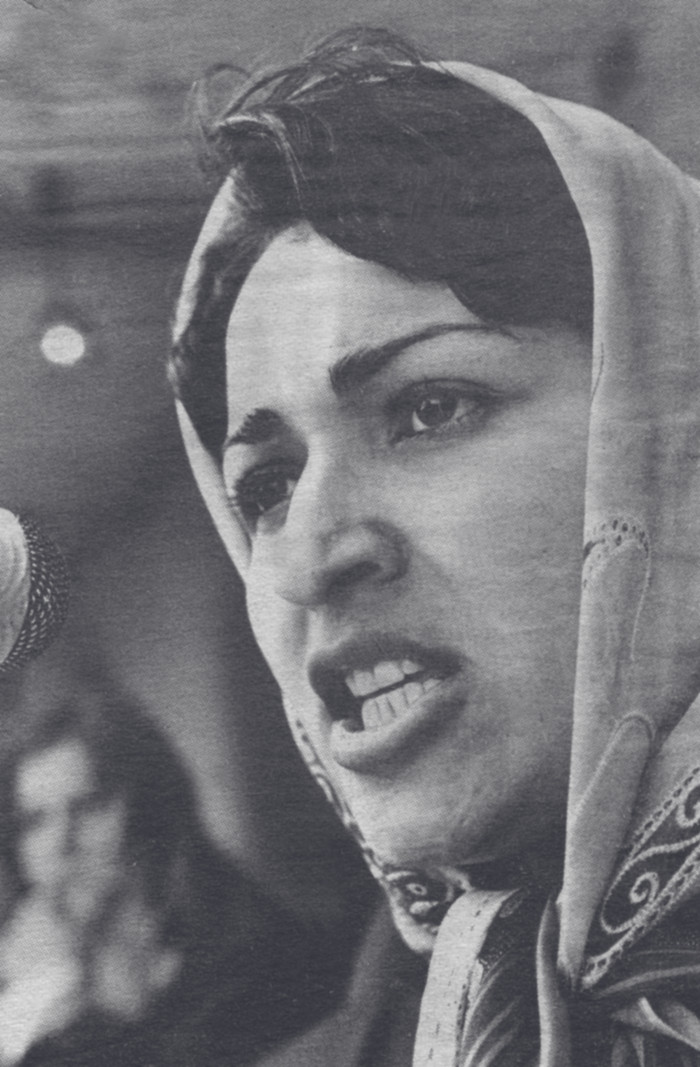
- Meena Keshwar Kamal, 1982
- Born: 27 February 1956; Kabul, Kingdom of Afghanistan
- Died: 4 February 1987 (aged 30); Quetta, Pakistan
- Cause of death: Assassination
- Education: Kabul University
- Occupations: Revolutionary political activist, feminist, activist
- Years active: 1977–1987
- Organization: Founder of Revolutionary Association of the Women of Afghanistan (RAWA)
- Spouse: Faiz Ahmad (1976-1986)

Meena Keshwar Kamal (Pashto/Dari: مینا کشور کمال; 27 February 1956 – 4 February 1987), commonly known as Meena, was an Afghan revolutionary political activist, women's rights activist, and founder of the Revolutionary Association of the Women of Afghanistan (RAWA). She was assassinated in 1987.

== Biography ==
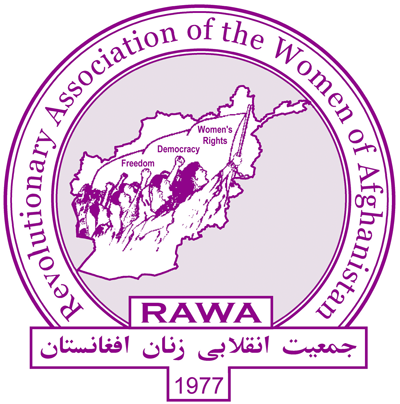
Logo of the Revolutionary Association of the Women of Afghanistan (RAWA)

Meena was born to an educated Kabuli Pashtun family. In 1977, when she was a student at Kabul University, she founded Revolutionary Association of the Women of Afghanistan (RAWA), an organization formed to promote equality and education for women that continues to "give voice to the deprived and silenced women of Afghanistan". Kamal felt that there was no vast changes of women's deprivation in Afghanistan. In 1979 she campaigned against the government, and organized meetings in schools to mobilize support against it, and in 1981, she launched a bilingual feminist magazine, Payam-e-Zan (Women's Message). She also founded Watan Schools to aid refugee children and their mothers, offering both hospitalization and the teaching of practical skills.

At the end of 1981, by invitation of the French Government, Meena represented the Afghan resistance movement at the French Socialist Party Congress. The Soviet delegation at the Congress, headed by Boris Ponamaryev, left the hall as participants cheered when Meena started waving a victory sign. She would eventually move and base her RAWA organization in Quetta, Pakistan, in opposition to the Afghan Marxist government.

== Personal life ==
Kamal was married, in 1976, to Afghanistan Liberation Organization leader Faiz Ahmad, who was murdered in Peshawar, Pakistan, by agents of Gulbuddin Hekmatyar on 12 November 1986. Meena was murdered less than 3 months afterwards. They had three children, whose whereabouts are unknown.

== Assassination ==
Kamal was assassinated in Quetta, Pakistan on 4 February 1987. Reports vary as to who the assassins were, but are believed to have been agents of the Afghan Intelligence Service KHAD, the Afghan secret police. In May 2002, two men were hanged in Pakistan after being convicted of Kamal's murder.

== Legacy ==
A special issue of Time magazine on 13 November 2006, included Meena among "60 Asian Heroes" and wrote: "Although she was only 30 when she died, Meena had already planted the seeds of an Afghan women's rights movement based on the power of knowledge."

RAWA says of her "Meena gave 12 years of her short but brilliant life to struggle for her homeland and her people. She had a strong belief that despite the darkness of illiteracy, ignorance of fundamentalism, and corruption and decadence of sell outs imposed on our women under the name of freedom and equality, finally that half of population will be awaken [sic] and cross the path towards freedom, democracy and women's rights. The enemy was rightly shivering with fear by the love and respect that Meena was creating within the hearts of our people. They knew that within the fire of her fights all the enemies of freedom, democracy and women would be turned to ashes."

An enduring quote from Meena states:

Afghan women are like sleeping lions, when awoken, they can play a wonderful role in any social revolution.

== See also ==
- Revolutionary Association of the Women of Afghanistan
- Taliban treatment of women
