= Samuel J. Lomonaco Jr. =

American academic and mathematician

Samuel Lomonaco
- Born: July 11, 1942 (age 84)

Academic background
- Education: Saint Louis University (BS); Princeton University (PhD)

Academic work
- Discipline: Mathematics; Computer science Electrical engineering
- Sub-discipline: Quantum computation Topology; Quantum information science Knot theory Quantum algorithms
- Institutions: University of Maryland, Baltimore County

Samuel John Lomonaco Jr. is an American academic and mathematician who is a professor of computer science and electrical engineering at the University of Maryland, Baltimore County.

== Background ==
Lomonaco earned a Bachelor of Science degree in mathematics from Saint Louis University and a PhD in mathematics from Princeton University. Lomonaco specializes in quantum computation, topology, quantum information science, knot theory, and quantum algorithms.
