= Andreas Krause (computer scientist) =

German computer scientist

Andreas Krause (*1978) is a German computer scientist and professor working on Bayesian optimization and machine learning.

== Education ==
Andreas Krause received his diploma in computer science and mathematics from the Technical University of Munich in 2004. He earned his PhD in computer science in 2008 at Carnegie Mellon University under Carlos Guestrin.

== Research ==
In 2009, he became an assistant professor of computer science in the Department of Computing & Mathematical Sciences at the California Institute of Technology (Caltech).

Since 2011, Krause has been a professor of computer science at ETH Zurich, where he leads the Learning & Adaptive Systems Group. He is also the academic co-director of the Swiss Data Science Center and head of the ETH AI Center. His research focuses on adaptive systems that actively collect data and draw logical conclusions in large, distributed, and uncertain domains. This involves the use of statistical models, probabilistic decision theory, and optimization methods. He co-developed the GP-UCB algorithm for Bayesian optimization, which balances exploration and exploitation of autonomous agents in uncertain environments. He is a co-founder of the startup LatticeFlow and was part of the UN AI Advisory Body.

== Awards ==
Krause is an IEEE Fellow, ACM Fellow and Max Planck Fellow at the Max Planck Institute for Intelligent Systems. Krause received the 2021 Rössler Prize and the 2020 ICML Test of Time Award.
