= Pete Caringi Jr. =

American soccer coach

Personal information
- Full name: Pete Caringi Jr.
- Date of birth: March 27, 1955 (age 71)
- Place of birth: Baltimore, Maryland, U.S.
- Position: Forward

College career
Years	Team	Apps	(Gls)
1973–1977	Baltimore Bees		

Senior career*
Years	Team	Apps	(Gls)
1978	Washington Diplomats		

Managerial career
- 1981–1990: Essex Knights
- 1991–2022: UMBC Retrievers
- * Club domestic league appearances and goals

Pete Caringi Jr. (born March 27, 1955) is an American soccer coach who last managed University of Maryland, Baltimore County men's soccer team. He was named the 2014 National Soccer Coaches Association of America Division I Coach of the Year.

== Playing career ==
A former All-American and Three time captain, He played college soccer for the University of Baltimore.A four time first team all conference and two time All-South All-American In 1973 they lost in the final four to Cal Fullerton. In 1975 the Baltimore team won the NCAA National Championship in Seattle defeating Seattle-Pacific 3–1 in front of over 7,500 fans. Caringi's 2 Goals led the Bees in the final He still holds the All-Time Record for goals with 70.[He signed for the Washington Diplomats in 1978. He is a member of the University of Baltimore athletic hall of fame. Caringi is also a member of the Maryland Soccer Hall of Fame, CCBC Athletic Hall of Fame, Region XX Hall of Fame, NJCAA National Soccer Hall of Fame and just recently was inducted into the UMBC Athletics Hall of Fame

== Coaching career ==
Caringi coached the Maryland Bays to the 1990 American Professional Soccer League championship. The Bays finished the regular season 20–5 and won the finals against the San Francisco Bay Blackhawks team.

As the coach at Essex Community College from 1981 and 1990, he led Essex to seven JuCo championships and five Region XX Titles. His 84 and 89 teams played in the NJCAA National Finals. He was named NJCAA National Coach of the Year in 84 and 89. He has been the head coach of UMBC Retrievers soccer since 1991. He led UMBC to the NCAA Tournament in 99 and the 2nd Round in 2010,12,13 His 2014 College Cup semifinals, Caringi was named the NSCAA Division I Coach of the Year and the Soccer America Coach of the Year.

After 32 seasons as UMBC head coach, Caringi announced his retirement in 2023.

Preceded by Bobby Clark	NSCAA Division I Coach of the Year; 2014	Succeeded by Mike Noonan
