= Susan Sonnenschein =

Professor of Psychology at the University of Maryland, Baltimore County

Susan Sonnenschein is a professor of Psychology at the University of Maryland, Baltimore County (UMBC), where she directs the Children and Families, Schooling and Development Lab. She has served as Graduate Program Director of the Applied Developmental Psychology doctoral program since 2006. Sonnenschein's research examines ways to promote the academic success of children. Her research explores the influence of both home and school, but with a focus on the associations between parental beliefs, practices, and children's academic development. She has edited and contributed to several books and is the author of over 70 peer-reviewed articles focusing on educational contexts of development for diverse populations.

== Education ==
Sonnenschein received her BA in psychology from New York University and her M.S. in educational psychology from Pennsylvania State University. Her doctoral work was completed at Stony Brook University where she received her Ph.D. in developmental psychology. Sonnenschein is also a certified Level II School Psychologist.

== Career ==
Sonnenschein joined the psychology department at UMBC in 1979. In her time at UMBC, she has taught undergraduates courses like Advanced Child Development and Development and Education. She also teaches graduate-level courses in cognitive development and child assessment.

She has served as a mentor to numerous aspiring undergraduate and graduate-level psychologists in her time at UMBC. Since 2010, she has served on more than 37 dissertation committees and over 20 master's committees. Sonnenschein received The Donald Creighton Award for Outstanding Faculty Member 2007–2008. Presented by the Graduate Student Association at UMBC.

== Books ==
- Sonnenschein, S., & Yamamoto, Y. (Eds., 2020). Children’s perceptions of their learning and education. Early Childhood Research Quarterly, 50 Part 2.
- Academic Socialization of Young Black and Latino Children: Building on Family Strengths. (Sonnenschein, & Sawyer, (Eds., in progress).
- Family contexts of academic socialization: The role of culture, ethnicity, and socioeconomic status, Research in Human Development, (Yamamoto, & Sonnenschein, (Eds., 2016)).
- Becoming literate in the city: The Baltimore Early Childhood Project. [Finalist in the 2005 National Reading Conference's Edward Fry Book Award competition]. (Serpell, Baker, & Sonnenschein, 2005).

== Selected publications ==
- Metzger, S.R., Sonnenschein, S., & Galindo, C. (2019). Elementary-age children's conceptions about math utility and their home-based math engagement. Journal of Educational Research, 12, 431–449. DOI: 10.1080/00220671.2018.1547961
- Dowling, R., Shanty, L., Sonnenschein, S., & Hussey-Gardner, B. (in press). Talking, reading, singing, and rhyming: Tips for fostering early literacy at home. NAEYC YC.
- Simons, C.L, Metzger, S.R., & Sonnenschein, S. (2019). Children's metacognitive knowledge of five key learning processes. Translational Issues in Psychological Science: Special Issue on Metacognition, 6, 32–4,
- Shanty, L., Dowling, R., Sonnenschein, S., & Hussey-Gardner, B. (2019). Evaluation of an early language and literacy program for parents of Infants in the NICU. Journal of Neonatology Nursing, 38 (4), 207–216. 10. 1891/ 0730- 0832. 38. 4. 1
- Latina mothers’ engagement in children's math learning in the early school years: Conceptions of math and socialization practices. (Galindo, Sonnenschein, & Montoya-Avila, 2019).
- 5 math skills your child needs to know before kindergarten. (Sonnenschein, Dowling, & Metzger, 2018).
- Extending an effective classroom-based math board game intervention to preschoolers’ homes. (Sonnenschein, Metzger, Dowling, Gay, & Simons, 2016).
- Elementary-age children's conceptions about math utility and their home-based math engagement. (Metzger, Sonnenschein, & Galindo, 2019).
- Mother Goose in the NICU: Support for our neediest infants. [Invited article]. (Diamant-Cohen, Sonnenschein, Sacks, Rosswog, & Hussey-Gardner, 2018).
- Relations between preschool teachers’ language and gains in low income English language learners’ and English speakers’ vocabulary, early literacy and math skills. (Sonnenschein, Thompson, Metzger, & Baker, 2013).
