= Senior Emergency Department =

Geriatric emergency facility

The senior emergency department is a recent hospital innovation to build separate geriatric emergency rooms for older adults akin to pediatric emergency rooms designed for children. The trend comes in response to the nation's rapidly growing population of older adults and overcrowding of emergency departments. Typically, geriatric emergency rooms are designed to reduce anxiety, confusion and the risk of falling. This includes elder-friendly lighting, softer colors, noise abatement features, handrails and non-reflective flooring to reduce missteps. Research has found that the noise, chaos and crowding of typical emergency rooms has a negative impact on older patients.

The nation's first "Senior Emergency Department" was created at Holy Cross Hospital in Silver Spring, Maryland, in 2008 and designed by Dr. Bill Thomas. In addition to building a $150,000 enclosed ER for older adults, Holy Cross retrained nursing and emergency doctors in geriatrics and provided a full-time social worker.

Geriatric emergency departments were opened at St. Joseph's Regional Medical Center in Paterson, N.J., and St. Joseph Mercy in Port Huron, Mich., in 2010. More hospitals are expected to offer geriatric emergency departments as the nation's 76 million baby boomers double the number of older adults in the U.S. by 2030.
