= Anne Brodsky =

American psychologist (born 1965)

Anne Ellen Brodsky (born June 11, 1965) is an American professor in psychology and Gender and Women's Studies at the University of Maryland, Baltimore County (UMBC). She is also the Director of the Gender and Women's Studies Program, and the Chair of the Psychology Department. Also, she wrote the book, With All Our Strength: The Revolutionary Association of the Women of Afghanistan.

Brodsky was born into a Jewish family, the daughter of Allan Jay Brodsky and Clementine Hommel Klein of Shaler Township, Pennsylvania Her paternal great-grandfather emigrated from Łódź and her maternal grandparents were Germans. She attended Shaler Area High School and earned her A.B. from Vassar College, M.A. from and Ph.D. from the University of Maryland, and post-doctorate from the Johns Hopkins School of Public Health.
