= Christos Faloutsos =

Greek computer scientist

- Born: Athens
- Education: University of Toronto; National Technical University of Athens
- Scientific career
- Fields: Computer Science
- Workplaces: University of Maryland; Carnegie Mellon University
- Thesis: (1987)
- Doctoral students: Danai Koutra; Jure Leskovec
- Website: www.cs.cmu.edu/~christos

Christos Faloutsos (Greek: Χρήστος Φαλούτσος) is a Greek computer scientist and a professor at Carnegie Mellon University. He has received the Presidential Young Investigator Award by the National Science Foundation (1989), 22 best paper awards, and several teaching awards. He has served as a member of the executive committee of SIGKDD. He has published over 300 refereed articles, one monograph, and holds five patents. His research interests include data mining for streams and networks, fractals, indexing for multimedia and bio-informatics data bases, and performance.

He also received the ACM 2010 SIGKDD Innovation Award and he was also named a Fellow of the ACM in 2010.
