= Jeremy Penn =

American painter (born 1979)

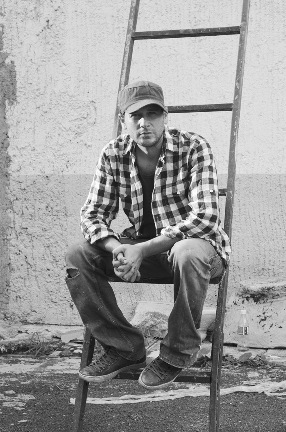
- Photo of Jeremy Penn at the Pan-American Games art exhibition RosaFest
- Born: 1979 (age 46–47)
- Education: University of Maryland and the Pratt Institute
- Known for: painting
- Awards: American Society of Furniture Designers Pinnacle Award

Jeremy Penn (born 1979) is an American artist, who lives in New York City.

== Life and career ==
Penn was born in 1979. He attended Fine Art school at the University of Maryland, and graduated from the Pratt Institute in 2003. Penn's paintings often focus on the subject of celebrities or celebrity culture. Following the completion of many of his paintings, he uses flames to sear the works to produce a less polished look. He has stated that his favorite paintings are those he has done of Brigitte Bardot, in addition to other symbols of sexuality like Anna Karina, Catherine Deneuve and Jane Birkin. There is a specific focus on the eyes of the subject in his work.

In 2009 Penn was awarded the Pinnacle Award for Top Accessory in the Home Furnishings Industry by the American Society of Furniture Designers, for the "Bloomin' Onion Vase" he designed for The Phillips Collection. That year he was the first ever featured artist of the first annual New York City Freedom Week, with an exhibition of portraits painted of the survivors of commercial sex exploitation and child soldiery. The exhibition took place at the Kimmel Center for the Performing Arts on September 24.

In 2011 Penn's portrait of Emmanuel Jal entitled War Child was the winner of the Peace Maker Award at The Peace Project art exhibition. Jal was also the subject of a documentary film of the same name. In July Penn was a part of the Clipped art exhibition at Le Salon d’Art in New York City. In September Penn was then chosen as the sole artist to represent the United States at the Pan-American Games international art exhibition RosaFest. In October Penn was featured in Home Fashion & Furniture Trends Magazine for his use of sustainable materials in his artwork, including future furniture design work with The Phillips Collection. In November Penn's works became a part of an exhibition in the duplex penthouse of the Trump SoHo which was curated by Indiewalls. Then on December 21, 2012, Penn was exhibited as a part of the Mayan Parade exhibition, inspired by the end of the Mayan calendar. Penn was also exhibited at Red Bull Curates New York.
