= UMBC College of Engineering and Information Technology =

College at the University of Maryland, Baltimore County

College of Engineering and Information Technology University of Maryland, Baltimore County
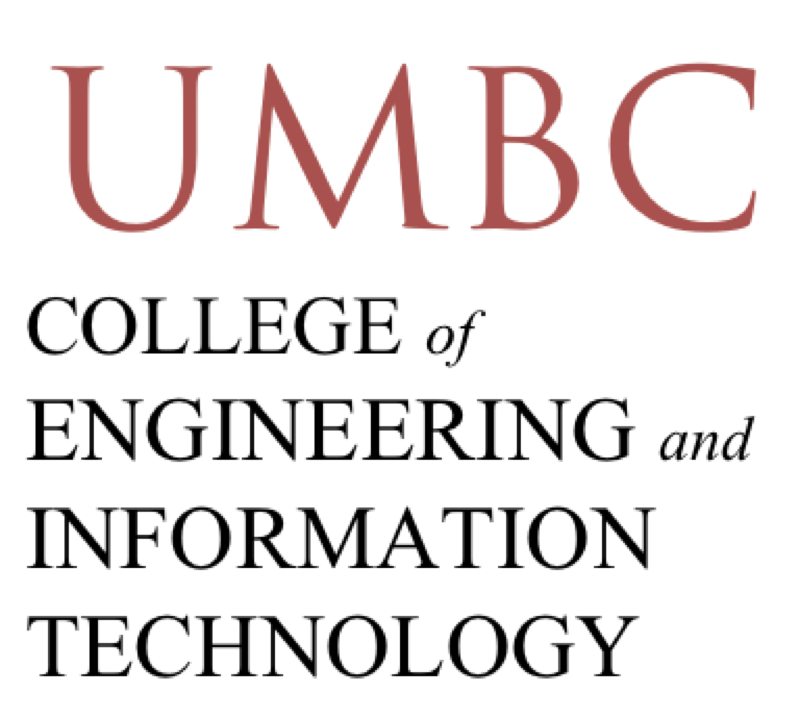
- Type: Public
- Established: 1988
- Dean: Jeanne Van Briesen
- Location: Baltimore, Maryland, United States 39°15′15″N 76°42′51″W
- Website: coeit.umbc.edu

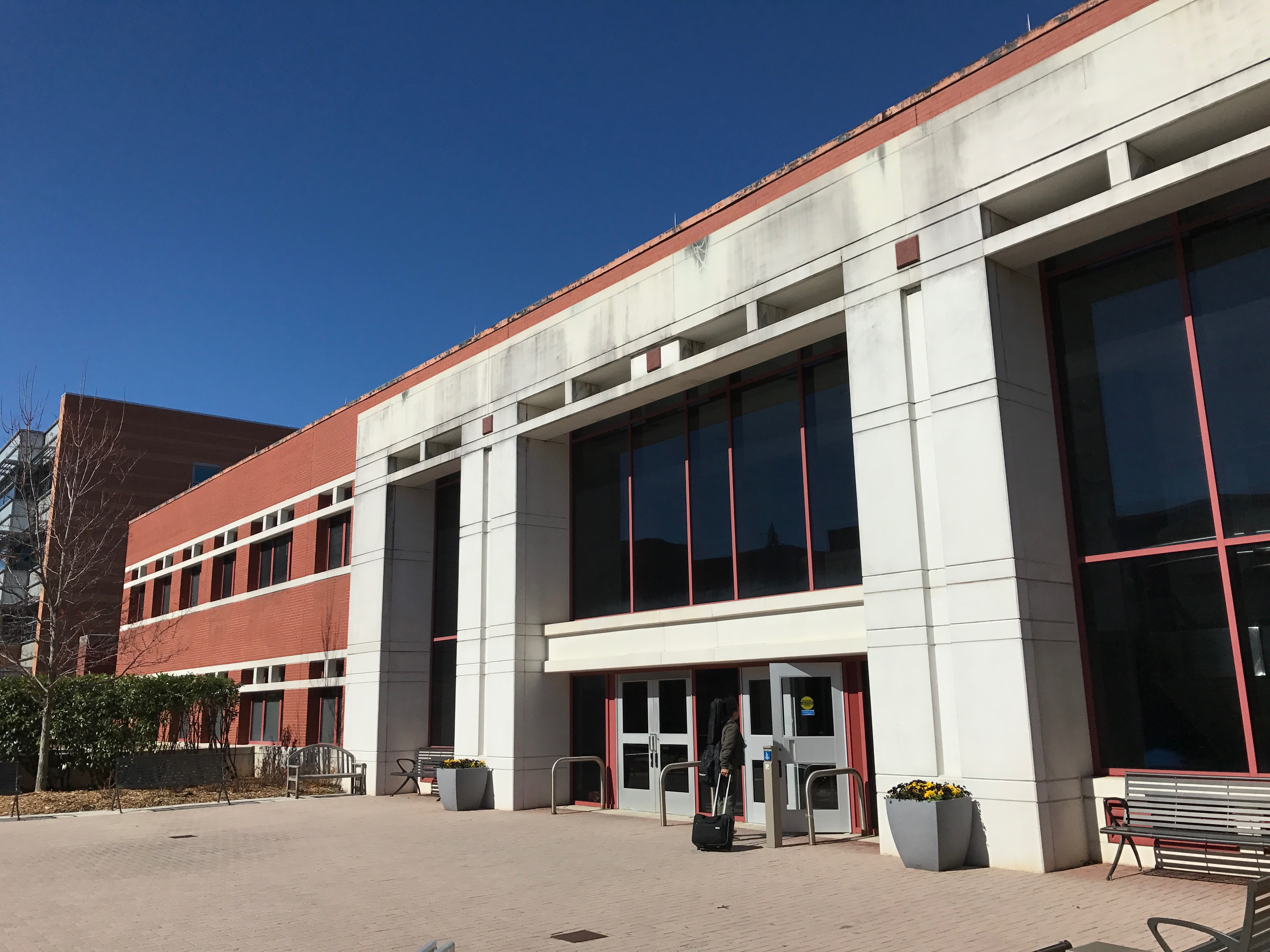
Engineering Building

The College of Engineering and Information Technology (COEIT) is one of three colleges at the University of Maryland, Baltimore County. The college offers bachelor's, master's, and doctoral degrees in various engineering, computer science, and information systems programs for full and part-time students. The programs featured in the College of Engineering and Information Technology are ranked for top enrollments and degrees in several areas.

== History ==
The College of Engineering and Information Technology was first established as an extension of the A. James Clark School of Engineering of the University of Maryland, College Park up until 1988 when the organization of the University System of Maryland was formed, giving autonomy to the University of Maryland, Baltimore County.

== Departments ==
- Chemical, Biochemical & Environmental Engineering
- Computer Science and Electrical Engineering
- Information Systems
- Mechanical Engineering

== Centers ==
- Center for Accelerated Real Time Analytics
- Center for Advanced Studies in Photonics Research
- Center for Advanced Sensor Technology
- Center for Artificial Intelligence
- Center for Cybersecurity
- Center for Urban Environmental Research & Education
- Center for Information Security and Assurance
- Center for Women In Technology
