= Christopher Corbett =

American author and journalist

- Born: December 11, 1951 (age 74); Maine
- Education: Northwestern University (B.S.)

Christopher Corbett is an American author and journalist. He has written for Associated Press, The New York Times, The Wall Street Journal, The Washington Post and The Philadelphia Inquirer. Since 1995, Corbett has written The Back Page for Baltimore Style Magazine.

He is currently an English professor at the University of Maryland, Baltimore County (UMBC).

== Books ==
Corbett has also written:

- Vacationland (1986)
- Orphans Preferred: The Twisted Truth and Lasting Legend of the Pony Express (2003)
- The Poker Bride: The First Chinese in the Wild West (2010)
