= Kevin Gnatiko =

American soccer player

Personal information
- Full name: Comlan Keva Kevin Gnatiko
- Date of birth: June 3, 1986 (age 40)
- Place of birth: Lomé, Togo
- Height: 5 ft 7 in (1.70 m)
- Position: Midfielder

Team information
- Current team: Crystal Palace Baltimore
- Number: 11

Youth career
- 2005–2008: UMBC Retrievers

Senior career*
Years	Team	Apps	(Gls)
2008	Cape Cod Crusaders	8	(0)
2009–2011	Crystal Palace Baltimore	16	(0)
- * Club domestic league appearances and goals as of 11 October 2009

Kevin Gnatiko (born June 3, 1986, in Lomé) is a Togolese-born American soccer player who previously played for Crystal Palace Baltimore in the USSF Second Division, and founder of Go Premier Soccer, based in Montgomery County, Maryland.

== Career ==
=== College and amateur ===
Born in Togo, Gnatiko moved with his parents to the United States while he was still a small child, settling in Montgomery Village, Maryland. He attended Watkins Mill High School and played college soccer at the University of Maryland Baltimore County, where he earning second-team All-America East honors as a junior.

During his college years he also played with the Cape Cod Crusaders in the USL Premier Development League.

=== Professional ===
Gnatiko turned professional in 2009, having been invited to the USL2 combine, and subsequently signed with Crystal Palace Baltimore. He made his pro debut on April 17, 2009, as a substitute in Baltimore's 0–0 season opening tie with the Pittsburgh Riverhounds.
