= Scott Seiss =

American comedian and TikTok personality

- Born: March 15, 1994 (age 32); Dundalk, Maryland, U.S.
- Education: Eastern Technical High School; University of Maryland Baltimore County
- Occupations: Comedian; actor

TikTok information
- Page: Scott Seiss
- Followers: 1.8 million
- Website: www.scottseiss.com

Scott Matthew Seiss (/siːs/; born March 15, 1994) is an American stand-up comedian, actor, author, and TikToker. He is best known for his repeated portrayal on TikTok of an angry retail worker, popularly referred to as the Angry IKEA Guy, or Angry Retail Guy. The videos are partly based on his experience as a customer service employee at IKEA. Seiss was also cast in the 2023 comedy film Cocaine Bear, as well as in Shortcomings.

== Early life ==
Seiss was born and raised in Dundalk, Maryland, a suburb of Baltimore, by a single mother alongside a younger sister. Seiss is a graduate of Eastern Technical High School in Essex and University of Maryland Baltimore County.

== Career ==
Seiss worked as a customer service representative at an IKEA call center from 2016 to 2019, where he handled complaints regarding deliveries. Although he did not work in store, the complaints inspired his "Angry Retail Guy" TikTok character. The videos center Seiss as an irritated retail worker sarcastically reacting to customers or superiors. Seiss's videos have been shared by Patton Oswalt, LeBron James, Jim Gaffigan and Paul F. Tompkins. During the first wave of his videos' popularity, Seiss was working a day job as a social media manager for PBS.

In 2021, Seiss was cast in the comedy film Cocaine Bear, directed by Elizabeth Banks.

In 2022, he went on tour in the Pacific Northwest. He has opened for comedians such as Josh Wolf, Roy Wood Jr., and Bo Burnham.

On February 22, 2024, Seiss announced on his TikTok page that he wrote a book called The Customer Is Always Wrong: An Unhinged Guide to Everything That Sucks About Work (from an Angry Retail Guy). The book was available to pre-order until September 10, 2024.

In 2024, Seiss was a part of JokeNite, a comedy special for the video game Fortnite that was produced by Trevor Noah.

== Filmography ==
=== Film ===
Year	Title	Role	Notes
2023	Cocaine Bear	Tom	
2023	Shortcomings	Lamont	
2026	Office Romance	Dave	
