= UMBC Erickson School of Aging =

Undergraduate and graduate college at the University of Maryland, Baltimore County

Coordinates: 39.25373°N 76.71439°W

- Type: Public
- Established: 2004
- Dean: Dana Burr Bradley
- Location: Baltimore, Maryland, United States
- Website: erickson.umbc.edu

The Erickson School of Aging at the University of Maryland, Baltimore County was founded in 2004 by John C. Erickson, with a $5 million gift from Catonsville-based Erickson Living. Erickson Communities now has more than 18,000 residents living in a nationwide network of communities.

== Mission ==
"To prepare a community of leaders who will use their education to improve society by enhancing the lives of older adults."

== Certificates and programs ==
- Bachelor of Arts, Management of Aging Services
- Master of Arts, Management of Aging Services
- Minor, Management of Aging Services
- Certificate, Senior Housing Administration
