= Steve Zerhusen =

American soccer player

Personal information
- Date of birth: August 20, 1957 (age 69)
- Place of birth: Baltimore, Maryland, United States
- Height: 6 ft 1 in (1.85 m)
- Position: Goalkeeper

Youth career
- 1975–1978: UMBC Retrievers

Senior career*
Years	Team	Apps	(Gls)
1979–1980	Fort Lauderdale Strikers	8	(0)
1979–1980	Fort Lauderdale Strikers (indoor)	8	(0)
- * Club domestic league appearances and goals

Steve Zerhusen is a retired American soccer goalkeeper who played two seasons in the North American Soccer League.

Zerhusen attended the University of Maryland, Baltimore County where he played on the men's soccer team from 1975 to 1978. He is a member of the UMBC Athletic Hall of Fame. In 1979, the Fort Lauderdale Strikers of the North American Soccer League drafted Zerhusen. He played one game during the 1979 season, then manned the nets for the 1979-1980 NASL indoor season. Zerhusen played another seven games during the 1980 outdoor season, then was released by the team.

Zerhusen later worked as a systems engineer for CareFirst Blue Cross Blue Shield in Baltimore. He was inducted into the Maryland Soccer Hall of Fame in 2002.
