= List of presidents and chancellors of the University of Wisconsin–Madison =

This is a list of presidents and chancellors of the University of Wisconsin–Madison.

== List of presidents ==
No.	Image	UW presidents	Term start	Term end	Refs.
1 (Note: Appointed as Chancellor)		John Hiram Lathrop	1849	1858	
2		Henry Barnard	1859	1861	
3 (Note: Appointed as Executive officer)		John Whelan Sterling	1861	1867	
4		Paul Chadbourne	1867	1870	
5		John Hanson Twombly	1871	1874	
6		John Bascom	1874	1887	
7		Thomas Chrowder Chamberlin	1887	1892	
8		Charles Kendall Adams	1892	1901	
Acting		Edward Asahel Birge	1901	1903	
9		Charles R. Van Hise	1903	1918	
10		Edward Asahel Birge	1918	1925	
11		Glenn Frank	1925	1937	
Acting		George Sellery	1937	1937	
12		Clarence Addison Dykstra	July 1, 1937	January 1945	
13		Edwin Broun Fred	February 15, 1945	June 30, 1958	
14		Conrad Elvehjem	July 1, 1958	July 27, 1962 (Note: Died while in office.)	
15		Fred Harvey Harrington (Note: In 1963, Harrington reorganized the University of Wisconsin by creating one central administration, and separate administrations for each of the individual campuses (Madison, Milwaukee, and University Centers). Harrington remained the president of the central administration, while Robert Clodius became the acting provost of the Madison campus. Later, in 1970, Clodius became the acting president of the central administration until John Weaver took over in 1971.)	July 1962	September 30, 1970	
Acting		Robert Clodius	October 1, 1970	December 31, 1970	
16		John Carrier Weaver (Note: In 1971, the University of Wisconsin System was created by merging all four campuses (Madison, Milwaukee, Green Bay, and Parkside) and the Wisconsin State Universities. John Weaver became the first president of the UW system.)	January 1, 1971	October 11, 1971	

== List of chancellors ==
In 1963, Fred Harvey Harrington reorganized the University of Wisconsin by creating one central administration, and separate administrations for each of the individual campuses (Madison, Milwaukee, and University Centers). Harrington remained the president of the central administration, while Robert Clodius became the acting provost of the Madison campus.

No.	Image	UW–Madison Chancellors	Term start	Term end	Refs.
Acting (Note: Appointed as Acting provost.)		Robert Clodius	March 8, 1963	August 31, 1964	
1 (Note: First appointed as Provost, then position was changed to Chancellor in 1965.)		Robben Wright Fleming	September 1, 1964	1967	
2		William H. Sewell	1967	1968	
Acting		Bryant Kearl	July 1, 1968	September 12, 1968	
3		Hugh Edwin Young	September 13, 1968	1977	
Acting		Glenn Simpson Pound	1977	1977	
4		Irving Shain	1977	1986	
Acting		Bernard Cecil Cohen	1987	1987	
5		Donna Shalala	1988	1993	
6		David Ward	1993	2000	
7		John D. Wiley	January 1, 2001	August 31, 2008	
8		Carolyn "Biddy" Martin	September 1, 2008	July 17, 2011	
Interim		David Ward	July 18, 2011	July 21, 2013	
9		Rebecca Blank	July 22, 2013	May 31, 2022 (Note: Resigned to head Northwestern University, but died a few months later.)	
Interim		John Karl Scholz	June 1, 2022	August 3, 2022	
10		Jennifer Mnookin	August 4, 2022	May 16, 2026 (Note: Resigned to head Columbia University.)	
Interim		Eric Wilcots	May 17, 2026	present	

Table notes:
