= William H. Sewell =

American sociologist (1909–2001)

- Born: November 27, 1909; Perrinton, Michigan
- Died: June 24, 2001 (aged 91); Madison, Wisconsin
- Known for: Wisconsin model

Academic background
- Thesis: The Construction and Standardization of a Scale for the Measurement of Oklahoma Farm Family Socio-economic Status (1939)
- Doctoral advisor: F. Stuart Chapin

William Hamilton Sewell (November 27, 1909 – June 24, 2001) was a United States sociologist and the chancellor of the University of Wisconsin–Madison during the 1967–1968 school year. He is the father of William H. Sewell Jr.

== Biography ==
Sewell was born on November 27, 1909, in Perrinton, Michigan. He attended Michigan State University, where he received his BA in 1933 and his MA in 1934, both in sociology. He then attended the University of Minnesota, where he received his Ph.D. in sociology in 1939 with a dissertation supervised by F. Stuart Chapin. He briefly taught at Michigan State and Oklahoma State before he became a professor of sociology at the University of Wisconsin in 1946, where he became the chancellor in 1967.

Sewell was known for his research in the sociology of inequality, especially in schooling, as well as his empirical approach to sociology.

Sewell became chancellor of the Madison campus in 1967, in the midst of the Vietnam War and student protests. After a tough year due to the protesting, in June 1968, he resigned as chancellor and returned to research and teaching. In 1971 Sewell served as president of the American Sociological Association. He was elected to the United States National Academy of Sciences in 1976 and the American Philosophical Society in 1979.

== Personal life ==
Sewell was the father of historian William H. Sewell Jr. Sewell, Sr. died in Madison, Wisconsin, in 2001.

== Selected works ==
- Sewell, William H.; Haller, Archibald O.; Ohlendorf, George W. (December 1970). "The Educational and Early Occupational Status Attainment Process: Replication and Revision" (PDF). American Sociological Review. 35 (6): 1014–1027. doi:10.2307/2093379. JSTOR 2093379.

Academic offices
Preceded by Robben Wright Fleming	Chancellor of the University of Wisconsin–Madison; 1967–1968	Succeeded by Bryant Kearl
