= Rebecca Blank =

American economist (1955–2023)

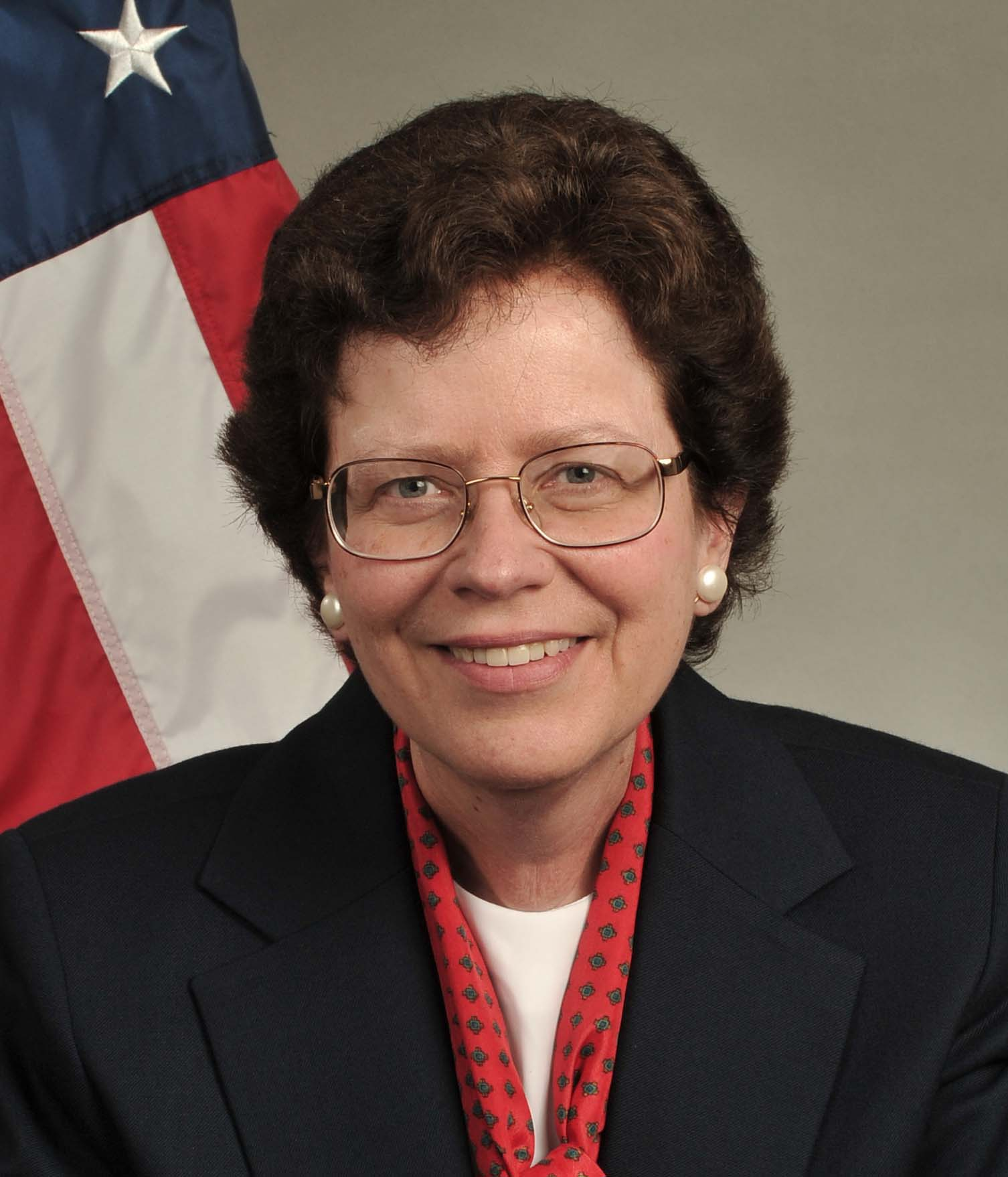
- Official portrait, 2009

Chancellor of the University of Wisconsin–Madison
- In office July 22, 2013 – June 1, 2022
- Preceded by: David Ward (acting)
- Succeeded by: Karl Scholz (acting)

Acting United States Secretary of Commerce
- In office June 11, 2012 – June 1, 2013
- President: Barack Obama
- Preceded by: John Bryson
- Succeeded by: Cameron Kerry (acting)
- In office August 1, 2011 – October 21, 2011
- President: Barack Obama
- Preceded by: Gary Locke
- Succeeded by: John Bryson

United States Deputy Secretary of Commerce
- In office November 18, 2010 – June 1, 2013; Acting: November 18, 2010 – March 29, 2012
- President: Barack Obama
- Preceded by: Dennis Hightower
- Succeeded by: Patrick Gallagher (acting)

Under Secretary of Commerce for Economic Affairs
- In office June 9, 2009 – March 29, 2012
- President: Barack Obama
- Preceded by: Cynthia Glassman
- Succeeded by: Mark Doms

Personal details
- Born: Rebecca Margaret Blank; September 19, 1955 Columbia, Missouri, U.S.
- Died: February 17, 2023 (aged 67) Fitchburg, Wisconsin, U.S.
- Party: Democratic
- Spouse: Hanns Kuttner (m. 1994)
- Children: 1
- Education: University of Minnesota (BA); Massachusetts Institute of Technology (MA, PhD)

Rebecca Margaret Blank (September 19, 1955 – February 17, 2023) was an American economist and academic administrator. She was the ninth chancellor of the University of Wisconsin–Madison from 2013 to 2022. She served in several senior roles in the United States Department of Commerce during the presidency of Barack Obama, including more than a year as acting United States Secretary of Commerce.

== Personal life and background ==
Blank was born on September 19, 1955, in Columbia, Missouri, and grew up in Roseville, Minnesota. She graduated summa cum laude from the University of Minnesota with a degree in economics and earned a Ph.D. in economics from the Massachusetts Institute of Technology.

Blank married Hanns Kuttner in 1994, and they had a daughter.

In 2022, Blank fell ill while vacationing in Europe, and was subsequently diagnosed with pancreatic cancer. She died at a hospice facility in Fitchburg, Wisconsin, on February 17, 2023, at the age of 67.

== Career ==
Blank was the Robert S. Kerr Senior Fellow at the Brookings Institution and Dean of the Gerald R. Ford School of Public Policy at the University of Michigan. From 1997 to 1999, Blank was a member of Council of Economic Advisers in the 1990s during the Clinton Administration, participating in White House decision-making on economic, social, and regulatory policy issues.

Blank was a professor of economics at Northwestern University and director of the University of Chicago–Northwestern University Joint Center for Poverty Research. She also taught at Princeton University and Massachusetts Institute of Technology.

=== Department of Commerce ===
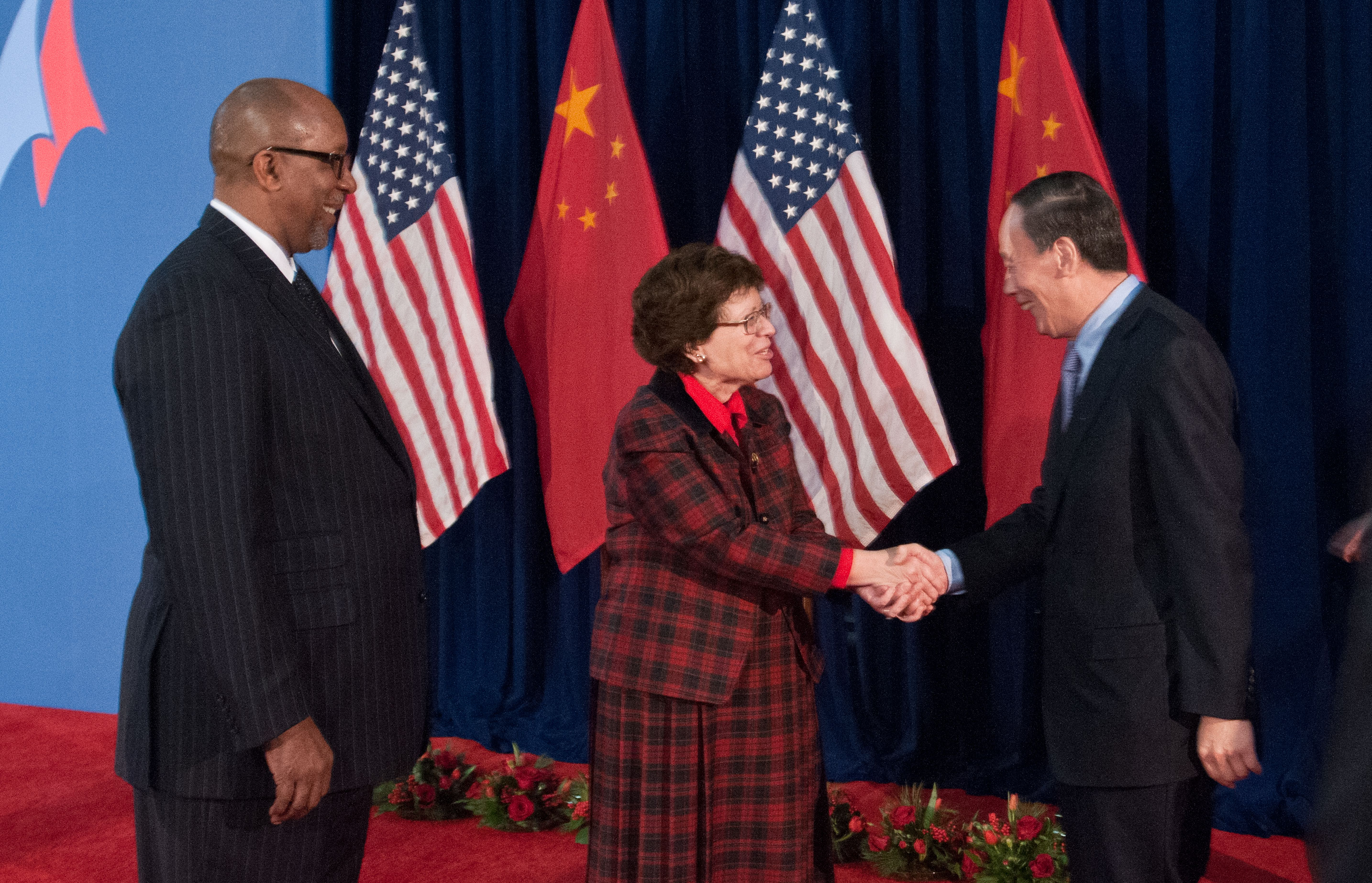
Blank in 2012 with US Trade Representative Ron Kirk and Chinese Vice President Wang Qishan

During the Obama Administration, Blank joined the U.S. Commerce Department in June 2009 as Secretary Gary Locke's principal economic advisor in her role as Under Secretary for Economic Affairs and head of the Economics and Statistics Administration (ESA). ESA oversees the two premier statistical agencies in the United States: the Census Bureau and the Bureau of Economic Analysis. She also served as Locke's appointed Board Representative to the Pension Benefit Guarantee Corporation.

During her service at ESA, Blank played an important role in overseeing a decennial Census operation that was both timely and under budget – netting $1.6 billion in 2010 savings. Within ESA, she supervised a staff of economists and policy analysts who produced various reports and forecasts that helped develop and assess domestic and international policy.

On November 18, 2010, United States Department of Commerce announced that Blank would become its Acting Deputy Secretary. In that role, she focused on management and policy matters for the department's 12 bureaus, functioning as Commerce's chief operating officer. Her management roles were overseeing nearly 45,000 employees and also a $10 billion budget.

In late 2011, President Obama nominated Blank as Deputy Secretary of Commerce. The United States Senate confirmed her to the post on March 29, 2012, by unanimous consent.

Blank became the Acting Secretary of Commerce for the first time on August 1, 2011, after Gary Locke became U.S. Ambassador to the People's Republic of China. President Obama nominated John Bryson and on October 21, 2011, he became the 37th Secretary of Commerce. At the same time, Blank was designated the Acting Deputy Secretary of Commerce.

Blank was designated Acting Secretary of Commerce a second time on June 11, 2012. Incumbent Secretary John Bryson took a medical leave of absence following his citation on felony hit-and-run charges. He transferred his powers to Blank for an undetermined length of time. A Department of Commerce spokesperson said he had suffered a seizure.

On March 18, 2013, Blank announced that she was leaving the Obama administration to become chancellor of the University of Wisconsin-Madison. Following her resignation, Cameron Kerry was designated as Acting Secretary of Commerce, pending the Senate confirmation of Penny Pritzker.

=== University of Wisconsin–Madison ===
It was announced on February 21, 2013, that Blank was one of four finalists for the position of Chancellor at the University of Wisconsin–Madison. A special committee of the University of Wisconsin System Board of Regents recommended her for the position on March 18. She announced that she would accept the position the same day. The full Board of Regents unanimously confirmed Blank as chancellor on April 5, and she began as chancellor on July 22. Blank was previously a finalist for the position in 2008, when Carolyn "Biddy" Martin was selected as Chancellor.

Throughout her time as Chancellor, Blank had to contend with an in-state undergraduate tuition freeze, in addition to hundreds of millions of dollars in cuts to state funding. She additionally worked to minimize faculty departures following the removal of statutory tenure protections by the Republican-controlled Wisconsin State Legislature as well as legislation shifting away power from a long established faculty/student shared governance arrangement to the politically appointed Board of Regents. Blank implemented full-tuition scholarship programs for Wisconsin students whose families earn less than $60,000 annually and presided over substantial increases in both the size of the Freshman class and the 4–6 year graduation rates for undergraduate students.

Blank engaged in several efforts to highlight the history of marginalized populations at the university, which included the establishment of a Public History Project and efforts to acknowledge the Ho-Chunk Nation, on whose ancestral land the UW-Madison campus sits, as well as the presence of Divine Nine fraternities and sororities on campus. Despite record increases in student body and faculty diversity, Blank came under criticism from student activists for the perceived efficacy of these changes on campus climate, as well as her responsiveness to calls for the removal of a statue of Abraham Lincoln because of his role in the genocide of indigenous populations. She also faced criticism for the removal of a campus landmark that had been historically referred to by a racial epithet, as well as the renaming of the university's Fredric March Play Circle because of its namesake's brief membership as an undergraduate in the "Ku Klux Klan" an interfraternity society composed of leading students formed at the University of Wisconsin–Madison in 1919 and 1920 which is not believed to have been affiliated with the white supremacist organization of the same name. The university report that found no evidence of an affiliation with the KKK also said that “Still, the ... choice of a name signals an identification—or, at the very least, no meaningful discomfort—with the widely known violent actions of the Reconstruction-era Klan as it was remembered, celebrated and given new cultural and institutional life in the early 20th century,” Blank defended both moves in a New York Times opinion letter, written in response to conservative linguist John McWhorter, arguing that "Universities are not static places; they live and breathe, grow and change and reinvent themselves with new energy and approaches every fall, as new students arrive ... if we do not acknowledge both the good and the bad parts of our history, we cannot construct a better present for current students, or future for the next generation."

She completed a $4 billion fundraising campaign called "All Ways Forward", the largest in school history, and set in motion long-delayed campus building projects that have included a new academic home for the College of Letters and Science, a new School of Music performance center, and a home for the newly established School of Computer, Data, and Information Sciences. However, Blank was unable to secure borrowing ability for UW-Madison, something its peer institutions were able to do. She was also unable to secure a pledge of $100 million by Foxconn to provide funding for a new research building at the College of Engineering. Foxconn had previously agreed to such a pledge as part of its proposed $10 billion investment in manufacturing in Wisconsin, which they have since reduced significantly, and without an agreed upon schedule of payments to UW-Madison.

In January 2023, it was announced that the Public History Project, a limited initiative that Blank had championed to investigate the university's history of bigotry and exclusion, would be made permanent and renamed the Rebecca M. Blank Center for Campus History.

=== Northwestern University ===
It was announced on October 11, 2021, that Blank would become the next president of Northwestern University. Blank was to succeed Morton Schapiro in the summer of 2022. Jennifer Mnookin, dean of the UCLA School of Law, was selected to replace Blank as UW chancellor.

However, on July 11, 2022, Blank announced that she would not be able to assume the role, following her cancer diagnosis. Former UCLA and University of Chicago Law dean Michael H. Schill, then serving as president of the University of Oregon, ultimately became Northwestern's next president.

== Publications ==
Blank was a member of the National Research Council panel that produced the 1995 report Measuring Poverty: A New Approach. At the Commerce Department she later led the work to implement the Supplemental Poverty Measure, which the Census Bureau introduced in 2011.

Blank wrote extensively on the interaction between the macro economy, the labor market, government social policy programs, and the behavior and well-being of low-income families. In addition to publishing numerous books, including It Takes a Nation: A New Agenda for Fighting Poverty (Princeton University Press, 1997), which won the Richard A. Lester Award for the Outstanding Book in Labor Economics and Industrial Relations, she authored almost 100 scholarly articles. Her other notable works include Changing Inequality (University of California Press, 2011), Insufficient Funds: Savings, Assets, Credit, and Banking Among Low-Income Families (jointly written with Michael Barr, Russell Sage Press, 2009), and Is the Market Moral? (co-authored with William McGurn, Brookings Press, 2004).

Political offices
Preceded by Cynthia Glassman	Under Secretary of Commerce for Economic Affairs; 2009–2012	Succeeded by Mark Doms
Preceded by Dennis Hightower	United States Deputy Secretary of Commerce; 2010–2013; Acting: 2010–2012	Succeeded by Patrick Gallagher; Acting
Preceded by Gary Locke	United States Secretary of Commerce; Acting; 2011	Succeeded by John Bryson
Preceded by John Bryson	United States Secretary of Commerce; Acting; 2012–2013	Succeeded by Cameron Kerry; Acting
Academic offices
Preceded by David Ward; Acting	Chancellor of the University of Wisconsin, Madison; 2013–2022	Succeeded by Karl Scholz; Acting
