= Under Secretary for Economic Affairs =

Under Secretary for Economic Affairs may refer to:

- for that position the US Department of Commerce : see Under Secretary of Commerce for Economic Affairs
- for that position in the US Department of State, from 1946 to 1985 : see Under Secretary of State for Economic Growth, Energy, and the Environment
