= Wisconsin Center for the Advancement of Postsecondary Education =

The Wisconsin Center for the Advancement of Postsecondary Education (WISCAPE) is a research center established in 2001 on the University of Wisconsin–Madison campus by former UW–Madison Chancellor David Ward.

== Purpose ==
Ward envisioned the center as "a policy think tank, not just an academic think tank," that would promote cross-disciplinary research and scholarship on postsecondary education, enhance professional development for those working at colleges and universities, and engage the public in a dialogue about the role of postsecondary education in a democratic society.

== Areas of focus ==
Local and national media have since highlighted the work of the center's staff, scholars, and affiliates on a variety of postsecondary education issues, including financial aid, trends in state funding for postsecondary education, returns to state investment in postsecondary education, college student transfer issues, community colleges, de facto privatization of public universities, gridlock in state policymaking, the college presidency, federal college cost containment measures, and the Wisconsin Covenant.
