= Perry William Wilson =

American scientist (1902–1981)

Perry William Wilson (November 25, 1902 – August 17, 1981) was an American microbiologist and biochemist. He gained a scientific reputation as an outstanding pioneer in transforming the science of biological nitrogen fixation. His research helped to transform a mainly descriptive science into a more quantitative and analytic science based on biochemistry and statistical methods and control in bacteriology. He was called the "dean of biological nitrogen fixation".

== Biography ==
Wilson was born in Bonanza, Arkansas. In his childhood, he moved with his family from Arkansas to Oklahoma and then to Terre Haute, Indiana, where he graduated from high school in 1920. In 1920 he became a laboratory worker at the Commercial Solvents Corporation (CSC) in Terre Haute. His first job involved taking bacterial samples of Clostridium acetobutylicum from 40,000-gallon (roughly 150,000-liter) fermentation tanks of corn mash. In autumn 1922 he enrolled as a full-time chemical engineering student at Terre Haute's Rose Polytechnic Institute but continued to work weekends at CSC. When he was offered a job as an analytic chemist at the CSC plant, he dropped out of school for a year. This new job put him into contact with the Wisconsin professors Edwin Broun Fred, Ira Lawrence Baldwin, and William Harold Peterson (1880–1960), who were part-time consultants for CSC. After a year of work at CSC, Wilson returned to Rose Polytechnic Institute for another year of study, after which he again returned to CSC. In autumn 1925, CSC decided to establish research fellowships at the University of Wisconsin–Madison (UWM). He received such a fellowship, even though he was still an undergraduate. With the help of E. B. Fred and W. H. Peterson, Wilson transferred in the 2nd semester of 1926 to UWM as an undergraduate with 50 academic credits. In the summer of 1927, he was the coauthor, with W. H. Peterson, Edwin Broun Fred, and Elizabeth McCoy, of a paper published in the Journal of the American Chemical Society. Wilson graduated from UWM in 1928 with a B.S., in 1929 with an M.S., and in 1932 with a Ph.D. in bacteriology and biochemistry. His Ph.D. thesis was supervised by E. B. Fred and W. H. Peterson.

In UWM's bacteriology department, Wilson was from 1932 to 1934 an instructor, from 1934 to 1938 an assistant professor, from 1938 to 1943 an associate professor, and from 1943 a full professor. At various times in his career, he taught courses in soil microbiology, bacterial physiology, history of bacteriology, and writing scientific reports. From 1952 to 1958, he served as editor-in-chief of Bacterial Reviews (which became Microbiology and Molecular Biology Reviews). He played a major role in a project, supported by the National Science Foundation, that prepared a new set of high school textbooks in biology.

In a scientific breakthrough in 1949, Martin D. Kamen and Howard Gest (1921–2012) reported that the photosynthetic bacterial species Rhodospirillum rubrum fixes nitrogen. Kamen and Gest were motivated to test the bacterium for nitrogen-fixing capability because they had found that R. rubrum had a hydrogenase — and Wilson was known for speculating about an association between nitrogen fixation, on one hand, and hydrogenase and hydrogen inhibition, on the other hand.

Wilson and his coworkers used ^{15}N to study the biochemistry of biological nitrogen fixation and ^{14}C to study the biochemistry of citric acid fermentation. He did considerable research on enzyme systems in biological nitrogen fixation. He was the author or coauthor of over 125 scientific publications. His doctoral students include Robert H. Burris and Orville Wyss.

Wilson was highly productive until 1972 when he had a stroke while lecturing to a large class of students in bacteriology. He recovered considerably but for the remainder of his life suffered from partial paralysis on his right side.

He was a Guggenheim fellow for the academic year 1936–1937. He was elected in 1942 a fellow of the American Association for the Advancement of Science. He was elected a member of the National Academy of Sciences in 1956. He was the president of the American Society for Microbiology in 1957.

In Vigo, Indiana in September 1929, Wilson married Helen Evelyn Hansel (1904–1985). They had a daughter and a son. Wilson died in Madison, Wisconsin in 1981.

== Selected publications ==
=== Articles ===
- Eisenhart, Churchill; Wilson, Perry W. (1943). "Statistical Methods and Control in Bacteriology". Bacteriological Reviews. 7 (2): 57–137. doi:10.1128/br.7.2.57-137.1943. PMC 440868. PMID 16350086.
- Wilson, P. W.; Burris, R. H. (1947). "The Mechanism of Biological Nitrogen Fixation". Bacteriological Reviews. 11 (1): 41–73. doi:10.1128/br.11.1.41-73.1947. PMC 440909. PMID 16350106.
- Burris, R.H.; Wilson, P.W. (1957). "[Chapter 16] Methods for measurement of nitrogen fixation". Methods in Enzymology Volume 4. Methods in Enzymology. Vol. 4. pp. 355–366. doi:10.1016/0076-6879(57)04064-1. ISBN 9780121818043.
- Hino, Seiichi; Wilson, P. W. (1958). "Nitrogen Fixation by a Facultative Bacillus". Journal of Bacteriology. 75 (4): 403–408. doi:10.1128/jb.75.4.403-408.1958. PMC 314668. PMID 13525343.
- Strandberg, G. W.; Wilson, P. W. (1968). "Formation of the nitrogen-fixing enzyme system in Azotobacter vinelandii". Canadian Journal of Microbiology. 14 (1): 25–31. doi:10.1139/m68-005. PMID 5644401. 1968

=== Books and monographs ===
- The biochemistry of symbiotic nitrogen fixation. Madison, Wisconsin: University of Wisconsin Press. 1940. ASIN B001CZMK9G; xiv+302 pages. abstract
- with Stanley G. Knight (1918–1966): Experiments in bacterial physiology (1st ed.). Minneapolis: Burgess Publishing Company. 1947. 2nd edition. 1949; iv+55 pages, illustrated. Wilson, Perry W.; Knight, Stanley G. (1952). 3rd edition; 122 pages
- Laboratory manual in bacteriology for chemistry students. Minneapolis: Burgess Publishing Company. 1953.
