= Irving Shain =

Irving Shain (January 2, 1926 – March 6, 2018) was a chemistry professor at the University of Wisconsin–Madison. He served as Chancellor of the university from 1977 to 1986.

Born in Seattle, Washington, Shain served in the United States Army from 1943 to 1946. He then attended the University of Washington, where he received his BS in 1949 and his Ph.D. in 1952, both in chemistry. He began teaching chemistry at the University of Wisconsin–Madison in 1952, and later served as the vice chancellor from 1970 to 1975. From 1975 to 1977, he went to the University of Washington in order to serve as the vice president of academic affairs, before returning to UW–Madison to become the chancellor in 1977. Shain retired from the university in 1986, and worked for the Olin Corporation until his retirement in 1992.

Shain died on March 6, 2018, after a brief illness.

Academic offices
Preceded by Glenn Simpson Pound	Chancellor of the University of Wisconsin–Madison; 1977-1986	Succeeded by Bernard Cecil Cohen
