= Mark Doms =

American economist

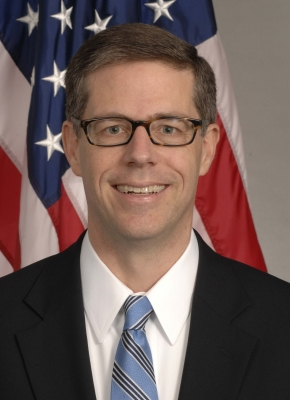

Under Secretary of Commerce for Economic Affairs
- In office January 3, 2013 – September 18, 2015
- President: Barack Obama
- Preceded by: Rebecca Blank
- Succeeded by: Karen Dunn Kelley

Chief Economist Economics and Statistics Administration
- In office August 2009 – January 2013
- President: Barack Obama

Personal details
- Party: Democratic
- Education: University of Maryland, Baltimore County; University of Wisconsin–Madison

Mark Doms was the Under Secretary of Commerce for Economic Affairs for the Department of Commerce from January 2013 until September 2015. He was nominated by President Barack Obama on September 13, 2012 and was confirmed by the Senate on January 1, 2013 as one of the last acts of the 112th Congress. Prior to his confirmation, he was the United States Department of Commerce's Chief Economist.

As the Under Secretary, Doms contributed to policies and discussions on a wide range of issues including trade, manufacturing, taxation, innovation, competitiveness, retirement security, immigration, and education. Doms also led the Economics and Statistics Administration (ESA), which includes the Census Bureau and the Bureau of Economic Analysis (BEA). Both agencies collect and produce information on the United States' population and economy. Doms also served as the Secretary's appointed Board Representative to the Pension Benefit Guarantee Corporation.

After serving as Under Secretary, Doms joined the Japan-based investment bank Nomura as a senior economist and managing director. He also was a senior fellow at the Centre for International Governance Innovation.

Since April 2020, Doms has been the Chief Economist at the Congressional Budget Office.

== Career and education ==
Doms holds a Ph.D. in economics from the University of Wisconsin-Madison and B.A. from the University of Maryland Baltimore County in mathematics and economics. In 2022, the University of Maryland Baltimore County awarded Doms an honorary Doctorate of Public Service. In the early 1990s, he worked at the Center for Economic Studies at the Census Bureau. Following this, he worked at the Research and Statistics Division of the Federal Reserve Board of Governors, where he was a researcher in the areas of innovation, productivity, wages, manufacturing, and price measurement. He then became a Senior Economist at the Federal Reserve Bank of San Francisco. From 2009 until he was confirmed by the U.S. Senate as Under Secretary for Economic Affairs, Doms was the Chief Economist at the Department of Commerce. Doms also spent time at the Organization for Economic Co-operation and Development.

== Research ==
While at the Federal Reserve Board of San Francisco, along with Norman Morin, he created indexes based on the number of articles that contain certain keywords and phrases in the title or first paragraph in the thirty largest newspapers across the US. For instance, the "recession index" is based on the number of articles that mention "recession" or "economic slowdown".
