= Cynthia Glassman =

American politician

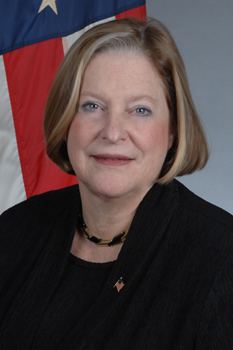

Under Secretary of Commerce for Economic Affairs
- In office October 5, 2006 – January 2009
- President: George W. Bush
- Preceded by: Kathleen Bell Cooper
- Succeeded by: Rebecca Blank

Personal details
- Education: University of Pennsylvania

Cynthia Aaron Glassman of Alexandria, Virginia is an American politician, who was a commissioner of the U.S. Securities and Exchange Commission (SEC) as well as the Under Secretary for Economic Affairs.

She served as acting chair from July 1, 2005 to August 3, 2005. She received a Ph.D. in economics from the University of Pennsylvania in 1975.
