= William H. Sewell Jr. =

American academic (born 1940)

William H. Sewell Jr. (born 1940 in Stillwater, Oklahoma) is an American academic. He is the Frank P. Hixon Distinguished Service Professor Emeritus of History and Political Science at the University of Chicago.

== Family ==
Sewell is the son of William H. Sewell, a sociologist who served as the chancellor of the University of Wisconsin-Madison from 1967 to 1968.

== Career ==
Sewell received his B.A. in history from the University of Wisconsin–Madison in 1962 and his Ph.D. in history from the University of California, Berkeley in 1971. His dissertation was titled "The Structure of the Working Class of Marseille in the Middle of the Nineteenth Century," and his advisor was the historian Hans Rosenberg. His first teaching position was in the history department at the University of Chicago from 1969 to 1975. He was a long-term member of the School of Social Science at the Institute for Advanced Study in Princeton, New Jersey, from 1975 to 1980. He taught in the history department at the University of Arizona from 1980 to 1985 and in the history and sociology departments at the University of Michigan from 1985 to 1990, when he returned to the University of Chicago. He has made contributions in the areas of modern French labor, social, cultural and political history, the history of capitalism, and social and cultural theory.

== Selected publications ==
=== Books ===
- Work and Revolution in France: The Language of Labor from the Old Regime to 1848 (Cambridge University Press, 1980).
- Structure and Mobility: The Men and Women of Marseille, 1820-1870 (Cambridge University Press 1985).
- A Rhetoric of Bourgeois Revolution: The Abbé Sieyes and "What Is the Third Estate?" (Duke University Press, 1994).
- Silence and Voice in Contentious Politics (joint author) (Cambridge University Press, 2001).
- Logics of History: Social Theory and Social Transformation (University of Chicago Press, 2005).
- Capitalism and the Emergence of Civic Equality in Eighteenth Century France (University of Chicago Press, 2021).

=== Articles and chapters ===
- "Marc Bloch and the Logic of Comparative History," History and Theory 6:2 (1967): 208–18
- "Etat, Corps and Ordre: Some Notes on the Social Vocabulary of the French Old Regime," in H. U. Wehler, ed., Sozialgeschichte Heute: Festschrift für Hans Rosenberg zum 70 Geburtstag (Göttingen, 1974), 49–68.
- "Social Change and the Rise of Working-Class Politics in Nineteenth Century Marseille," Past and Present, 65 (November, 1974): 75–109.
- "Ideologies and Social Revolutions: Reflections on the French Case", Journal of Modern History 57 (March 1985): 57–85.
- "Visions of Labor: Illustrations of the Mechanical Arts Before, In, and After Diderot's Encyclopédie." in Steven Kaplan and Cynthia Koepp, eds., Work in France: Place, Practice, Organization, and Meaning (Ithaca: Cornell University Press, 1986), 258–86.
- "Uneven Development, the Autonomy of Politics and the Dockworkers of Nineteenth-Century Marseille," American Historical Review 93 (June 1988): 604–37.
- "Le Citoyen, La Citoyenne: Activity, Passivity and the French Revolutionary Concept of Citizenship," in Colin Lucas, ed., The French Revolution and the Creation of Modern Political Culture, vol. 2, Political Culture of the French Revolution (Oxford: Pergamon Press, 1988), 105–25.
- "Beyond 1793: Babeuf, Louis Blanc and the Genealogy of 'Social Revolution,'" in François Furet and Mona Ozouf, eds., The French Revolution and the Creation of Modern Political Culture, vol. 3, The French Revolution and Modern Political Culture, 1789-1848 (Oxford: Pergamon Press, 1989), 509–526
- “How Classes Are Made: Critical Reflections on E. P. Thompson's Theory of Class Formation,” in E. P. Thompson: Critical Debates, ed. by Harvey J. Kaye and Keith McClelland (Oxford: Basil Blackwell, 1990), 50–77.
- "Beyond 1793: Babeuf, Louis Blanc and the Genealogy of 'Social Revolution,'" in François Furet and Mona Ozouf, eds., The French Revolution and the Creation of Modern Political Culture, vol. 3, The French Revolution and Modern Political Culture, 1789-1848 (Oxford: Pergamon Press, 1989), 509–526.
- "Toward a Post-Materialist Rhetoric for Labor History," in Rethinking Labor History: Essays on Discourse and Class Analysis, ed. by Lenard R. Berlanstein (Urbana: University of Illinois Press, 1993), 15–38.
- "A Theory of Structure: Duality, Agency, and Transformation," American Journal of Sociology 98 (July 1992): 1-29.
- "The Sans-Culotte Rhetoric of Subsistence," in Keith M. Baker and Colin Lucas, ed., The Terror in the French Revolution (Oxford: Pergamon Press, 1994), 249–269.
- "Three Temporalities: Toward an Eventful Sociology," in Terrence J. McDonald, ed., The Historic Turn in the Human Sciences (Ann Arbor:University of Michigan Press, 1996), 245–80.
- "Historical Events as Transformations of Structures: Inventing Revolution at the Bastille," Theory and Society 25 (1996): 841–881.
- "Geertz, Cultural Systems, and History: From Synchrony to Transformation," Representations 59 (1997): 35–55.
- "The Concept(s) of Culture," in Victoria Bonnell and Lynn Hunt, eds., Beyond the Cultural Turn: New Directions in the Study of Society and Culture (University of California Press, 1999), 35–61.
- “Space in Contentious Politics,” in Ronald Aminzade, Doug McAdam, Elizabeth Perry, William H. Sewell Jr., Sidney Tarrow, and Charles Tilly, Silence and Voice in the Study of Contentious Politics (Cambridge University Press, 2001), 51–89.
- “It's About Time: Temporality in the Study of Social Movements and Revolutions” (with Doug McAdam), in Aminzade, et al., Silence and Voice in the Study of Contentious Politics (Cambridge University Press, 2001), 8
- "The French Revolution and the Emergence of the Nation Form," in Michael Morrison and Melinda Zook eds., Revolutionary Currents: Transatlantic Ideology and Nationbuilding, 1688-1821 (Rowman and Littlefield, 2004), 91–125.
- “The Temporalities of Capitalism,” Socio-Economic Review 6 (2008): 517–37.
- “From State-Centrism to Neoliberalism: Macro-Historical Contexts of Population Health Since World War II,” in Peter Hall and Michèle Lamont, eds., Successful Societies: Institutions, Cultural Repertories, and Health (Cambridge: Cambridge University Press, 2009), 254–87.
- “A Strange Career: The Historical Study of Economic Life,” History and Theory 49 (December 2010): 146–66.
- “Economic Crises and the Shape of Modern History,” Public Culture 24, 2 (2012): 303–27.
- “Neoliberalism: Policy Regimes, International Regimes, and Social Effects,” (with Peter Evans), in Peter Hall and Michèle Lamont, eds., Social Resilience in the Neoliberal Era (Cambridge University Press, 2013), 35–68.
- "Connecting Capitalism to the French Revolution: The Parisian Promenade and the Origins of Civic Equality in Eighteenth Century France” Critical Historical Studies" 1,1 (2014): 5-46.
- “The Capitalist Epoch,” Social Science History 38: 1-2 (2014), 1–11.

"On the Emergence of Capitalism: Marx, Brenner, and the Troublesome Case of the Dutch," Critical Historical Studies, 11,1 (2024), 1-46.
