= William Bowen Sarles =

American microbiologist (1906–1987)

William Bowen Sarles (October 1, 1906, Viroqua, Wisconsin – November 14, 1987, Madison, Wisconsin) was an American microbiologist. He was the president of the American Society for Microbiology in 1967.

== Biography ==
He graduated from the University of Wisconsin–Madison (UWM) in 1925 with a B.S., in 1927 with an M.S., and in 1931 with a Ph.D. in agricultural bacteriology. His Ph.D. thesis The production of volatile acids by the fermentation of cellulose at high temperatures was supervised by Edwin Broun Fred. From 1927 to 1929 Sarles was an instructor in bacteriology at Kansas State University. From 1930 to 1932 he held an instructorship in bacteriology at Iowa State University. In UMW's department of bacteriology, he was from 1932 to 1936 an assistant professor, from 1936 to 1943 an associate professor, and a full professor to 1945 to 1972, when he retired as professor emeritus. He chaired the department from 1954 to 1968.

During WW II, on a leave of absence from UWM, Sarles served with the rank of Commander in the United States Naval Reserve from 1943 to 1945. For his work as executive officer and technical consultant assigned to the Office of the Special Consultant to the Secretary of War, he was honored in 1945 with the Legion of Merit of the United States. For his wartime service, the British government appointed him to the Honorary Officer Order of the British Empire. In 1959 he was a Carnegie visiting professor of bacteriology at the University of Hawaii.

He was elected in 1933 a fellow of the American Association for the Advancement of Science. After he died, UWM's department of microbiology established a William Bowen Sarles Scholarship.

In 1927 William B. Sarles married Marion E. Reynolds (1903–1973). They had two sons.

== Selected publications ==
=== Articles ===
- Sarles, W. B.; Hammer, B. W. (1932). "Observations on Bacillus coagulant". Journal of Bacteriology. 23 (4): 301–314. doi:10.1128/jb.23.4.301-314.1932. PMC 533326. PMID 16559554.
- Bushnell, O. A.; Sarles, W. B. (December 1937). "Studies on the Root-Nodule Bacteria of Wild Leguminous Plants in Wisconsin". Soil Science. 44 (6): 409–424. Bibcode:1937SoilS..44..409B. doi:10.1097/00010694-193712000-00001. S2CID 84141480.
- Gee, Lynn L.; Sarles, W. B. (1942). "The Disinfection of Trout Eggs Contaminated with Bacterium salmonicida". Journal of Bacteriology. 44 (1): 111–126. doi:10.1128/jb.44.1.111-126.1942. PMC 373654. PMID 16560540.
- Johansson, K. R.; Sarles, W. B.; Shapiro, Stanley K. (1948). "The Intestinal Microflora of Hens as Influenced by Various Carbohydrates in a Biotin-deficient Ration". Journal of Bacteriology. 56 (5): 619–634. doi:10.1128/jb.56.5.619-634.1948. PMC 518629. PMID 16561612.
- Johansson, K. R.; Sarles, W. B. (1948). "Bacterial Population Changes in the Ceca of Young Chickens Infected with Eimeria tenella". Journal of Bacteriology. 56 (5): 635–647. doi:10.1128/jb.56.5.635-647.1948. PMC 518630. PMID 16561613.
- Wakeman, Elizabeth J.; Smith, J. Knox; Zepplin, Marie; Sarles, William B.; Phillips, Paul H. (1948). "Microorganisms Associated with Dental Caries in the Cotton Rat". Journal of Dental Research. 27 (4): 489–492. doi:10.1177/00220345480270040701. PMID 18875178. S2CID 2956567.
- Johansson, K. R.; Sarles, W. B. (1949). "Some Considerations of the Biological Importance of Intestinal Microörganisms". Bacteriological Reviews. 13 (1): 25–45. doi:10.1128/br.13.1.25-45.1949. PMC 440942. PMID 16350127.
- Shapiro, S. K.; Sarles, W. B. (1949). "Microorganisms in the Intestinal Tract of Normal Chickens". Journal of Bacteriology. 58 (4): 531–544. doi:10.1128/jb.58.4.531-544.1949. PMC 385662. PMID 16561816.
- Shapiro, S. K.; Rhodes, R. A.; Sarles, W. B. (1949). "Lactobacilli in the Intestinal Tract of the Chicken". Journal of Bacteriology. 58 (5): 689–694. doi:10.1128/jb.58.5.689-694.1949. PMC 385686. PMID 15393699.
- Guzman-Garcia, J.; Sarles, W. B.; Baumann, C. A. (1953). "Microorganisms in the Intestines of Rats Fed Penicillin". The Journal of Nutrition. 49 (4): 647–656. doi:10.1093/jn/49.4.647. PMID 13053272.
- Monson, W. J.; Harper, A. E.; Winje, M. E.; Elvehjem, C. A.; Rhodes, R. A.; Sarles, W. B. (1954). "A Mechanism of the Vitamin-Sparing Effect of Antibiotics". The Journal of Nutrition. 52 (4): 627–636. doi:10.1093/jn/52.4.627. PMID 13163748.
- Rhodes, R. A.; Sarles, W. B.; Monson, W. J.; Harper, A. E.; Elvehjem, C. A. (1954). "Stimulation and Inhibition by Antibiotics of Intestinal Bacteria in Chicks". The Journal of Nutrition. 53 (2): 289–302. doi:10.1093/jn/53.2.289. PMID 13184365.
- Rogers, C. G.; Sarles, W. B. (1963). "Characterization of Enterococcus Bacteriophages from the Small Intestine of the Rat". Journal of Bacteriology. 85 (6): 1378–1385. doi:10.1128/jb.85.6.1378-1385.1963. PMC 278344. PMID 14047233.
- Hanes, N. B.; Sarles, W. B.; Rohlich, G. A. (1964). "Dissolved Oxygen and Survival of Coliform Organisms and Enterococci". Journal - American Water Works Association. 56 (4): 441–446. doi:10.1002/j.1551-8833.1964.tb01232.x.

=== Books ===
- Sarles, William Bowen; Frazier, William Carroll; Wilson, Joe Bransford; Knight, Stanley Glenn (1951). Microbiology: General and Applied. New York, Harper. 2nd edition. 1956.
