= John Bryson =

American businessman, lawyer and politician (1943–2025)

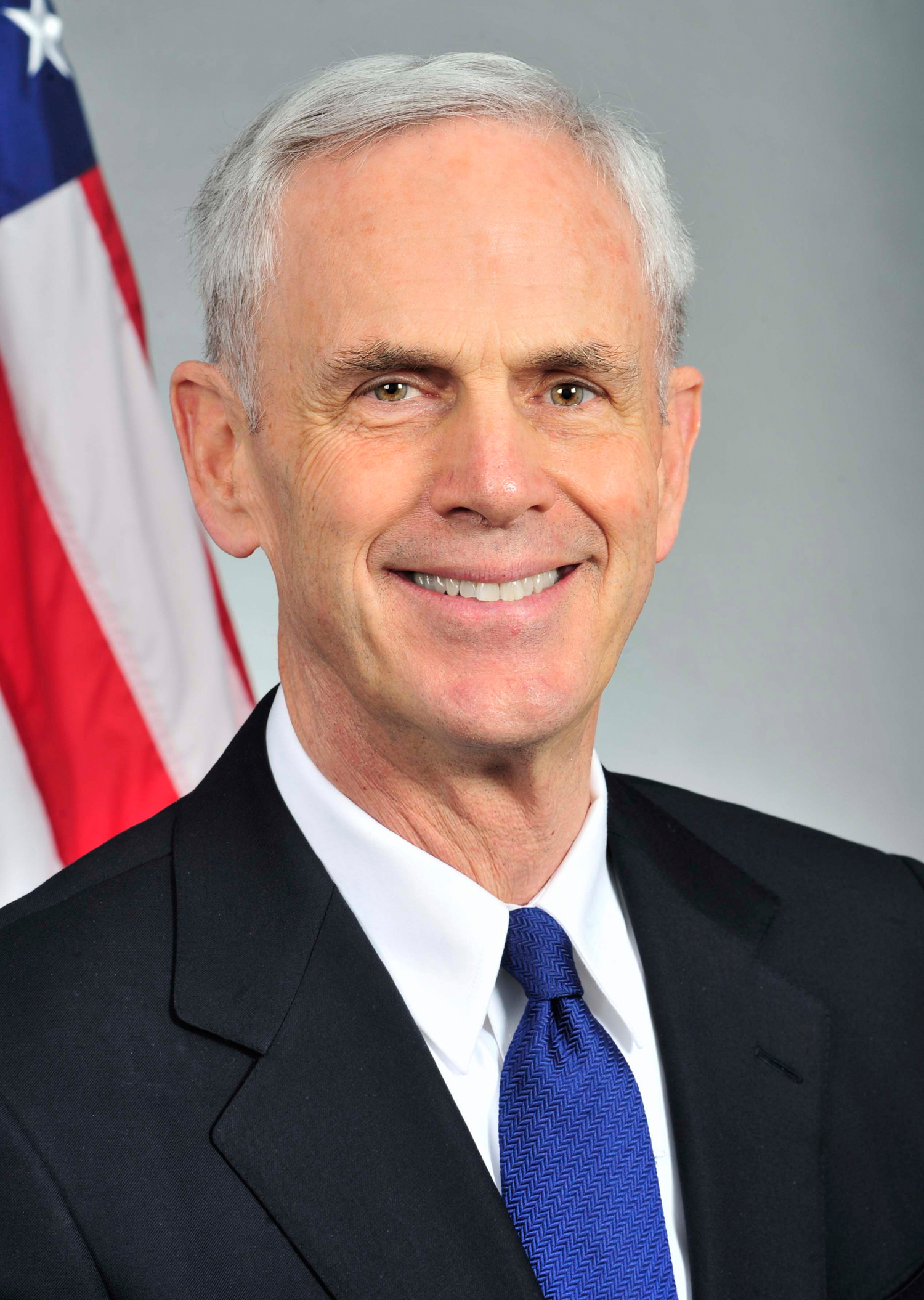
- Official portrait, 2011

37th United States Secretary of Commerce
- In office October 21, 2011 – June 21, 2012; On leave: June 11, 2012 – June 21, 2012
- President: Barack Obama
- Deputy: Rebecca Blank
- Preceded by: Rebecca Blank (acting)
- Succeeded by: Rebecca Blank (acting)

Personal details
- Born: John Edgar Bryson; July 24, 1943 New York City, U.S.
- Died: May 13, 2025 (aged 81) San Marino, California, U.S.
- Party: Democratic
- Education: Stanford University (BA); Yale University (JD)
- Bryson's voice Bryson about the America COMPETES website. Recorded December 21, 2011

John Edgar Bryson (July 24, 1943 – May 13, 2025) was an American businessman, lawyer and politician. He served as United States Secretary of Commerce from 2011 until 2012, the 37th person to hold the post since its establishment in 1913. He took a leave of absence in June 2012 after a pair of vehicular accidents related to seizures and subsequently resigned. Previously he was chairman, chief executive officer, and president of Edison International, the parent company of Southern California Edison and director of The Boeing Company. He co-founded the Natural Resources Defense Council with fellow Yale alumni in 1970.

== Early life and education ==
Bryson was born in New York City on July 24, 1943. His father operated a sawmill. He graduated from Cleveland High School in Portland, Oregon, in 1961. He received his bachelor's degree from Stanford University in 1965 and his Juris Doctor (J.D.) degree from Yale Law School in 1969.

== Career ==
In 1970, with other recent Yale Law graduates, Bryson helped found and served as legal counsel for the Natural Resources Defense Council. From 1976 until 1979, Bryson served as chairman of the California State Water Resources Control Board, and from 1979 until 1982, he served as president of the California Public Utilities Commission. In 1983, Bryson worked for the law firm of Morrison & Foerster in the San Francisco office. Bryson joined Edison International in 1984, and served as director from 1990 until his retirement on July 31, 2008.

Bryson was a director of The Boeing Company, W. M. Keck Foundation, and The Walt Disney Company, and a former Director/Trustee for three Western Asset Management funds at Legg Mason. He served on a number of educational, environmental and other nonprofit boards, including chairman of the California Business Roundtable, a trustee of Stanford University, a trustee of California Institute of Technology, co-chairman of the Pacific Council on International Policy, and chairman of the Public Policy Institute of California.

== Secretary of Commerce ==
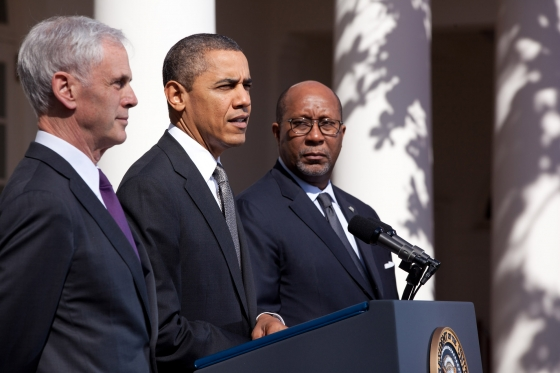
Then-Secretary Bryson, along with President Barack Obama and U.S. Trade Representative Ron Kirk at a press conference in the rose garden of the White House in March 2012.

On May 31, 2011, President Barack Obama nominated Bryson to succeed Gary Locke as the United States Secretary of Commerce. Citing Bryson's environmental views, United States Senator Jim Inhofe, a Republican from Oklahoma, put a hold on his nomination in July. The Senate later reached a unanimous consent agreement to vote on Bryson's nomination, and the Senate confirmed Bryson by a 74–26 vote on October 20, 2011. He was sworn in on October 21, 2011, becoming the 37th Secretary of the Department of Commerce.

As Secretary of Commerce, Bryson co-chaired the White House Office of Manufacturing Policy with Gene Sperling.

=== 2012 traffic accidents and resignation ===
On June 9, 2012, Bryson was involved in a pair of car crashes in San Gabriel, California and Rosemead, California, which were investigated as possible felony hit and run. He is said to have been found unconscious at the site of the second crash. A Department of Commerce spokesperson confirmed he was involved in a crash, and said Bryson had suffered from a seizure.

After announcing in a memo that he was taking a medical leave of absence, with Deputy Secretary of Commerce Rebecca Blank taking over as Acting Secretary of Commerce, Bryson announced on June 21, 2012, his resignation from the post of Secretary of Commerce, because, "the work that [Commerce employees] do to help America’s entrepreneurs and businesses build our economy and create jobs is more important now than ever and I have come to the conclusion that I need to step down to prevent distractions from this critical mission."

Los Angeles County prosecutors announced on July 3, 2012, that no criminal charges would be pursued, as the collisions resulted from the cognitive effect of unexpected seizure.

== Later life ==
Bryson joined the Woodrow Wilson International Center for Scholars as a Distinguished Senior Public Policy Scholar in October 2012.

== Personal life and death ==
Bryson was married to Louise Henry Bryson. Their four daughters graduated from the Polytechnic School in Pasadena, California. Bryson and his wife both served on the school's Board of Trustees. Bryson and his wife resided in San Marino, California.

Bryson died at home in San Marino, California, on May 13, 2025, at the age of 81.

Business positions
Preceded by Howard Allen	Chief Executive Officer of Edison International; 1990–2008	Succeeded by Theodore Craver
Political offices
Preceded by Rebecca Blank; Acting	United States Secretary of Commerce; 2011–2012	Succeeded by Rebecca Blank; Acting
