= John Hanson Twombly =

President of University of Wisconsin–Madison (1814–1893)

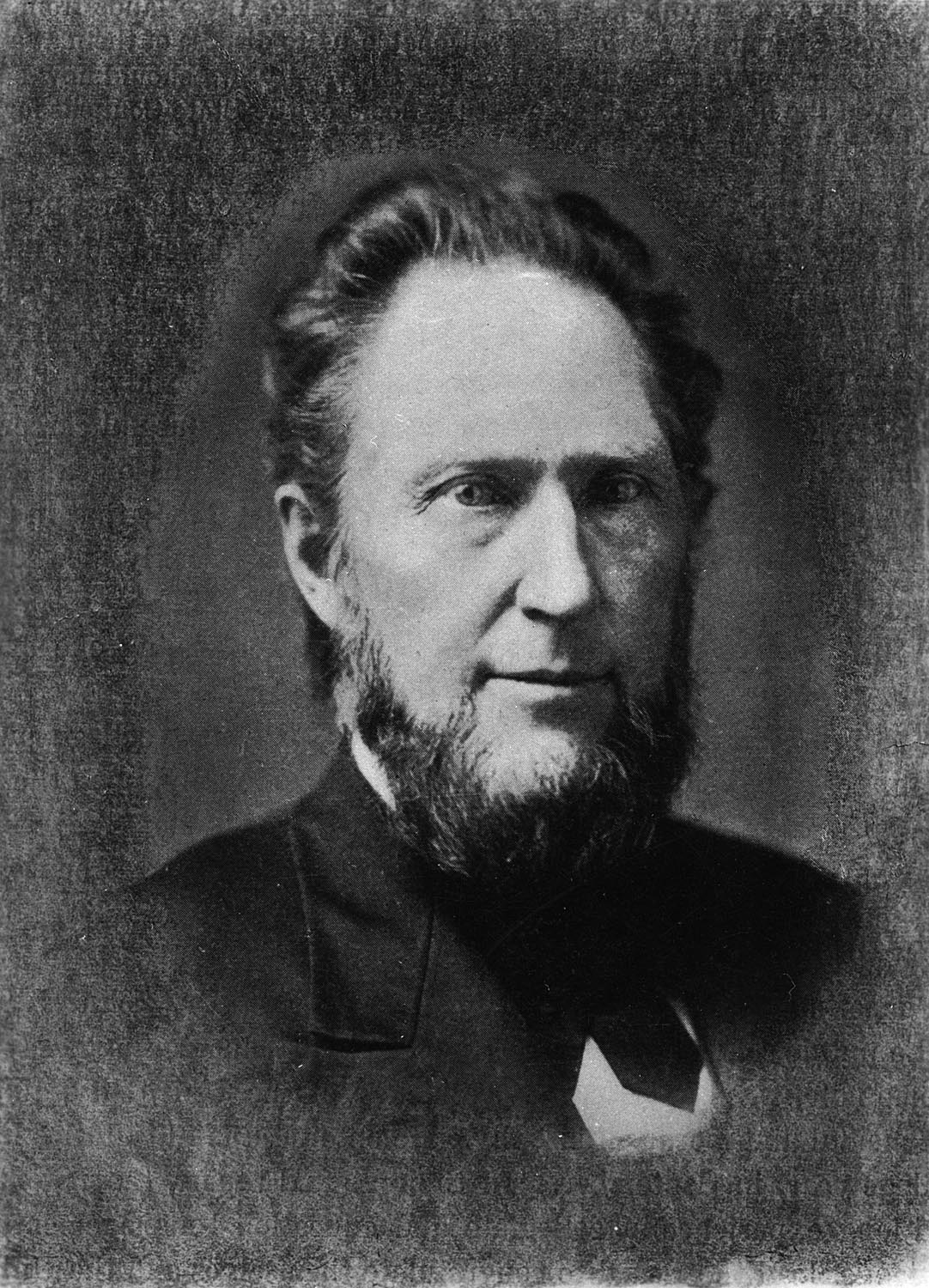

President of the University of Wisconsin–Madison
- In office 1871–1874
- Preceded by: Paul Chadbourne
- Succeeded by: John Bascom

Personal details
- Born: July 19, 1814 Rochester, New Hampshire, United States
- Died: January 1, 1893 (aged 78) Newton Lower Falls, Massachusetts, United States
- Education: Wesleyan University

John Hanson Twombly (July 19, 1814 – January 1, 1893) was a Methodist minister and the fourth president of the University of Wisconsin. He was known as an advocate for co-education and women's education, which led to tensions with the university regents and, ultimately, his ouster.

== Early life and career ==
John Hanson Twombly was born on July 19, 1814, in Rochester, New Hampshire. He was mostly self-educated and worked through his youth. In 1843, he graduated from Wesleyan University and became a Methodist minister. He taught at Wesleyan University from 1843 to 1845. Twombly married Betsy Dow, the daughter of a Vermont minister, on November 26, 1844. He worked at Massachusetts churches and became an overseer at Harvard College from 1855 to 1867. He also worked as the New England Education Society secretary from 1857 to 1871, the American Institute director from 1868 to 1870, and Charlestown, Massachusetts, public schools superintendent from 1866 to 1870.

== Madison ==
Twombly was elected to the University of Wisconsin–Madison presidency by the UW regents on June 30, 1871, for a September start. He was the university's fourth president. Samuel Fallows, UW class of 1859 and a local Reformed Episcopal Church bishop, was Twombly's main advocate. The regents thought he would raise funds for the university. He was known as a powerful speaker and advocated for co-education against the interests of the regents. The regents withheld some of his executive power due to their doubt, and eventually asked him to resign in June 1873. He refused and their case was brought to the Wisconsin Legislature, who supported Twombly along with the public and students. He never found the favor of the faculty. Twombly resigned on January 21, 1874 in response to the regents' determination. His legacy includes his advocacy for women's education.

He became a minister again, and worked in Northeast churches. He died January 1, 1893, in Newton Lower Falls, Massachusetts.

== See also ==
- List of presidents and chancellors of the University of Wisconsin–Madison

Academic offices
Preceded by Paul Chadbourne	President of the University of Wisconsin–Madison; 1871–1874	Succeeded by John Bascom
