= McCoy Farmhouse (Fitchburg, Wisconsin) =

Historic house in Wisconsin, United States

- U.S. National Register of Historic Places
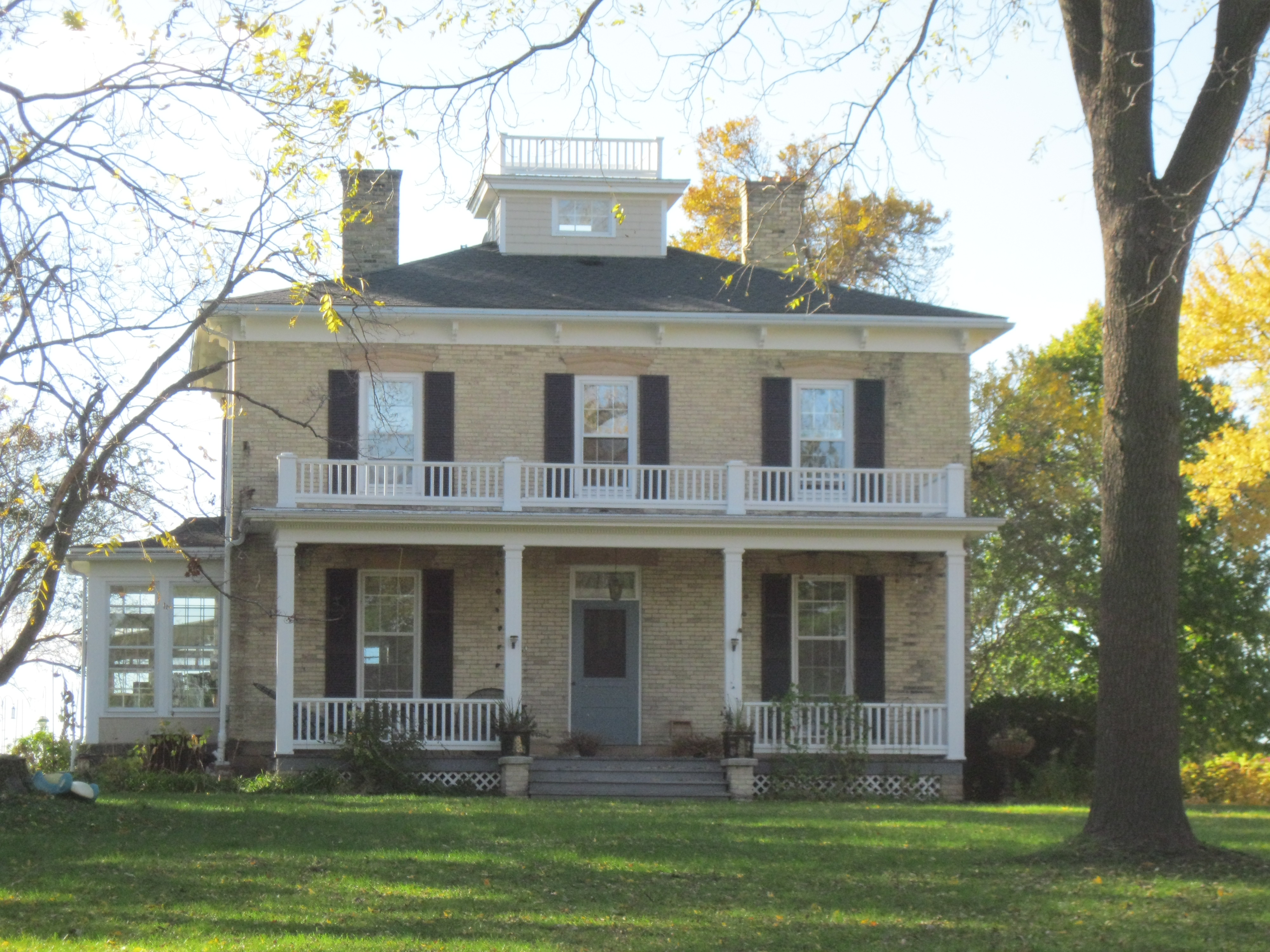

- Location within Wisconsin Location within the United States
- Location: 2925 Syene Rd., Fitchburg, Wisconsin
- Coordinates: 43°0′51″N 89°23′49″W
- Built: 1861
- Architectural style: Italianate
- NRHP reference No.: 80000124
- Added to NRHP: May 29, 1980

The McCoy Farmhouse is a historic house located at 2925 Syene Road in Fitchburg, Wisconsin. The Italianate farmhouse was built in 1861 on an early Wisconsin tobacco farm. From 1949 to 1978 microbiologist Elizabeth McCoy lived there. In 1980 the house was added to the National Register of Historic Places.

== History ==
In 1846 Henry Yager bought a 160-acre tract of land which included the parcel the house is built on and began farming. In 1853 two men from Ohio - Ralph Pomeroy and Jacob R. Hiestand - tried growing tobacco on ten acres of Yager's land, and it produced "a very large growth, estimated to yield at least a tone [sic] per acre." This is believed to be one of the first successful tobacco crops in Wisconsin. During the American Civil War, the farm experienced a boom when tobacco from what had become the Confederate States of America became unavailable.

Benjamin Brown purchased the farm from Yager in 1861 and built the farmhouse in the same year. As Brown's land was already prepared for tobacco farming, his farm was more successful than other area farms, and its value increased fivefold by his death in 1874. By this time, Dane County led the state in tobacco production, a status it held through 1911 when the farm ceased its tobacco production.

In 1949, University of Wisconsin–Madison microbiologist Elizabeth McCoy moved into the house. McCoy, a full professor at the university, was one of the first prominent female microbiologists. McCoy's work included bacterial research, studies of the microbiology of water bodies, and penicillin research which led to the discovery of the first commonly used strain of the drug. McCoy died in 1978 and left her house to the Wisconsin Alumni Research Foundation with the intent that it be preserved.

== Architecture ==
The two-story Italianate house is built from cream-colored brick which Brown imported from Milwaukee. The front facade features a central entrance and tall windows with stone lintels. A long front porch originally extended along the facade; while it had been replaced by a smaller porch by the time of the house's National Register nomination, another long porch has since been constructed. The house's hip roof is surrounded by a bracketed cornice and topped by a small cupola. A two-story wing extends from the back of the house.
