= Biddy Martin =

American academic administrator

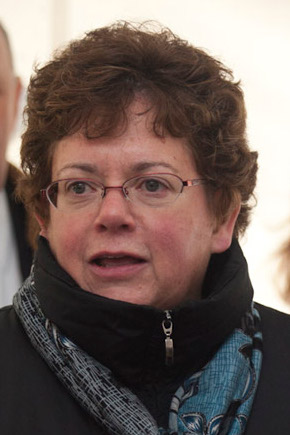
- Martin in 2011

19th President of Amherst College
- In office August 1, 2011 – July 31, 2022
- Preceded by: Anthony Marx
- Succeeded by: Michael A. Elliott

8th Chancellor of the University of Wisconsin-Madison
- In office September 1, 2008 – July 17, 2011
- Preceded by: John D. Wiley
- Succeeded by: David Ward (interim); Rebecca Blank

Personal details
- Born: Carolyn Arthur Martin; 1951 (age 74–75)
- Education: College of William and Mary (BA); Middlebury College (MA); University of Wisconsin, Madison (PhD)
- Nickname: Biddy

Academic background
- Thesis: The death of "god," the limits of "man," and the meanings of "woman": the work and the legends of Lou Andreas-Salome (1985)

Academic work
- Discipline: German literature
- Institutions: Cornell University; University of Wisconsin–Madison; Amherst College

Carolyn Arthur "Biddy" Martin (born 1951) is an American academic and author who was the 19th president of Amherst College in Amherst, Massachusetts, from 2011 to 2022.

Before becoming the president at Amherst College, she was the eighth chancellor of the University of Wisconsin–Madison from 2008 to 2011, succeeding John D. Wiley. She was the seventh graduate of UW–Madison to serve as its chancellor, and the first alumna to hold the position. She was also the university's second female chancellor, after Donna Shalala, and also the university's first openly lesbian chancellor.

Before becoming chancellor at the University of Wisconsin–Madison, she was Provost of Cornell University in Ithaca, New York from July 1, 2000 until August 31, 2008. As provost, Martin served as chief academic officer and chief operating officer, providing leadership for deans of Cornell’s 14 colleges and schools, as well as a number of centers and faculty advisory councils. She helped manage the institution’s academic programs, executive budgets, capital budgets and operating plans. Martin worked on Cornell's academic faculty for 15 years prior to her appointment as provost.

== Early life and education ==
Martin grew up in Timberlake, Virginia, just outside Lynchburg. The women in her family shared the name Carolyn, so Martin was nicknamed "Buck", "Boolie", and "Biddy". She graduated from Brookville High School in 1969, where she was valedictorian and set the school scoring record for girls' basketball. She received her undergraduate degree from the College of William and Mary in 1973, where she was a member of Phi Beta Kappa. She then obtained an M.A. in German literature from Middlebury College and received her Ph.D. in German literature in 1985 from the University of Wisconsin–Madison.

== Career ==
Martin joined the faculty at Cornell in 1985.

In 1991, she was promoted to associate professor in the Department of German Studies with a joint appointment in the Women’s Studies Program. She served as chair of the Department of German Studies from 1994 to 1997, and in 1997 was promoted to full Professor. In 1996, she was appointed Senior Associate Dean in the College of Arts and Sciences, a position she held until 2000. Between 2000 and 2008, she assumed the role as Cornell's Provost. She served as Chancellor of UW-Madison from 2008 to 2011. In 2018, she was elected a Fellow of the Harvard Corporation, which oversees Harvard University.

Martin is the author of numerous articles and two books—one on a literary and cultural figure in the Freud circle, Lou Andreas-Salomé, and the other on gender theory.

In 2012, during Martin's tenure as president of Amherst College, twenty-year-old student Trey Malone committed suicide, reportedly as a result of the school's mishandling of his sexual assault by another student. Malone's suicide note, which was published by The Good Men Project, alleged that President Martin's first question to the student upon meeting him to discuss the assault was: "Have you handled your drinking problem?" The purported mishandling of Malone's case and his subsequent suicide raised the question within the media of victim blaming by college administrators around the country.

In July 2022, Martin stepped down as president of Amherst College but remains on the faculty as a professor of German and Sexuality, Women's and Gender Studies.

== Major initiatives ==
=== Cornell (2000–2008) ===
During her tenure as provost, Martin led a faculty salary-improvement program, oversaw Cornell's interdisciplinary Life Sciences Initiative, authorized a National Science Foundation ADVANCE grant proposal to enhance recruitment and retention of women in science and engineering and established and developed a budget for Cornell's Center for a Sustainable Future.

==== Financial Aid Initiative ====
In 2008, Martin announced a financial aid initiative aimed at eliminating need-based loans for all undergraduate students from families with incomes under $75,000. The purpose of the initiative was to make it possible for new students to graduate debt-free.

==== New Student Reading Project ====
Martin started a reading project for incoming students, recruiting more than 200 faculty volunteers to lead small-group discussions with new students. The project has become a collaborative activity with the city of Ithaca.

==== Joan and Sanford Weill Life Sciences Building ====
Martin oversaw the $150 million creation of the Joan and Sanford Weill Life Sciences Building, a 250,000-square-foot (23,000 m^{2}) building that serves as the university's hub for life sciences and interdisciplinary collaborations. It is home to the Weill Institute for Cell and Molecular Biology and the Department of Biomedical Engineering.

=== University of Wisconsin–Madison (2008–2011) ===
As chancellor, Martin led successful initiatives to increase need-based financial aid, improve undergraduate education, and enhance research administration. The Madison Initiative for Undergraduates promoted student advising, innovations in undergraduate programs, and faculty diversity. Martin also spearheaded an effort to gain greater operating flexibility and increased autonomy for Wisconsin’s flagship campus. Martin advocated for diversity during her tenure. At the 2008 Diversity Forum, she closed the event stating, "We are a plural people whose joint efforts are required to address the world's problems. ... Interactions are key to realizing our full potential as human beings and groups."

==== Madison Initiative for Undergraduates ====
Martin's first major policy initiative as Chancellor was the implementation of an incremental four-year tuition increase plan called the Madison Initiative for Undergraduates. This plan pays for more undergraduate course offerings, additional faculty and staff to teach those courses, enhanced student services, and supplemental (and eventually complete) financial assistance for students whose families make under $80,000 a year. The plan was approved by the Board of Regents on May 8, 2009.

==== Go Big Read! ====
Martin has also created the university's first Common Read program, known as Go Big Read!, which began in Fall 2009. The inaugural selected title was In Defense of Food: An Eater's Manifesto, by Michael Pollan. For Fall 2010, the announced selection was The Immortal Life of Henrietta Lacks by Rebecca Skloot.

==== New Badger Partnership ====
In 2010, Martin initiated a series of public fora concerning what she described as a "new business model for UW–Madison". This proposal, called the "New Badger Partnership", was purportedly intended to safeguard the university finance and help mend the state's fiscal gaps. As part of this proposal, Martin called for "greater flexibility for the university, combined with reasonable forms of accountability and more effective operations" which "can strengthen the university's position and its ability to serve the state." Among its early stated aims were the ability to set market-based tuition, provide more financial aid and compensate faculty separately from pay plans for other state agencies. The most radical feature of this plan involved the separation of UW-Madison from the University of Wisconsin System, and redesignating it as a public authority governed by an independent Board of Trustees. The plan, however, proved polarizing, and Martin left for Amherst the following year.

== Publications ==
=== Books ===
- Woman and Modernity: The (Life)Styles of Lou Andreas-Salomé, Cornell University Press, 1991.
- Femininity Played Straight: The Significance of Being Lesbian, Routledge Press, 1996.

=== Other ===
- "Sex Change vs. Social Change", Review of The Transsexual Empire, by Janice G. Raymond, Bread & Roses, vol. 2, no. 3, 1980, pp. 41–41.
- "Feminism, Criticism, and Foucault", New German Critique, vol. 27, Autumn, 1982, pp. 3–30.
- "A Study in Contrasts", Review of Gynesis: Configurations of Women and Modernity, by Alice Jardine, The Woman's Review of Books, vol. 4, no. 1., Oct., 1986, p. 22.
- "Lesbian Identity and Autobiographical Difference[s]", Life/Lines: Theorizing Women’s Autobiography, edited by Bella Brodzki and Celeste Schenck, Cornell University Press, 1988, pp. 77–104.
- "The Hobo, the Fairy, and the Quarterback", Profession, 1994, pp. 15–20.
- "Sexualities without Genders and Other Queer Utopias", Diacritics, vol. 24, no. 2/3, Critical Crossings (Summer–Autumn, 1994), pp. 104–121.
- "Teaching Literature, Changing Cultures”, PMLA, vol. 112, no. 1, Special Topic: The Teaching of Literature (Jan., 1997), pp. 7–25.
- "Success and Its Failures", Feminist Consequences: Theory for the New Century, edited by Elisabeth Bronfen and Misha Kavka, Columbia University Press, 2001, pp. 353–380
- Mohanty, Chandra Talpade. “What’s Home Got to Do with It? (With Biddy Martin)”, Feminism without Borders: Decolonizing Theory, Practicing Solidarity, Duke University Press, 2003, pp. 85–105
- "The Work of Love", New German Critique, no. 95, Special Issue for David Bathrick (Spring - Summer, 2005), pp. 27–36.

== Personal life ==
Martin is married to historian Gabriele Strauch.

Academic offices
Preceded by Anthony Marx	19th President of Amherst College; 2011 – 2022	Succeeded by Michael A. Elliott
Preceded by John D. Wiley	10th Chancellor of the University of Wisconsin–Madison; 2008 – 2011	Succeeded by David Ward
Preceded by Don Michael Randel	Provost of Cornell University; 2000 – 2008	Succeeded by W. Kent Fuchs
