= Michael A. Elliott =

American literary scholar

20th President of Amherst College
- Incumbent
- Assumed office August 1, 2022
- Preceded by: Biddy Martin

Personal details
- Education: Amherst College (BA); Columbia University (PhD)

Academic background
- Thesis: From Race to Culture in Realist America (1998)
- Doctoral advisor: Robert Ferguson

Academic work
- Discipline: English literature
- Institutions: Emory University; Amherst College

Michael A. Elliott is an American scholar of English literature and academic administrator. He became the 20th president of Amherst College on August 1, 2022.

== Education and career ==
Elliott received his B.A. from Amherst College in 1992 and his Ph.D. from Columbia University in 1998 with distinction in English and comparative literature.

=== Emory University ===
Elliott joined the Emory University faculty in 1998. He held a number of administrative posts since joining Emory: he was senior associate dean for faculty (2009–2014), followed by executive associate dean (2014–2015), and interim dean (2016–2017). From 2017 to 2022, he was dean of the Emory College of Arts and Sciences. As dean of Emory College, Elliott led initiatives aimed at diversifying the college faculty and student body and increasing funding for undergraduate research and professional development. He also ran the largest fundraising campaign in Emory College and university history.

Elliott also served as Charles Howard Candler Professor of English at Emory. With Priscilla Wald, Elliott edited The Oxford History of the Novel in English: Volume Six: The American Novel 1870–1940. With Claudia Stokes, he edited American Literary Studies: A Methodological Reader. Elliott has also been an editor of The Norton Anthology of American Literature.

=== President of Amherst College ===
Elliot became the 20th president of Amherst College on August 1, 2022.

== Selected works ==
=== Books ===
- The Culture Concept: Writing and Difference in the Age of Realism (2002)
- Custerology: The Enduring Legacy of the Indian Wars and George Armstrong Custer (2007)

=== Articles ===
- “‘This Indian Bait’: Samson Occom and the Voice of Liminality.” Early American Literature, vol. 29, no. 3, 1994, pp. 233–53.
- Review of Northeastern Indian Lives, edited by Robert S. Grumet, Biography, vol. 20, no. 3, 1997, pp. 350–53.
- “Ethnography, Reform, and the Problem of the Real: James Mooney’s Ghost-Dance Religion”, American Quarterly, vol. 50, no. 2, 1998, pp. 201–33.
- Review of That the People Might Live: Native American Literature and Native American Community, by Jace Weaver, American Literature, vol. 70, no. 4, 1998, pp. 900–01.
- “Telling the Difference: Nineteenth-Century Legal Narratives of Racial Taxonomy”, Law & Social Inquiry, vol. 24, no. 3, 1999, pp. 611–36.
- Review of The Limits of Multiculturalism: Interrogating the Origins of American Anthropology, by Scott Michaelsen, Studies in American Indian Literatures, vol. 12, no. 3, 2000, pp. 92–95.
- Review of Race, Work, and Desire in American Literature, by Michele Birnbaum, South Atlantic Review, vol. 69, no. 3/4, 2004, pp. 129–31.
- “Indian Patriots on Last Stand Hill”, American Quarterly, vol. 58, no. 4, 2006, pp. 987–1015.
- Review of Red Land, Red Power: Grounding Knowledge in the American Indian Novel, by Sean Kicummah Teuton, The Journal of American History, vol. 95, no. 4, 2009, pp. 1247–48.
- “Indians, Incorporated.” American Literary History, vol. 19, no. 1, 2007, pp. 141–59.
- “Other Times: Herman Melville, Lewis Henry Morgan, and Ethnographic Writing in the Antebellum United States”, Criticism, vol. 49, no. 4, 2007, pp. 481–503.
- “Our Memorials, Ourselves”, American Quarterly, vol. 63, no. 1, 2011, pp. 229–40.
- Review of A Misplaced Massacre: Struggling over the Memory of Sand Creek, by Ari Kelman, The Journal of American History, vol. 100, no. 3, 2013, pp. 798–800.
- “Not over: The Nineteenth-Century Indian Wars”, Reviews in American History, vol. 44, no. 2, 2016, pp. 277–83.

Academic offices
Preceded by Biddy Martin	President of Amherst College; 2022 – present	Succeeded by Incumbent
