= Edwin Broun Fred =

American bacteriologist & academic (1887–1981)

Edwin Broun Fred (March 22, 1887 – January 16, 1981) was an American bacteriologist and academic who was the 15th president of the University of Wisconsin–Madison, serving from 1945 to 1958. Born in Virginia, Fred studied at the Virginia Polytechnic Institute and the University of Göttingen. After briefly teaching at Virginia Polytechnic, Fred took a position with Wisconsin. He was dean of the graduate school from 1934 until 1943, then was dean of the College of Agriculture until 1945. He ascended to the presidency and was known for his response to the postwar growth in admissions. Fred was the president of the Society of American Bacteriologists in 1932.

== Biography ==
Edwin Broun Fred was born on March 22, 1887, in Middleburg, Virginia. He attended Randolph-Macon Academy in Front Royal, then attended the Virginia Polytechnic Institute. He received a bachelor's degree in 1907 and a Master of Science in 1908. He then studied at the University of Göttingen in Germany, where he received a Ph.D. in bacteriology in 1911. Virginia Polytechnic then hired him as an assistant professor, where he taught from 1912 to 1913. Fred was then hired by the University of Wisconsin. He was elected in 1918 a fellow of the American Association for the Advancement of Science. His doctoral students include Ira Baldwin, Elizabeth McCoy, William Bowen Sarles, Edward Tatum, and Perry William Wilson.

In 1927, he guided Maria Löhnis who visited his lab from the Netherlands and performed research on Rhizobium bacteria.

In 1934, Fred was named dean of the graduate school at Wisconsin. During World War II, he chaired a study of biological warfare sponsored by the National Academy of Sciences. Later, he was a consultant to the Secretary of War For this work, he was awarded the Medal for Merit. He was elected to the United States National Academy of Sciences in 1931. In 1943, Fred was named dean of the College of Agriculture and director of the Agricultural Experiment Station. Fred was elected to the American Philosophical Society in 1945. That same year, Fred was named president of the university, a position he held for thirteen years. His presidency is noted for the extension centers he develop to handle postwar enrollment increases.

Fred married Rosa Helen Parrott on June 21, 1913; they had two children. He was the president of the Society of American Bacteriologists in 1932. Fred was vice chair of the National Science Board and a member of the National Advisory Health Council and the Advisory Board Commission of Educational Exchange. He also served on the board of trustees of the Carnegie Foundation for the Advancement of Teaching from 1946 to 1958. He died in Madison on January 16, 1981, and was buried at Sharon Cemetery in Middleburg.

== Publications ==
- Laboratory Manual of Soil Bacteriology (1916)
- Textbook of Agricultural Bacteriology (1923)
- with A. L. Whiting and E. G. Hastings: Root Nodule Bacteria of Leguminosae (November 1926, Research Bulletin 72, Agricultural Experiment Station of the University of Wisconsin)
- Laboratory Manual of Microbiology (1928)
- with Ira Baldwin and Elizabeth McCoy: Root Nodule Bacteria and Leguminous Plants (1932); 2002 reprint. UW-Madison Libraries Parallel Press. 2002. ISBN 9781893311282.

Academic offices
Preceded by Clarence Addison Dykstra	President of the University of Wisconsin–Madison; 1945–1958	Succeeded by Conrad Elvehjem
