= John D. Wiley =

American physicist (born 1942)

John Duncan Wiley (born March 23, 1942, in Evansville, Indiana) is a faculty member and former chancellor of the University of Wisconsin–Madison. Wiley was named the 28th Chancellor of the University on November 10, 2000, and assumed office on January 1, 2001. He stepped down as chancellor and returned to the faculty on September 1, 2008. From November 1, 2008, through November 2011, he served as interim director of the Wisconsin Institute for Discovery.

== Career overview ==
Wiley has had a long career with UW–Madison, with nearly 40 years of involvement as either a student, faculty member, or administrator. From 1994 to 2000, he served as Wisconsin's Provost and Vice Chancellor for Academic Affairs. Prior to that, he was the university's Vice Chancellor for Research and Dean of the Graduate School and the Associate Dean for Research in the College of Engineering.

== Research ==
A research physicist by training, Wiley's academic work has focused on research in semiconductors and solid state physics. He received his bachelor's degree in physics from Indiana University in 1964, and master's and doctoral degrees in physics in 1965 and 1968 from UW–Madison on a National Science Foundation Fellowship. He returned to UW–Madison as a faculty member in the College of Engineering in 1975, after having worked with Bell Telephone Laboratories and at the Max Planck Institute in Stuttgart, Germany as an awardee of the Alexander von Humboldt Senior U.S. Service Award for Research and Training.

== Chancellor tenure ==
His tenure as Chancellor was distinguished by record-breaking fund-raising efforts and a strong emphasis on strategic planning. Wiley attracted alumni and institutional investment to several projects on campus, most notably the Wisconsin Institutes of Discovery. A number of new construction projects were begun during his tenure, including two new dormitories, a new Microbial Sciences Building, and major expansions to the Business and Medical Schools. He also commissioned an expansive Campus Master Plan that would guide physical development of the campus for the next decade. Central to this plan is the creation of an East Campus Arts Corridor, which required the renovation or demolition of several existing campus buildings. Wiley, throughout his tenure, also sponsored and funding a number of different performing and visual arts activities both on and off campus, including a series of performances by artists across campus called "The Chancellor Presents . . . " Wiley additionally devoted considerable attention early in his chancellorship to curbing binge drinking on campus through a grant from the Robert Wood Johnson Foundation.

Academic offices
Preceded by David Ward	Chancellor of the University of Wisconsin–Madison; 2001 — September 2008	Succeeded by Carolyn Martin
