= Paul A. Chadbourne =

American politician (1823–1883)

Paul Ansel Chadbourne
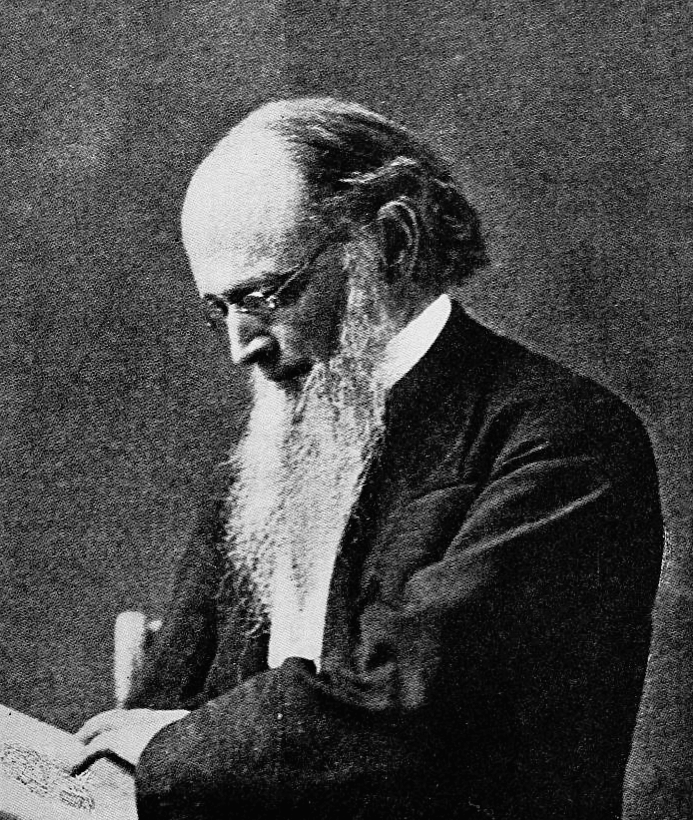
- Paul A. Chadbourne, circa 1882

President of the Massachusetts Agricultural College (now the University of Massachusetts Amherst)
- In office 1866 – 1867, 1882–1883

President of the University of Wisconsin (now the University of Wisconsin-Madison)
- In office 1867–1870

President of Williams College
- In office 1872–1881

Personal details
- Born: October 21, 1823 North Berwick, Maine, U.S.
- Died: February 23, 1883 (aged 59) New York, New York, U.S.
- Spouse: Elizabeth Sawyer Page
- Education: Williams College (B.A.), (LL.D.); Berkshire Medical School (M.D.) Amherst College (D.D.)

Paul Ansel Chadbourne (October 21, 1823 – February 23, 1883) was an American educator and naturalist who served as President of University of Wisconsin from 1867 to 1870, and President of Williams College from 1872 until his resignation in 1881. He was also the second President of the Massachusetts Agricultural College (later University of Massachusetts) in 1867 and again from 1882 until his death in 1883.

== Early life ==
Chadbourne was born in North Berwick, Maine, and attended school at Phillips Exeter Academy. He graduated from Williams College, where he was a member of The Kappa Alpha Society, and became valedictorian in 1848 with Phi Beta Kappa honors. Chadbourne earned his M.D. degree from Berkshire Medical College but never practiced medicine.

== Career ==
Chadbourne initially taught school in Freehold, New Jersey, until taking a position at Williams College, where he taught scientific subjects for fourteen years. At Williams College he was the Professor of Chemistry, Botany, and Natural History. Concurrently, he was professor at Bowdoin College, Maine Medical College, and Berkshire Medical School.

He was President of the Massachusetts Agricultural College from 1866 to 1867, and from 1882 to 1883. He was the President and Professor of Metaphysics at the University of Wisconsin from 1867 to 1870.

Chadbourne served as a member of the Republican party in the Massachusetts Senate from 1865 to 1866.

== Death and legacy ==
Following years of pulmonary problems, Chadbourne died on February 23, 1883, while serving as President of the Massachusetts Agricultural College.

Chadbourne House at Williams College is named after him.

Chadbourne Hall at the University of Wisconsin-Madison is named after him.

== Selected works ==
- Lectures on Natural History (1860)
- The Influence of History on Individual and National Action; Annual Address before the State Historical Society of Wisconsin (1868)
- Lectures on Natural Theology (1869)
- Inaugural Address (1872)
- Strength of Men and Stability of Nations; Baccalaureate Discourses (1873–1877)
- Strength of the Inward Man (1873)
- Him That Overcometh (1874)
- The Law of Service (1875)
- The Tree by the Rivers of Water (1876)
- The Stability of Nations (1877)
- The Hope of the Righteous (1877)
- Instinct: Its Office in the Animal Kingdom, and Its Relation to the Higher Powers in Man (1883)

Academic offices
| Preceded by Henry F. French | President of the Massachusetts Agricultural College; 1866-1867 | Succeeded by William S. Clark |
| Preceded by John W. Sterling | President of the University of Wisconsin; 1867-1870 | Succeeded by John Hanson Twombly |
| Preceded by Mark Hopkins | President of Williams College; 1872–1881 | Succeeded by Franklin Carter |
