= Under Secretary of Commerce for Economic Affairs =

Post in U.S. government

United States Under Secretary of Commerce for Economic Affairs
- Seal of the U.S. Department of Commerce

- Flag of an under secretary of commerce

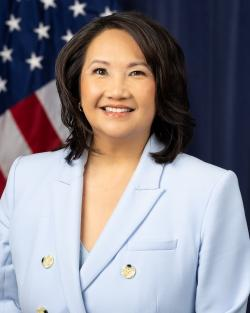
- Incumbent; Joyce Meyer since January 8, 2026
- Appointer: The president; with Senate advice and consent
- Constituting instrument: 15 U.S.C. § 1503a
- Formation: June 16, 1982
- Website: Official website

The under secretary of commerce for economic affairs, or USC(EA), is a high-ranking official in the United States Department of Commerce that serves as the principal adviser to the United States Secretary of Commerce on economic analysis.

The under secretary is appointed by the president of the United States and confirmed by the United States Senate to serve at the pleasure of the president. In October 2021, President Joe Biden nominated Jed Kolko to be under secretary. He was confirmed by the United States Senate on April 7, 2022, and sworn in on April 19. Kolko resigned in February 2024 and was succeeded by acting under secretary Oliver Wise.

== Overview ==
As the principal element of the Commerce Department for economic affairs, the under secretary provides timely economic analysis and disseminates national economic indicators. The under secretary serves as the department's representative to the president's Council of Economic Advisers, interagency panels on economic issues, and other government agencies concerned with economic matters. The under secretary's principal responsibilities include: economic forecasting, consultation with the private sector on economic and broad economic sectoral developments, and policy analysis and development in the areas of economic policy.

The under secretary oversees the United States Census Bureau and the Bureau of Economic Analysis. These two statistical agencies gather, calculate, and disseminate much demographic, social and economic data including reports on the nation's gross domestic product, retail sales, personal income, housing starts, inventory levels and international trade.

With the rank of under secretary, the USC(EA) is a Level III position within the Executive Schedule. Since January 2010, the annual rate of pay for Level III is $165,300.

== History ==
The position was created by an Act of Congress on June 16, 1982. The under secretary for economic affairs is fourth in the line of succession for secretary of commerce.

== List of officeholders ==
Name	Assumed office	Left office	Appointed by
Robert G. Dederick	1982	1983	Ronald Reagan
Sidney L. Jones	October 3, 1983	November 1985	Ronald Reagan
Robert T. Ortner	November 1985	June 16, 1986	Ronald Reagan
Robert T. Ortner	June 16, 1986	April 1989	Ronald Reagan
Michael R. Darby	July 26, 1989	January 1993	George H.W. Bush
Everett M. Ehrlich	1993	1997	Bill Clinton
Robert J. Shapiro	1997	March 2001	Bill Clinton
Kathleen Bell Cooper	October 1, 2001	2005	George W. Bush
Mark Doms(Acting)	2005	October 5, 2006	George W. Bush
Cynthia Glassman	October 5, 2006	January 20, 2009	George W. Bush
Rebecca Blank	June 9, 2009	March 29, 2012	Barack Obama
Mark Doms	January 3, 2013	September 18, 2015	Barack Obama
Justin Antonipillai (Acting)	January 2016	December 2016	Barack Obama
Brad Burke (Acting)	December 2016	August 2, 2017	Barack Obama
Karen Dunn Kelley	August 2, 2017	November 18, 2018	Donald Trump
Brian C. Moyer (Acting)	November 18, 2018	March 2020	Donald Trump
Jed Kolko	April 19, 2022	February 2, 2024	Joe Biden
Oliver Wise (Acting)	February 2, 2024	August 30, 2025	Joe Biden
George Cook (Acting)	September 1, 2025	January 8, 2026	Donald Trump
Joyce Meyer	January 8, 2026	Present	Donald Trump

== Reporting officials ==
Officials reporting to the under secretary include:

- Chief Economist
- Director, Bureau of the Census
- Director, Bureau of Economic Analysis
