= Elizabeth McCoy (microbiologist) =

American microbiologist (1903–1978)

Elizabeth McCoy (February 1, 1903 – March 24, 1978) was an American microbiologist and a professor at the University of Wisconsin–Madison.

== Early life ==
She was born in Madison, Wisconsin, February 1, 1903. Her fascination with microbiology began early on the family farm where she lived with her family. Her parents, Esther Williamson and Cassius James McCoy, both attended college. Her mother was a professor and then an active practicing nurse for six years. Her mother taught her about household hygiene and techniques to best preserve food. Her father was a professor but for health reasons had to retire.

== Education ==
McCoy was able to further her interest by studying agricultural bacteriology at the University of Wisconsin as an undergraduate. Upon graduation in 1925, she was given the opportunity to work for the U.S. Department of Agriculture or continue her education and pursue her Ph.D. by working in Dr. Edwin Broun Fred's lab, future university president at UW Madison. She chose to pursue her Ph.D. and studied the applications of bacteriology. Her graduate work focused on a bacteria that could make acetone and butanol which proved to be useful for producing rubber. She received her Ph.D. from the University of Wisconsin in 1929.

== Development of a new and highly productive strain of penicillin ==
During World War II, researchers around the world were looking for ways to increase the production of penicillin. Professor Ken Raper, a bacteriologist at the USDA’s Northern Research Regional laboratory, was researching techniques to extract natural compounds from microbes that were necessary for increasing penicillin production. He was in search of a more productive strain of penicillin when the best strain was found growing on a moldy cantaloupe in a grocery store in Peoria, Illinois called NRRL- 1951.

She was sent NRRL-1951 along with other collaborators around the country. She identified a promising new mutant called X-1612 which was grown and tested by other biochemists. They found that exposing X-1612 to ultraviolet light led to more mutations in the mold which led to an even more productive penicillium strain called Q- 176. This isolated sample doubled the production of penicillin within a month and was very cost-effective.

Her new strain of penicillin produced 900 times as much as Alexander Fleming's strain; this discovery enabled to the drug's widespread commercial production. This led to improved growing methods of the world’s first antibiotic which was used to treat life-threatening infections suffered by allied troops.

== Career ==
In 1930, she joined the University of Wisconsin-Madison faculty after earning her degrees there, and was one of the first women to become a full professor there. She was one of the founding faculty members of the University of Wisconsin–Madison’s Department of Bacteriology, which later evolved into the Department of Medical Microbiology & Immunology. She was one of the first prominent women within the field.

During World War I, McCoy was studying chemicals useful to the production of rubber and characterized acetone/butyl-producing Clostridium bacteria. Clostridium is a genus of anaerobic, Gram-positive bacteria. Through more research of acetone/butanol microbial fermentations, her research led to the development of a phage-resistant Clostridium madisonni.

She was part of the team that first discovered Moorella thermoacetica, a model organism important to developing our understanding of the Acetyl Co-A metabolic pathway.

She continued research in antibiotics and was able to isolate the antibiotic oligomycin. Olygomycin is an inhibitor of ATP synthase and blocks protons from entering the membrane. Further research on oligomycin has led to compounds that are being studied in relation to cancer treatments. Her other research included work in soil microbiology, the microbiology of water bodies, and botulism.

She retired in 1973.

== Personal life ==
The McCoy Farmhouse in Fitchburg, where she lived from 1949 until her death, is listed on the National Register of Historic Places.

== Selected publications ==
- Edwin Broun Fred; Ira Baldwin; Elizabeth McCoy (1932), Root nodule bacteria and leguminous plants, Madison, Wikidata Q119292768
- Langlykke AF; Peterson WH; McCoy E (1 April 1935). "Products from the Fermentation of Glucose and Arabinose by Butyric Acid Anaerobes". Journal of Bacteriology. 29 (4): 333–347. doi:10.1128/jb.29.4.333-347.1935. ISSN 0021-9193. PMC 543601. PMID 16559792. Wikidata Q40877194.
- Elizabeth McCoy; L.S. McClung (20 February 1943). "The anaerobic Bacteria and their activities in nature and disease: A subject bibliography". Journal of the Society for the Bibliography of Natural History. 1 (12). University of California, Berkeley: University of California Press: 487–487. doi:10.3366/jsbnh.1943.1.12.487. ISSN 0037-9778. Wikidata Q96143866.
- T. L. Bott; J. S. Deffner; E. McCoy; E. M. Foster (1 March 1966). "Clostridium botulinum Type E in Fish from the Great Lakes". Journal of Bacteriology. 91 (3): 919–924. doi:10.1128/jb.91.3.919-924.1966. ISSN 0021-9193. PMC 315978. PMID 5326102. Wikidata Q40440088.
- Elizabeth McCoy (1972), Role of bacteria in the nitrogen cycle in lakes, United States: United States Environmental Protection Agency, Wikidata Q119292887
