= David Ward (university president) =

David Ward (born July 8, 1938, in Manchester, England) is a scholar in urban geography. He was the president of the American Council on Education from September 2001 to September 2008. In 2011, he was appointed Interim Chancellor of the University of Wisconsin–Madison, where he served a prior term as Chancellor from 1993 to 2001, Provost and Vice-Chancellor for Academic Affairs from 1989 to 2003, and Associate Dean of the Graduate School from 1980 to 1987.

A leading scholar in urban geography, Ward received his B.A.(1959) and M.A.(1961) from the University of Leeds before moving to the University of Wisconsin–Madison on a Fulbright Travel Award, and earning his doctorate there in 1963. After teaching at Carleton University and the University of British Columbia, Ward returned to UW–Madison in 1966.

Ward was born and raised in Manchester. He is married with two grown sons and seven grandchildren, two of whom are Wisconsin alumni. After his retirement from his second stint as chancellor, Ward and his wife Judith relocated to the Los Angeles area.

As chancellor, Ward oversaw a major overhaul of UW–Madison's information technology infrastructure, as well as the development of a cluster-hiring program called "The Madison Initiative Investment Plan". Ward's chancellorship also saw the creation of new undergraduate residential learning communities on campus and the construction and opening of the Kohl Center.

Ward has served as chairman of the Board of Trustees of the University Corporation for Advanced Internet Development, Chairman of the Government Relations Council of the National Association of State Universities and Land-Grant Colleges, and served on the Committee on Undergraduate Education of the Association of American Universities, the Science Coalition, and the Kellogg Commission on the Future of State and Land-Grant Universities.

In 2011, following Carolyn "Biddy" Martin's resignation to become president of Amherst College, Ward was appointed interim chancellor of UW-Madison to serve until a permanent replacement could be found. He served a two-year term from 2011-2013 until Rebecca Blank was hired.

Academic offices
Preceded by Donna Shalala	Chancellor of the University of Wisconsin–Madison; 1993 — 2001	Succeeded by John D. Wiley
Preceded by Carolyn Martin	Interim Chancellor of the University of Wisconsin–Madison; 2011 – 2013	Succeeded by Rebecca Blank
