= Hugh Edwin Young =

Hugh Edwin Young (May 3, 1917 – January 2, 2012) served as Chancellor of the University of Wisconsin-Madison from 1968 to 1977 and President of the University of Wisconsin System from 1977 to 1980. An economist, Young graduated from the University of Maine and the University of Wisconsin-Madison. As UW Chancellor, Young presided over a campus divided by the Vietnam War and student protests. He was born in Bonne Bay, Newfoundland (then British Dominion of Newfoundland) and moved to Maine with his family when he was 5. Young died in Madison, Wisconsin after a stroke.

== Personal life ==
Young was married with five children and predeceased by his wife (d. 1993).
