= Economics and Statistics Administration =

Former Federal Agency

Agency overview
- Formed: 1961
- Agency executive: Under Secretary for Economic Affairs
- Parent agency: Department of Commerce
- Child agencies: United States Census Bureau; Bureau of Economic Analysis

The Economics and Statistics Administration (ESA) was an agency within the United States Department of Commerce (DOC) that analyzed, disseminated, and reported on national economic and demographic data. It was dissolved in 2018.

Its three primary missions were the following:

1. Release and disseminate U.S. National Economic Indicators.
2. Oversee the missions of the United States Census Bureau (Census) and the Bureau of Economic Analysis (BEA).
3. Analyze and produce economic reports for the Department of Commerce and the Executive Branch.
