= Robert Clodius =

Robert LeRoy Clodius (March 10, 1921 – April 2, 2014) was an American educator and acting President of University of Wisconsin–Madison in 1970.

Born in Walla Walla, Washington, Clodius went to Whitman College. He then served in the United States Navy during World War II and went to officers school at Northwestern University. He then graduated from University of California, Berkeley. He then taught agricultural economics at University of Wisconsin–Madison and was vice president and then acting president in 1970. He retired in 1990. In 2000, Clodius and his wife moved to Rockford, Illinois where he died.
