= Perrinton, Michigan =

- Village
- Village of Perrinton
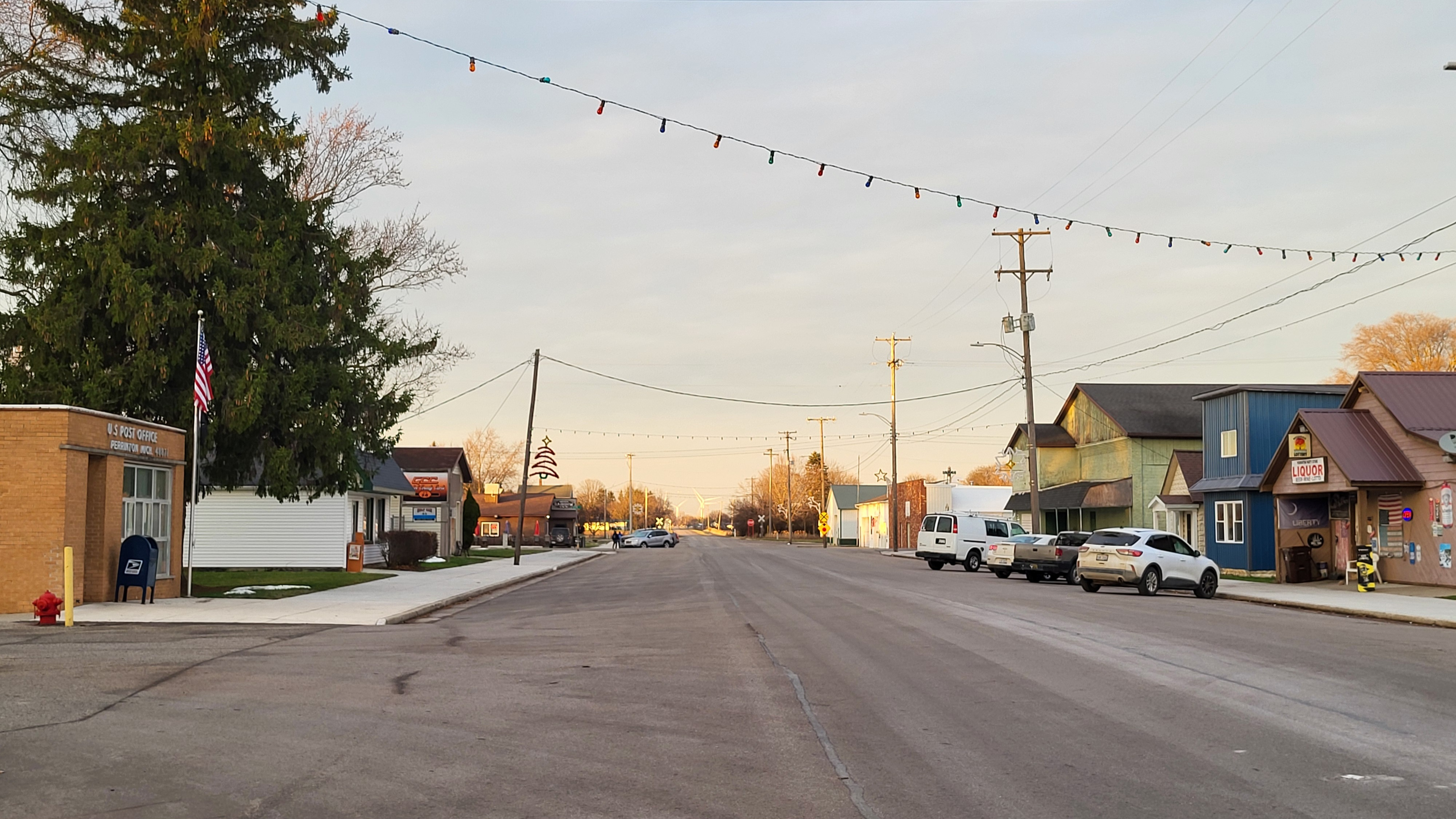
- Looking north along Robinson Street

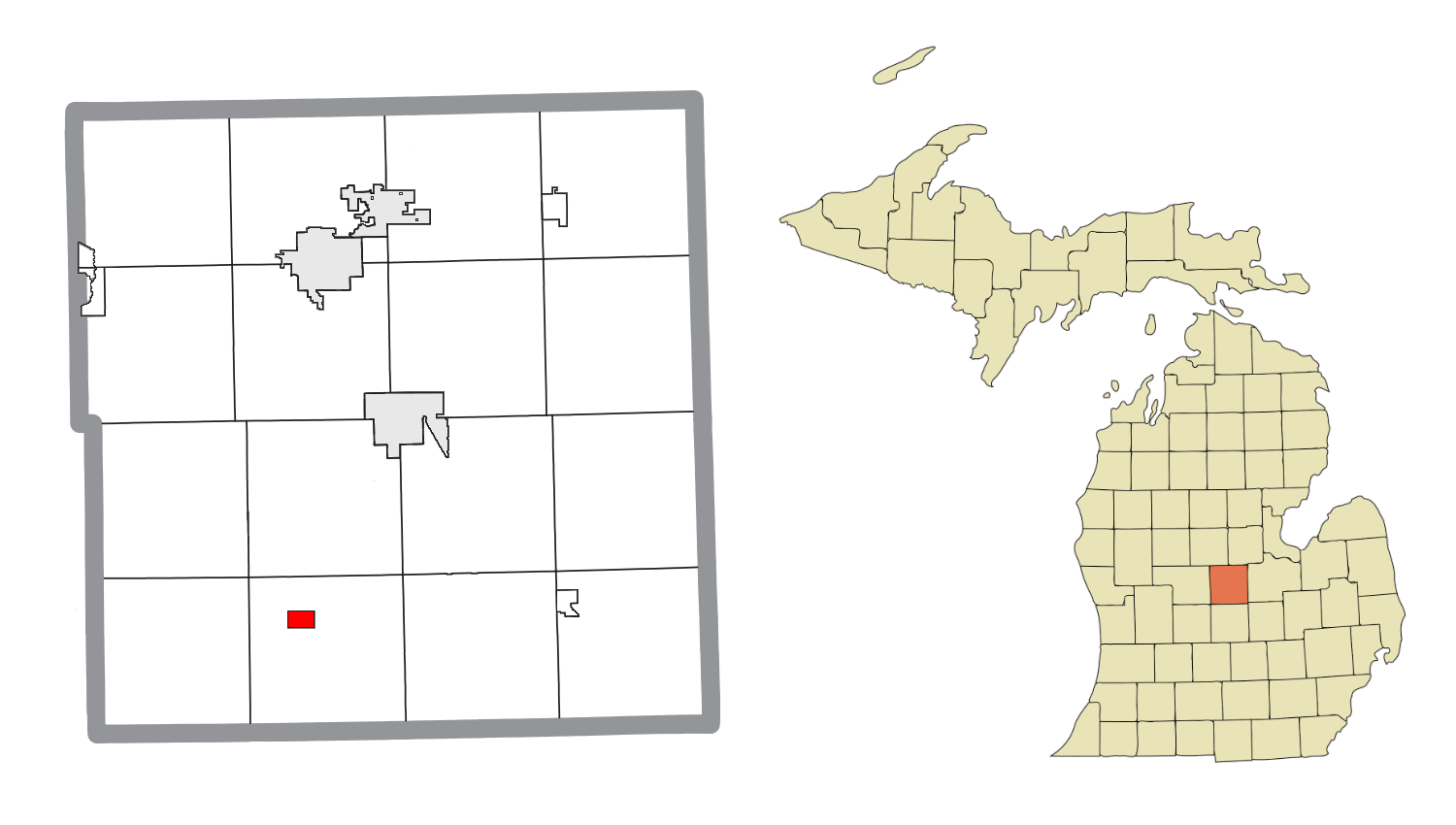
- Location within Gratiot County

- Location within the state of Michigan Location within the United States
- Coordinates: 43°10′54″N 84°40′52″W
- Country: United States
- State: Michigan
- County: Gratiot
- Township: Fulton
- Settled: 1886
- Incorporated: 1891

Government
  - Type: Village council
  - President: Janell Dunham
  - Pro tempore: Jason Blemaster

Area
  - Total: 0.64 sq mi (1.66 km^{2})
  - Land: 0.63 sq mi (1.64 km^{2})
  - Water: 0.0077 sq mi (0.02 km^{2})
- Elevation: 732 ft (223 m)

Population (2020)
  - Total: 393
  - Density: 621.4/sq mi (239.92/km^{2})
- Time zone: UTC-5 (Eastern (EST))
  - Summer (DST): UTC-4 (EDT)
- ZIP code(s): 48871
- Area code: 989
- FIPS code: 26-63660
- GNIS feature ID: 0634663
- Website: Official website

Perrinton (/pɛrˈrɪnˈtʌn/ PARE-rin-tuhn) is a village in Gratiot County in the U.S. state of Michigan. The population was 393 at the 2020 census. The village is located just north of M-57 within Fulton Township.

== Geography ==
According to the United States Census Bureau, the village has a total area of 0.64 square miles (1.66 km^{2}), of which 0.63 square miles (1.63 km^{2}) is land and 0.01 square miles (0.03 km^{2}) is water.

== Demographics ==
Historical population
Census	Pop.	Note	%±
1890	349		—
1900	330		−5.4%
1910	288		−12.7%
1920	419		45.5%
1930	373		−11.0%
1940	385		3.2%
1950	383		−0.5%
1960	424		10.7%
1970	489		15.3%
1980	448		−8.4%
1990	393		−12.3%
2000	439		11.7%
2010	406		−7.5%
2020	393		−3.2%
U.S. Decennial Census

=== 2010 census ===
As of the census of 2010, there were 406 people, 161 households, and 103 families living in the village. The population density was 644.4 inhabitants per square mile (248.8/km^{2}). There were 175 housing units at an average density of 277.8 per square mile (107.3/km^{2}). The racial makeup of the village was 95.6% White, 0.2% African American, 0.2% Asian, 2.5% from other races, and 1.5% from two or more races. Hispanic or Latino of any race were 3.2% of the population.

There were 161 households, of which 32.9% had children under the age of 18 living with them, 40.4% were married couples living together, 16.1% had a female householder with no husband present, 7.5% had a male householder with no wife present, and 36.0% were non-families. 28.0% of all households were made up of individuals, and 11.2% had someone living alone who was 65 years of age or older. The average household size was 2.52 and the average family size was 3.07.

The median age in the village was 38.4 years. 24.6% of residents were under the age of 18; 9.3% were between the ages of 18 and 24; 24.9% were from 25 to 44; 27.6% were from 45 to 64; and 13.8% were 65 years of age or older. The gender makeup of the village was 49.3% male and 50.7% female.

=== 2000 census ===
As of the census of 2000, there were 439 people, 166 households, and 114 families living in the village. The population density was 699.4 inhabitants per square mile (270.0/km^{2}). There were 173 housing units at an average density of 275.6 per square mile (106.4/km^{2}). The racial makeup of the village was 97.95% White, 0.46% from other races, and 1.59% from two or more races. Hispanic or Latino of any race were 0.68% of the population.

There were 166 households, out of which 31.3% had children under the age of 18 living with them, 52.4% were married couples living together, 12.0% had a female householder with no husband present, and 31.3% were non-families. 27.7% of all households were made up of individuals, and 15.1% had someone living alone who was 65 years of age or older. The average household size was 2.64 and the average family size was 3.20.

In the village, the population was spread out, with 27.8% under the age of 18, 10.0% from 18 to 24, 28.7% from 25 to 44, 21.6% from 45 to 64, and 11.8% who were 65 years of age or older. The median age was 35 years. For every 100 females, there were 89.2 males. For every 100 females age 18 and over, there were 88.7 males.

The median income for a household in the village was $34,500, and the median income for a family was $38,929. Males had a median income of $35,909 versus $18,125 for females. The per capita income for the village was $16,988. About 12.3% of families and 14.4% of the population were below the poverty line, including 18.7% of those under age 18 and 16.0% of those age 65 or over.

== Images ==
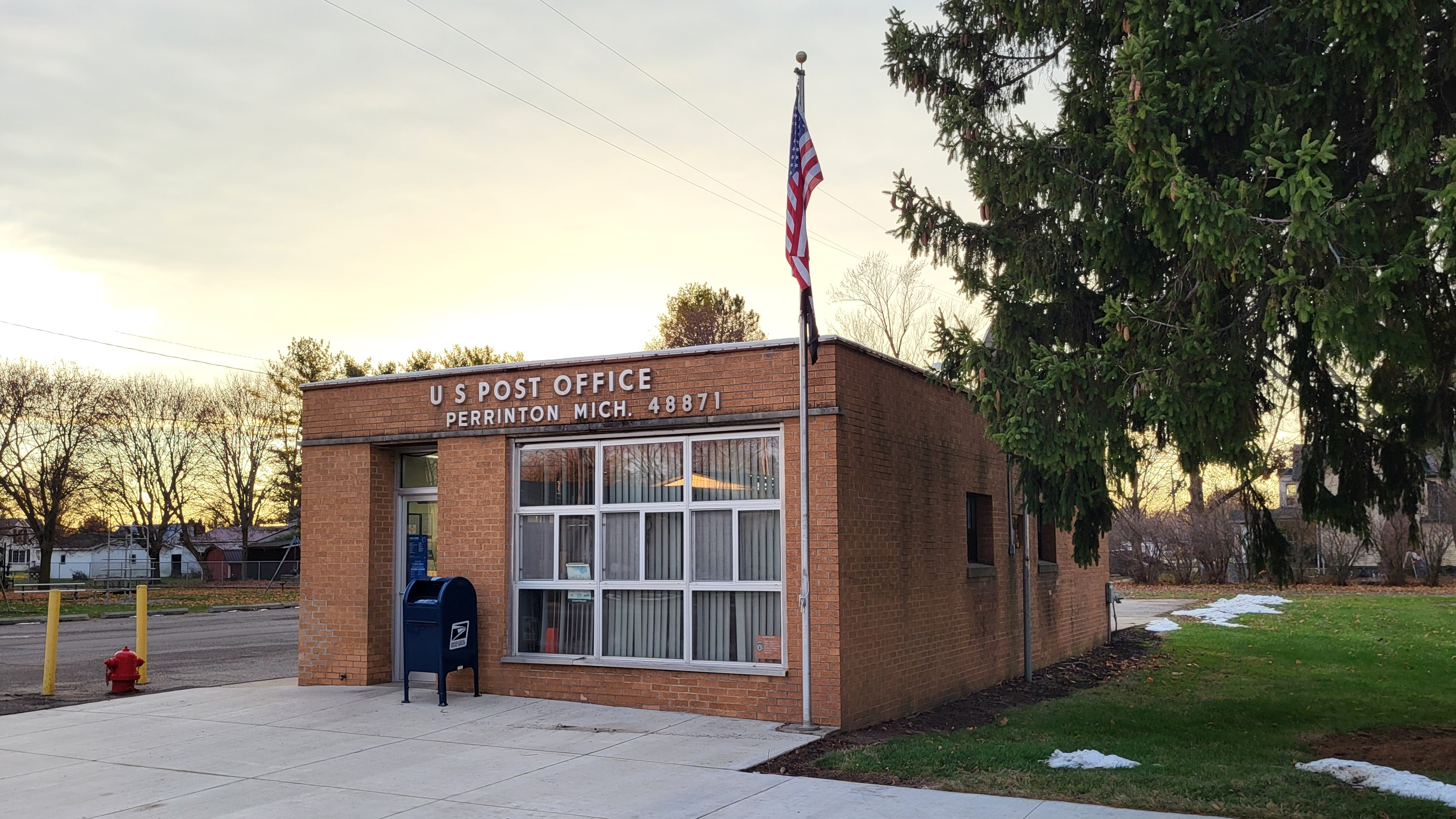
U.S. Post Office in Perrinton

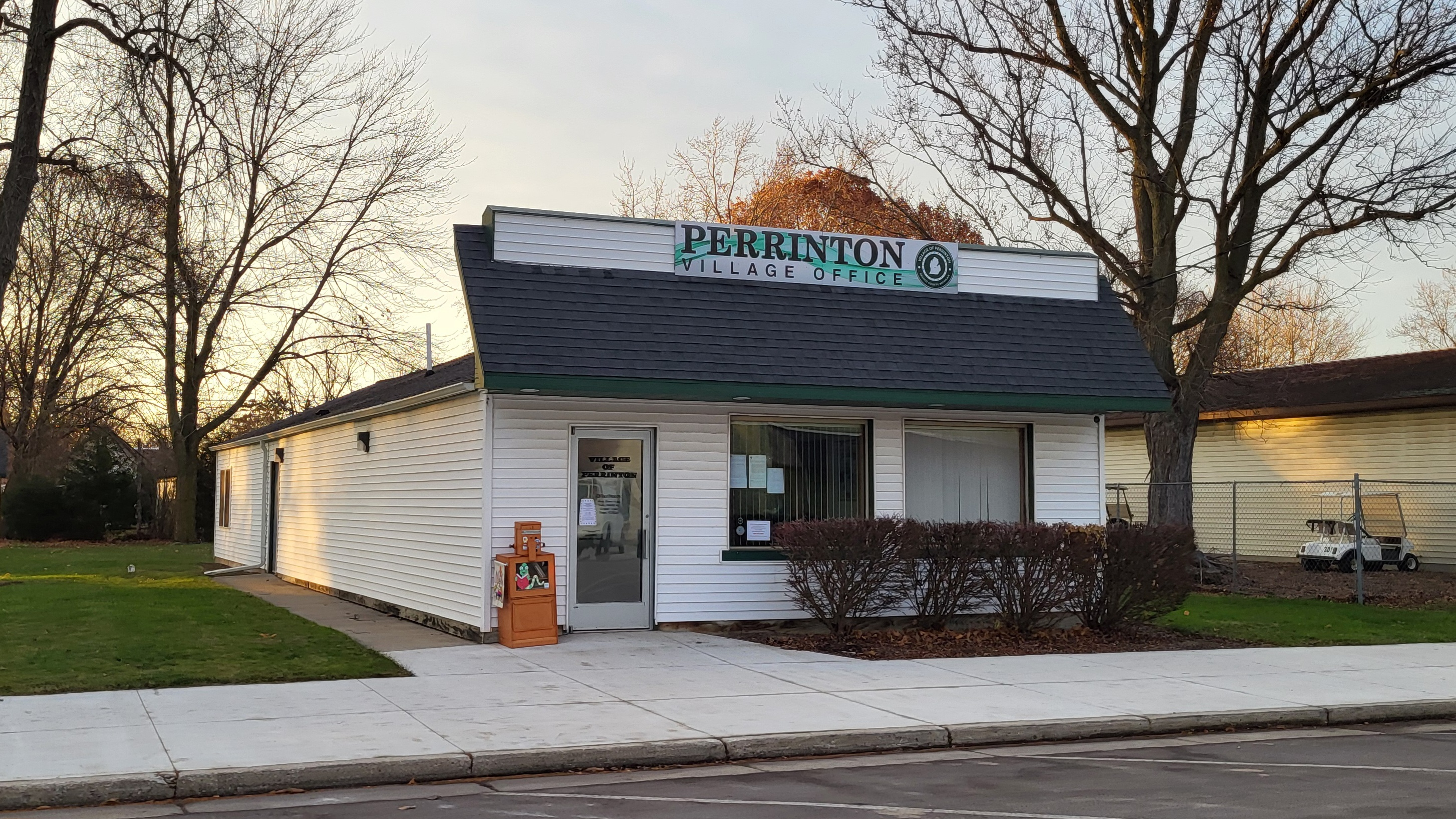
Perrinton village office
