= Bryant Kearl =

Professor of University of Wisconsin–Madison

Bryant Eastham Kearl (September 21, 1921 – September 28, 1993) was an American educator and acting Chancellor of the University of Wisconsin–Madison in 1968.

Born in Paris, Idaho, Kearl served in the United States Navy from 1944 to 1946. He received his bachelor's degree from Utah State University, his master's degree from the University of Wisconsin–Madison, and his doctorate degree from the University of Minnesota. In 1942, Kearl became a teaching assistant and then a professor of agricultural journalism at the University of Wisconsin. He was named vice chancellor at the University of Wisconsin in 1967 and then served as acting chancellor of the University of Wisconsin–Madison from July 1 until September 12, 1968. He retired in 1989 and died in Madison, Wisconsin in 1993.
