= Glenn Simpson Pound =

American academic (1914–2010)

Glenn Simpson Pound (March 7, 1914 – July 6, 2010) was an American educator and acting chancellor of the University of Wisconsin–Madison in 1977.

Born in Hector, Arkansas, Pound worked as a sharecropper in the Rio Grande Valley in Texas, where he worked his way up to running a 600-acre (240 ha) farm producing vegetables and cotton. He graduated from University of Arkansas in 1940, and then moved to Wisconsin that year, where he received his doctorate degree from University of Wisconsin in 1943. In 1946, Pound was named professor of plant pathology and was dean of the UW College of Agriculture from 1964 until 1979. In 1977, Pound was acting chancellor of the University of Wisconsin–Madison. Pound retired in 1979 and moved to La Jolla, California. He served as an adjunct professor of plant pathology at University of California, Riverside. He died in La Jolla, California in 2010.
