= Kathleen Bell Cooper =

Corporate economist and former governmental economist

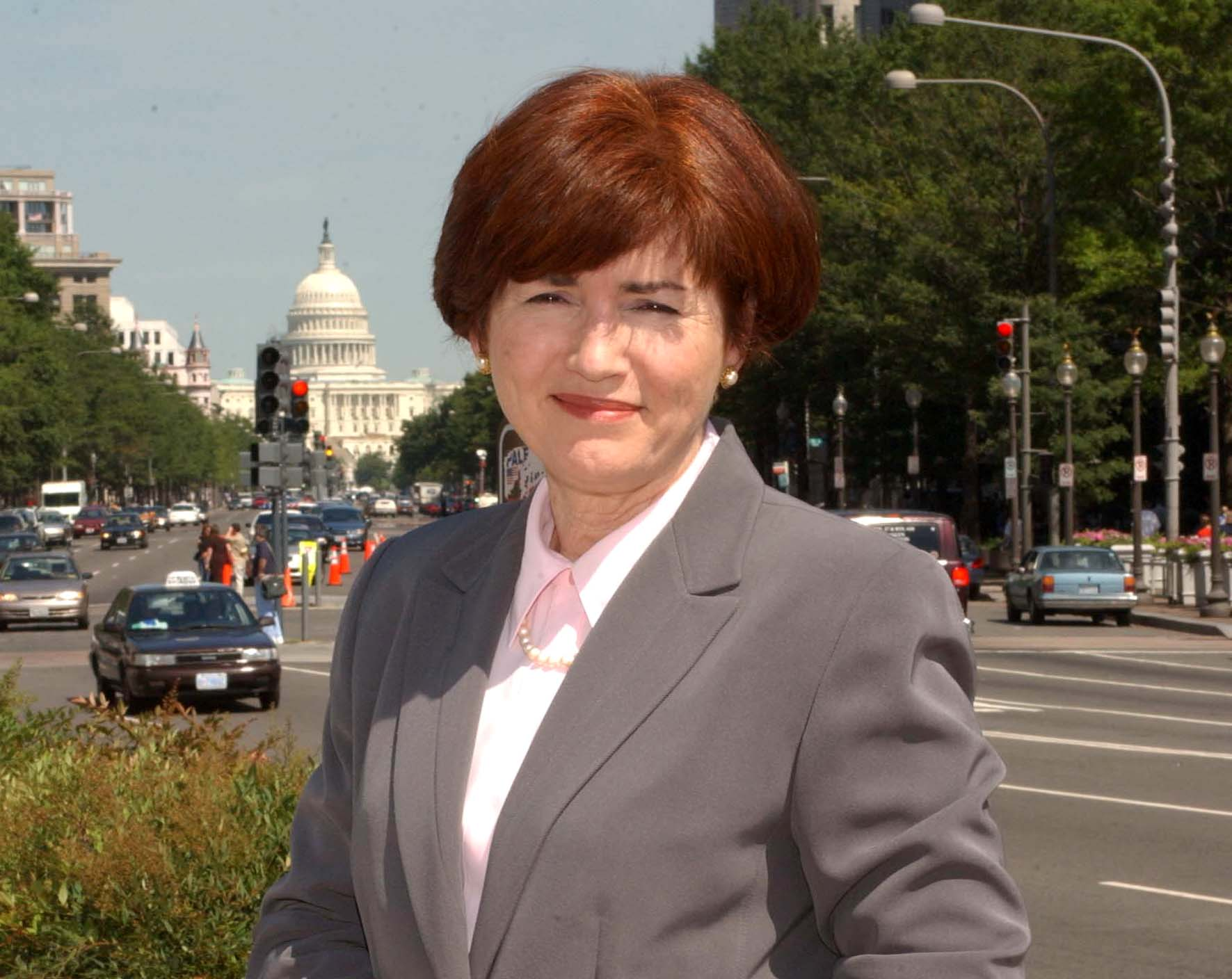
Cooper in 2002

Dr. Kathleen Marie Bell Cooper (born 3 February 1945, Dallas, Texas) is a corporate economist and former governmental economist who has worked for companies such as ExxonMobil and Security Pacific National Bank as well as being in leadership for such groups as the National Association of Business Economists. She is currently a director for the Williams Companies. She was the Under Secretary for Economic Affairs at the United States Department of Commerce during part of George W. Bush's presidency.

== Early life ==
Kathleen Bell was born to parents Ferne Elizabeth (McDougle) Bell and Patrick Joseph Bell in Dallas, Texas, in 1945. She married Ronald James Cooper at age 20. The couple had two sons, Michael and Christopher, in the late 70s and early 80s.

== Education ==
Cooper graduated in 1970 with a bachelor's degree in mathematics from the University of Texas at Arlington, and one year later with a master's degree.

After some time in industry, she returned for her PhD at the University of Colorado Boulder. She taught while continuing her corporate career.

Later in life, she became a trustee of Scripps College.

== Career ==
=== Banking ===
Cooper spent 9 years at the United Banks of Colorado after her master's degree, and was promoted to chief economist. She moved on to led the Economic Department at Security Pacific National Bank in 1981.

=== Energy ===
She became chief economist for Exxon in 1990, then expanded her role when Exxon merged with Mobil Oil and led the Economics and Energy Division.

After her governmental stint, Cooper became a director, including chair of the board, for the Williams Companies. She continued that role into 2020.

=== Government ===
In 2001, Cooper was confirmed as the Under Secretary for Economic Affairs at the United States Department of Commerce. This was her first and only political appointment and governmental role. She held the role until 2005.

=== Academic ===
Cooper's first professional role was as a research assistant at the University of Texas at Arlington.

Cooper was a part-time lecturer during her time at United Banks around 1980.

She became dean of the College of Business Administration at the University of North Texas in 2006.

== Professional memberships ==
Cooper has been a part of:

- National Association of Business Economics (president, 1985-86)
- U.S. Association of Energy Economics (president, 1996)
- International Women's Forum (treasurer, 1999-2001)
- Committee for Economic Development
- American Council on Capital Formation
- Conference of Business Economists
