= Wisconsin model =

The Wisconsin model of socio-economic attainment is a model that describes and explains an individual's social mobility and its economic, social, and psychological determinants. The logistics of this model are primarily attributed to William H. Sewell and colleagues including Archibald Haller, Alejandro Portes and Robert M. Hauser. The model receives its name from the state in which a significant amount of the research and analysis was completed. Unlike the previous research on this topic by Peter Blau and Otis Dudley Duncan, this model encompasses more than just educational and occupational factors and their effect on social mobility for American males. The Wisconsin model has been described as "pervasive in its influence on the style and content of research in several subfields of sociology."

== Prior research ==
Before the framework for the Wisconsin model was constructed, Peter Blau and Otis Duncan established the first model of social mobility of its kind. However, the Blau-Duncan model was made up of only five predictors. These included father's education and occupation, the individual's education and first job, and the individual's job several years later (THE AMERICAN OCCUPATIONAL STRUCTURE).

== Purpose ==
Sewell and his counterparts aimed to contribute to the Blau-Duncan model of status attainment by adding predictor variables. Because the results given by the Blau-Duncan model were based heavily on "structural factors as explanatory variables", the Wisconsin model was created to account for "social-psychological factors on educational and occupational attainment", which, provided a more accurate prediction. These variables came from analyses done by Sewell and Haller in the 1950s and published (with Sewell's agreement) by Haller and Miller (1963, 1971). The latter work includes the theory on which the psychosociological variables of the WM are based.

== Model variables ==
The model consisted of eight characteristics that most effectively linked socio-economic background to status attainment. Occupational attainment, educational attainment, level of occupational aspiration, level of educational aspiration, the influence of significant others, academic performance, socioeconomic status, and mental ability are the 8 predictors of socio-economic attainment.

=== Occupational attainment ===
Occupational attainment measures were done by Otis Dudley Duncan's socio-economic index of occupational status.

=== Educational attainment ===
Educational achievement is achieved by assigning a point value to certain levels of education that a subject has reached. Earlier studies only classified subjects into those who went to college and those who did not. In more recent studies using this model, educational attainment is now classified into four levels: no post high school education, vocational school, college attendance, and a college degree.

=== Level of occupational aspiration ===
To quantify the level of occupational aspiration, the subject's level is calculated by again categorizing Duncan's socioeconomic index scores in association with the occupation that the subject has hope to hold in the future.

=== Level of educational aspiration ===
Level of educational aspiration is classified by the education level that each subject originally indicates that they hope to secure. Once again, some recent studies have assigned point values for three levels of desired education level: not continuing education after high school, vocational school, or college. Previous studies only categorized students based on which type of institution they planned on attending prior to high school graduation.

=== Significant others' influence ===
The variable of significant others' influence can be determined by evaluating two important perceptions of the subject: parental and teacher encouragement to attend college and friend's college plans. Additional work regarding the influence of significant others on occupational aspirations was subsequently done by Haller and is students Joseph Woelfel and Ed L. Fink.

Based on the original Sewell, Haller, and Portes article, Sewell first reports that the broad outlines of the Wisconsin model relied on data from a statewide survey of all Wisconsin high school seniors that included information about whether students perceived their parents, teachers, and friends as expecting them to go to college. Later work initiated and implemented by Archie O. Haller, Joseph Woelfel and Edward L. Fink surveyed adolescent students and identified the specific people who communicated most with them about education and occupation. They also served as examples for their own educational and occupational futures. The "Significant Other Project" produced survey instruments which also identified the specific significant others for educational and occupational aspirations and measured their educational and occupational aspirations for the students

=== Academic performance ===
The Academic Performance value is calculated by the subject's high school class rank.

=== Socioeconomic status ===
Originally, socio-economic status was determined by a weighted combination of parents education, father's occupation, and average annual income from 1957 to 1960.

=== Mental ability ===
The variable of mental ability is determined by the analysis of standardized testing. In previous studies, statewide test results for high school juniors and seniors are compared with state intelligence norms.

== Effects of social psychology and stratification research on the process of status attainment ==
=== Interpersonal influence ===
Primarily, the significant others' direct influence on the subject specifically relates to one's educational and occupational aspirations and also educational attainment. Basically, this implies that those who are constantly involved with a subject (mother, father, friend) will have a direct outcome on what type of education the subject receives.

=== Self-reflexive action ===
Essentially, this implies that a person's status attainment can only be limited by one's own "perceived ability". Structural factors, however, determine the expectations of an individual's significant others—which then influence the person's attitudes. These attitudes themselves then exert directive forces over both academic performance and later educational and occupational attainments.

=== Status aspirations ===
One's desire to attain status (statis aspiration) is an obligation for educational and occupational attainment.

== Resulting hypotheses ==
Because this model organizes how status aspirations are formed and the way in which they influence "attainment-oriented behavior" the following conclusions can be drawn from the model:

"Status aspirations are complex forms of attitudes whose translation into attainment levels is affected by the context in which individuals attempt to enact them."

"Attitudes - including levels of aspiration - are formed and altered through two basic mechanisms; interpersonal influence, including reflexive adjustment of others' expectations, including self-reflection."

== See also ==
- Status attainment
- Social mobility
- Social stratification
