= Joseph Woelfel =

American sociologist

Joseph Woelfel (born June 3, 1940) is an American sociologist. Born in Buffalo, New York, Dr. Woelfel is an Emeritus Professor in the Department of Communication at the University at Buffalo, The State University of New York.

== Career ==
Woelfel obtained his BA in Sociology from Canisius College in 1962, and an MA in Sociology from the University of Wisconsin–Madison in 1963. He obtained his Ph.D. in Sociology, also from the University of Wisconsin, in 1968. Throughout his studies he minored in philosophy. After acting as an instructor at Canisius College (1965–1966) and as a research associate at University of Wisconsin during his studies, Woelfel began work as an assistant professor at the University of Illinois at Urbana–Champaign in 1968. In 1972 he moved to Michigan State University as an associate professor. Then in 1978 he moved to University at Albany, SUNY as a visiting professor, where he was then hired as an associate professor in 1979. In 1981 he was promoted to professor and in 1982 acted as chair of the Department of Communication. In 1988 he was director of research and founding fellow of the Institute for the Study of Information Science. Finally, he moved to University at Buffalo as professor and chair (1989–1995) of the Department of Communication and has remained as professor (since 1995).

Woelfel was also senior fellow at the East-West Center in Honolulu (1977–1983), a Fulbright scholar in the former Yugoslavia, and Senior fellow at the Rockefeller Institute of Government at the State University of New York. He received the Alise-Bohdan Wynar Research Paper Award from the Association for Library and Information Science Education in December 2001 and the Jesse M. Shera Award for Distinguished Published Research in 2003.

In 2011 he and co-editor in chief Ed Fink launched the RAH Press online journal Communication and Science, in 2013 he published The Culture of Science: Is Social Science Science? and in 2018 he published Galileo and its applications: Tools for the study of cognitive and cultural processes.

== Ideas ==
Woelfel's early work focused on attitude formation and change. At the University of Wisconsin he worked with Archie O. Haller and Edward L. Fink on the "Significant Other Project," a project originated by Haller as part of the larger "Wisconsin model" of status attainment. The Wisconsin Model is differentiated from other models of status attainment (e.g. those of Peter Blau and Otis Dudley Duncan, Nan Lin, and Mark Granovetter), by its focus on intervening social psychological and communication variables. Rather than assuming that individuals all seek high status and are helped or impeded in their quest by access to resources (social capital), the Wisconsin model suggests that different individuals aspire to different levels of educational and occupational attainment, and that these aspirations themselves are formed by a communication process whereby "significant others" communicate their expectations for the individual to him or her in various ways.

Although the role of significant others' expectations in influencing the attitudes of individuals had been long theorized, the Wisconsin Significant Other project was the first research to identify the specific significant others for a set of individuals, measure their expectations directly, and calculate the effect of those expectations on the aspirations of the individuals. In the process, the project developed the Wisconsin Significant Other Battery (WISOB) to identify specific significant others for any individual and to measure their educational and occupational expectations for him or her.

This research later developed into a more general theory of attitude formation called Galileo theory. Woelfel was instrumental in developing computer software such as CATPAC, a neural network that analyzes text, and the Galileo suite of programs used to measure beliefs and attitudes. The Rand Corporation surveyed numerous social science approaches for measuring attitudes and indicated in a 2009 report that "One of the more interesting approaches to communication and attitude change we found was Joseph Woelfel’s metric multidimensional scaling approach, which is called Galileo. In many ways, Woelfel’s theory was the closest that any social science approach came to providing the basis for an end-to-end engineering solution for planning, conducting, and assessing the impact of communications on attitudes and behaviors."

Tracing scientific thought via two ancient Greek networks (Athenian and Ionian), Woelfel's 2013 book further considers how concepts are formed first by the collective and then communicated to individual minds through interaction among individuals. In this book he argues the lack of progress exhibited in the social sciences is due to inadequacy of the underlying Athenian philosophy that continues to pervade the social sciences; he then shows how human processes can successfully be studied using the same methods used to study physical phenomena.

== Bibliography ==
Books:

Woelfel, J. (2018). Galileo and its Applications: Tools for the Study of Cognitive and Cultural Processes. Buffalo, NY: RAH Press. ISBN 978-1-530687985

Woelfel, J. (2013). The Culture of Social Science: Is Social Science Science? Buffalo, NY: RAH Press. ISBN 978-0-9892693-0-8

Woelfel, J. (1992). Communication and Science. New York: McGraw-Hill.

Woelfel, J. & Fink, E. L. (1980). The Measurement of Communication Processes: Galileo Theory and Method. New York: Academic Press. ISBN 0-12-761240-8

Articles and book chapters:

Woelfel, J. (1972). "Significant others and their role relationships to students in a high school population." Rural Sociology, 37(1), 86–97.

Woelfel, J. (1975). "Theoretical issues and alternatives: A theory of occupational choice." In J. S. Picou, & R. E. Campbell (Ed.s), Career behavior of special groups (pp. 41–61). Columbus, Ohio: Merrill.

Woelfel, J. (1987). "Development of the western model: Toward a reconciliation of eastern and western perspectives." In D. L. Kincaid (Ed.), Communication theory: Eastern and western perspectives (pp. 299–314). San Diego: Academic Press.

Woelfel, J. (1988). "The Galileo System: A theory and method for analyzing cognitive processes." In J. C. Mancuso and M. L. G. Shaw (Eds.), Cognition and personal structure. New York: Praeger.

Woelfel, J. (1993). "Artificial neural networks in policy research: A current assessment." Journal of Communication, 43(1), 63–80.

Woelfel, J. (1997). "Attitudes as nonhierarchical clusters in neural networks." In G. A. Barnett & F. Boster (Eds.), Progress in communication sciences 13 (pp. 213–227). Norwood, NJ: Ablex Publishing.

Woelfel, J. (1997). "Social science applications of nonequilibrium thermodynamics: Science or poetry? Procedures for the precise measurement of energy in social systems." In G. A. Barnett and L. Thayer (Ed.s), Organization ↔Communication. Emerging perspectives V. The renaissance in systems thinking. Greenwish, CT: Ablex Publishing Corp

Woelfel, J., & Barnett, G. A. (1982). "Multidimensional scaling in Riemann space." Quality and Quantity, 16, 469–491.

Woelfel, J., & Barnett, G. A. (1992). "Procedures for controlling reference frame effects in the measurement of multidimensional processes." Quality and Quantity, 26, 367–381.

Woelfel, J., Barnett, G. A., Pruzek, R., Zimmelman, R. (1989). "Rotation to simple processes: The effect of alternative rotation rules on observed patterns in time-ordered measurements." Quality & Quantity, 23, 3–20.

Woelfel, J., Cody, M. J., Gillham, J., & Holmes, R. A. (1980). "Basic premises of multidimensional attitude change theory: An experimental analysis." Human Communication Research 6(2), 153–167.

Woelfel, J., & Danes, J. E. (1980). "Multidimensional scaling model for communication research." In P. Monge & J. N. Capella (Eds.), Multivariate Techniques in Human Communication Research (pp. 333–364). New York: Academic Press.

Woelfel, J., Fink, E. L., Cai, D. A., Anderson, K., Iacobucci, A., & Wang, H. (2023). "Inertia in cognitive processes: the case of the COVID-19 vaccine." Qual Quant. https://doi.org/10.1007/s11135-023-01684-x

Woelfel, J., & Haller, A. (1971). "Significant others: The self-reflexive act and the attitude formation process." American Sociological Review, 36(1), 74–87.

Woelfel, J., Holmes, R. A., Cody, M. J., & Fink, E. L. (1988). "A multi-dimensional scaling based procedure for designing persuasive messages and measuring their effects." In G. A. Barnett & J. Woelfel (Eds.), Readings in the Galileo System: Theory, Methods, and Applications (pp. 313–332). Dubuque, IA: Kendall-Hunt.

Woelfel, J., & Kincaid, D. L. (1987). "Dialogue on the nature of causality, measurement, and human communication theory." In D. L. Kincaid (Ed.), Communication Theory: Eastern and Western Perspectives (pp. 275–294). San Diego: Academic Press.

Woelfel, J., & Murero, M. (2005). "Spaces and networks: Concepts for social stratification." Research in Social Stratification and Mobility, 22, 51–71.

Woelfel, J., & Napoli, N. (1984). "Measuring human emotion: Proposed standards." In W. B. Gudykunst & Y. Y. Kim (Eds.) Methods for Intercultural Communication Research (pp. 117–127). Beverly Hills, CA: Sage Publications.

Woelfel, J., Newton, B., Holmes, R., Kincaid, D. L., & Lee, J.-Y. (1986). "Effects of compound messages on global characteristics of Galileo spaces." Quality and Quantity, 20, 133–145.

Woelfel, J., Richards, W., & Stoyanoff, N. J. (1993). "Conversational networks." In W. Richards and G. A. Barnett (Eds.) Progress in Communication Sciences 12 (pp. 223–245). Norwood, N.J.: Ablex Publishing.

Woelfel, J., & Saltiel, J. (1978). "Cognitive processes as motions in a multi-dimensional space: A general linear model." In F. Casmir (Ed.), Intercultural and International Communication (pp. 105–130). Washington, D.C.: University Press of America.

Woelfel, J., & Stoyanoff, N. J. (2007). "The Galileo System: A rational alternative to the dominant paradigm for social science research." In M. Hinner (Ed.), Freiberger beiträge zur interkulturellen und wirtschaftskommunikation: A forum for general and Intercultural business communication. Vol. 3. The role of communication in business transactions and relationships (pp. 433–462). Berlin: Peter Lang.
