= Robert M. Hauser =

American sociologist

Robert Mason Hauser
- Born: 1942 (age 83–84); Chicago, Illinois, U.S.
- Occupation: Quantitative sociology
- Known for: Social stratification, social statistics, and aging
- Spouse: Taissa S. Hauser
- Parent(s): Sylvia and Julius Hauser
- Relatives: Philip M. Hauser

Academic background
- Education: University of Chicago (BA); University of Michigan (MA, PhD)
- Thesis: Family, School, and Neighborhood Factors in Educational Performances in a Metropolitan School System
- Doctoral advisor: Otis Dudley Duncan

Robert Mason Hauser is an American sociologist. He is the Vilas Research and Samuel F. Stouffer professor of sociology emeritus at the University of Wisconsin–Madison, where he served as director of the Institute for Research on Poverty and the Center for Demography of Health and Aging.

Hauser is known for his work in quantitative sociology, studying issues such as social stratification, social mobility, impacts of education, race and gender, persistence of inequality across generations, and aging. Hauser served as executive director of the Division of Behavioral and Social Sciences and Education at the National Academies of Sciences, Engineering, and Medicine (2010–2016) and now serves as executive officer of the American Philosophical Society (2017-).

== Early life and education ==
Robert Mason Hauser was born to Sylvia and Julius Hauser in Chicago, Illinois. His father was an organic chemist with the Food and Drug Administration (FDA). His uncle, Philip M. Hauser, was a sociologist, demographer, and social statistician. The family moved from Chicago to the Anacostia neighborhood of Washington, DC, in 1949 and to Silver Spring, Maryland in 1954.

Hauser has a B.A. in economics (1963) from the University of Chicago and an M.A. (1966) and Ph.D. (1968) in sociology from the University of Michigan. His dissertation was Family, School, and Neighborhood Factors in Educational Performances in a Metropolitan School System, supervised by Otis Dudley Duncan. It was selected by the American Sociological Association for publication in the Arnold and Caroline Rose Monograph series, appearing as Socioeconomic background and educational performance (1971).

== Career ==
From 1967 to 1969 Hauser was on the faculty of the department of sociology and anthropology at Brown University. In 1969 Hauser joined the department of sociology at the University of Wisconsin–Madison. Robert Hauser became the Vilas Research and Samuel F. Stouffer professor of sociology (now retired) at the University of Wisconsin–Madison, and served as director of the university's Institute for Research on Poverty and the Center for Demography of Health and Aging.

He worked with William H. Sewell and others to develop the Wisconsin model of status attainment, described as "paradigmatic in its influence on an entire subfield of the discipline." Hauser joined the project in 1969 and led the Wisconsin Longitudinal Study (WLS) from 1980 to 2010, working closely with his wife, research scientist Taissa S. Hauser

Hauser has also served on several committees of the United States National Research Council. He was the executive director of the Division of Behavioral and Social Sciences and Education at the National Academies of Sciences, Engineering, and Medicine from 2010 to 2016. He became executive officer of the American Philosophical Society as of June 12, 2017.

== Research ==
Hauser has developed and used statistical methodology and data analysis techniques for the study of educational effects. Hauser's research examines trends in educational progression and social mobility in the US due to race, ethnicity and gender. He has studied the effects of families on social and economic inequality, and changes in socioeconomic standing, health, and well-being across the life course through the Wisconsin Longitudinal Study. He examines and critiques the use of educational assessment as a policy tool.

== Awards and honors ==
- 2008, Fellow, American Educational Research Association
- 2005, Member, American Philosophical Society
- 2003, Award for Distinguished Contributions to the Teaching of Sociology, American Sociological Association
- 1998, Fellow, National Academy of Education
- 1986, Inaugural Paul F. Lazarsfeld award in research methods, American Sociological Association
- 1984. Fellow, United States National Academy of Sciences
- 1984, Elected, American Academy of Arts & Sciences
- 1977, American Association for the Advancement of Science
- Fellow, Gerontological Society of America
- Member, American Statistical Association

== Selected bibliography ==
- Hauser, Robert Mason (1971). Socioeconomic background and educational performance (The Arnold M. and Caroline Rose Monograph Series in Sociology) (PDF). Washington: American Sociological Association.
- Sewell, William H.; Hauser, Robert M. (1975). Education, occupation, and earnings : achievement in the early career. New York: Academic Press. ISBN 978-0126378504.
- Sewell, William H.; Hauser, Robert M.; Featherman, David L., eds. (1976). Schooling and achievement in American society. New York: Academic Press. ISBN 0126378606.
- Hauser, Robert Mason; Featherman, David L. (1977). The process of stratification : trends and analyses. New York: Academic Press. ISBN 0123330505.
- Featherman, David L.; Hauser, Robert H. (1978). Opportunity and change. New York: Academic Press. ISBN 0122503503.
- Heubert, Jay P.; Hauser, Robert M., eds. (1999). High stakes : testing for tracking, promotion, and graduation. Washington, D.C.: National Academy Press. ISBN 0-309-06280-2.
- National Research Council (US) Panel on Collecting, Storing, Accessing, and Protecting Biological Specimens and Biodata in Social Surveys (2010). "Biographical Sketches of Panel Members and Staff". In Hauser, Robert M.; Weinstein, Maxine; Pool, Robert; Cohen, Barney (eds.). Conducting Biosocial Surveys: Collecting, Storing, Accessing, and Protecting Biospecimens and Biodata. Washington (DC): National Academies Press (US).
