= Mayerfeld =

Mayerfeld is a surname. Notable people with the surname include:

- Michael Mayerfeld Bell (born 1957), American sociologist, author, and musician
- Uri Mayerfeld, Canadian rabbi
