= Taissa (given name) =

Taissa is a feminine given name. Notable people with the name include:

- Taissa Farmiga (born 1994), American actress
- Taissa S. Hauser (1942−2014), American sociologist

Fictional character:

- Taissa Turner, of the TV show Yellowjackets
