= Catpac =

Text analysis software

Catpac is a computer program that analyzes text samples to identify key concepts contained within the sample. It was conceived chiefly by Richard Holmes, a Michigan State computer programmer and Dr. Joseph Woelfel, a University at Albany and University at Buffalo sociologist for the analysis of attitude formation and change in the sociological context. Contributions by Rob Zimmelman, an undergraduate and graduate student at the University of Albany, from 1981 to 1984 on the Univac 1100 mainframe, included the inclusion of the CATPAC software in the Galileo*Telegal system, text-labeling and porting of CATPAC output for the Galileo system of paired-comparison conceptual visualization. CATPAC and the Galileo system are still in commercial use today, and with recent data capture and visualization contributions, continues to grow. Contributions by other students at the university resulted in the software that is still in commercial use today. It uses text files as input and produces output such as word and alphabetical frequencies as well as various types of cluster analysis.

== Design ==
Catpac is a self-organizing, i.e. unsupervised, interactive activation and competition (IAC) artificial neural network used for text analysis. The program generates a multidimensional scalar output organizing words throughout the text by creating a weighted word-by-word matrix that establishes the eigenvector centralities of concepts. The word-by-word matrix represents the relationship between one word and the occurrence of another. Catpac identifies important words and patterns based on the organization of the text. This process mimics the connections between neurons in a human brain, strengthening connections through conditioning to generate a pattern of similarities among all words within a body of text.

== Use ==
Catpac has been used in commercial studies, in academic scholarship to investigate massive textual data sets, as a strong semantic network analysis tool, for longitudinal analyses, for multilingual analyses, as a predictor of media usage and as a powerful content analysis tool.

== Availability ==
Catpac, conceived as an improvement to simple word-count software more than 30 years ago, is currently available in windows 32 bit format.
