= Status attainment =

Process by which individuals achieve their positions within society

In sociology, status attainment refers to the process through which individuals achieve their positions within society, including their social class. This process is influenced by both achieved factors, such as educational attainment and career accomplishments, and ascribed factors, such as family income and social background. Status attainment theories emphasize the possibility of social mobility, whether upward or downward, within a class-based system. Achieved factors highlight personal efforts and choices, while ascribed factors reflect the impact of circumstances individuals are born into. Together, these dynamics shape an individual's opportunities and outcomes in social stratification systems.

Research has explained the role of institutional inequality, educational access, and social support systems in shaping status attainment outcomes. It suggests that different access people may have towards educational resources and opportunities can affect their social mobility and attainment (Taylor & Francis, 2024).

== History ==
Peter M. Blau (1918–2002) and Otis Duncan (1921–2004) were the first sociologists to isolate the concept of status attainment. Their initial thesis stated that the lower the level from which a person starts, the greater is the probability that he will be upwardly mobile, simply because many more occupational destinations entail upward mobility for men with low origins than for those with high ones. After continued research, the initial statement proved to be incorrect. Blau and Duncan realized that people couldn't possibly think that the best way to get a high-social status position is to start at the bottom. They continued to find that the flaw was in the question the information was based upon. They found their research shouldn't be founded upon the question of "How are people mobile" but on "how do people attain their statuses". Peter Blau and Otis Duncan continued to conduct a landmark research study called The American Occupational Structure to provide answers to their new question. The American Occupational Structure, demonstrated the significant relationship between parental status, education, and occupational attainment.

There are two similar working models in regards to status attainment theory. As Haller & Portes (1973) noted there is the Blau and Duncan's (1967) model which focuses on status transmission, that there is some direct effect of parental influence. However, ultimately the level of education affects occupational attainment. Also, the Wisconsin model comes to similar conclusion however notes that the effects of parental status vanish when other factors are considered. (Haller & Portes, 1973).

Sociologists usually group education, income, and the occupation as the main groups of socioeconomic status. This can be related within, and across generations. Individuals that are of higher status attainment, will often have children later in life, which will usually, in turn, create the space for smaller families. This can then help the children to reach for higher levels of education, and achieve higher status attainment themselves.

== Social Capital and Status Attainment ==
Social capital refers to the resources and opportunities people acquire through their relationships, networks, and connections. Researchers argue that family support, mentorship, and access to higher networks can influence educational and occupational status attainment. People from higher backgrounds are more open to access better support than people with lower socioeconomic backgrounds. This contributes to unequal social mobility outcomes (Cal Poly, Kerbo).

== In the United States ==
The occupation of household heads, their level of education, and household income are highly correlated with status attainment and capital. A strong indicator that points to the variation of status attainment is measured through various standardized achievement tests, that reflect academic aptitude. Therefore, the ascribed ability and relation to the constellation of household, strongly affects educational attainment. Academic performance and aptitude carries an influence on status attainment since the highest level of education attained, is a strong predictor of an individual's future occupational positions and the type of work they qualify for.

Studies have demonstrated that unequal funding in schools, neighborhood resources, and access to higher education continue to shape status attainment in the United States. Inequality in education can affect disadvantages groups' opportunities (Taylor & Francis, 2024).

Encouragement from family and friends will affect education and occupational attainment. These aspirations create an expectation of achieving a certain educational level or occupation. Educational attainment strongly influences occupational attainment. It is clear that all of these factors are linked together and continue to affect each other throughout one's lifespan.

Status attainment in the U.S. is the process of acquiring positions in educational and occupational hierarchies. Major influential factors include: parental social background, cognitive ability, motivation and education. Very trivial, but nonetheless imperative to one's starting status, family background and upbringing play a major role in status attainment. For example, being born into a wealthy family gives an individual a better starting point than an individual being born into poverty.

Cognitive ability or one's intellect can contribute to the probability of one seeking higher education in life. An individual's level of educational attainment provides a better chance for moving up the occupational ladder. Cognitive ability is linked to motivation and education which are the other two major influential contributors of status attainment. This aspect of status attainment has nothing to do with one's parental social background, but rather acts on its own as an attribute for achieving higher status attainment. Being a factor independent from family background or motivation and education, cognitive ability cannot be enhanced or a predicate of the likelihood of one achieving a higher status. Someone of great intellect could have no motivation to accomplish anything, and someone of lesser intellect could be motivated and do great things.

Perhaps the most influential factor in determining one's status attainment is motivation and education. "This plays an important role in status attainment research and has been found to influence both educational attainment and occupational aspirations of young people, as well as the timing of life course transitions" (Schoon, 72). The higher the motivation a person has the more likely they are to receive higher education and eventually gain a higher paying occupation.

African Americans follow the same path, but their steps are limited. Differences in educational and occupational attainment have declined among African Americans. However, on average, African Americans and Whites begin at different status levels and end in different status levels. Increased schooling benefits everyone, but due to discrimination, white males benefit more. The same results occur in other minority groups and among females.

As Kerckhoff (1976) notes, African Americans' educational attainments and occupational attainments are lower than those of white people.

== Socialization vs. allocation ==
Socialization and Allocation are two different types of status attainment. Both models discuss the importance of how others effect attainments of an individual. "While both are the same in that aspect both differentiate on theoretical interpretations of the same observations and direct our attention to different kinds of phenomena." (Kerckhoff 368-379).

=== Allocation ===
According to Rodney Stark, allocation theories argue the primary function of schools is to allocate status, to place students in the stratification system, rather than to train them. (Stark 641). "In other words teachers identify and classify students according to externally imposed criteria." (Kerckhoff 368-379). "Since this seems to imply that social order rests upon consensual values, and that the prestige hierarchy is a function of widespread convergence in moral evaluations, the approach has been criticized as an extension of the functional theory of stratification—although its practitioners strenuously deny this charge." (Marshall 1998). In this model "social agencies" try to determine the path of the individual and the individual is constricted to what they can do. Allocation is "based on "plans" and "exceptions" rather than "wishes" or "aspirations". As children get older they become less convinced that everyone has an equal chance to obtain "good things" in life." (Kerckhoff 368-379). The clearest examples of this model are discrimination of race and individual characteristics. In the article "The Status Attainment Process: Socialization or Allocation?" Alan C. Kerckhoff states "rewards black receive for any level of accomplishment are lower than those of whites at the same level".

=== Socialization ===
Socialization, on the other hand, looks for the characteristics that affect the individual. This term is used by many but most commonly used by psychologist, sociologists and educationalists to describe the learning of ones culture and how to fit in. Also it teaches one how to act and participate in the society. Referring to the book Sociology, Socialization is the process by which culture is learned and internalized by each member of society-much of which occurs during childhood. (Stark 657). Or it can be explained as "the process by which we learn to become members of society, both by internalizing the norms and values of society, and also by learning to perform our social roles." (Marshall 1998). Unlike allocation adults can be enabled to perform new roles. With this model motivation and ability are important factors to help one attain status, this means "Individuals are free to move within the social system, attainments being determined by what the individual does and how well they choose to do it." (Kerckhoff).

== Gender ==
Gender dynamics have evolved significantly over recent decades, with notable shifts in the pathways to status attainment for women. As labor force participation for women has increased globally, the influence of individual achievements, such as education and occupational status, on status attainment has grown. Historically, family background and marriage played a more central role in shaping women's socioeconomic outcomes. However, modernization processes have enabled a greater emphasis on personal attributes, such as education and work experience, in determining occupational and social mobility.

Despite these advancements, disparities remain. Women from lower socioeconomic or educational backgrounds often face barriers to securing full-time employment or attaining higher occupational status, reflecting persistent inequalities in access to resources and opportunities. For example, evidence from historical analyses indicates that maternal occupational status has had a measurable, though historically undervalued, effect on children's outcomes, particularly for daughters, signaling the importance of cross-gender influences in status transmission. Researchers have also found that women face other barriers like caregiving responsibilities and work-family balance (SAGE Journals, Gender Research).

Comparative studies suggest that the gendered nature of labor markets continues to influence the types of jobs accessible to women, often channeling them into lower-paying or part-time roles. In some cases, women from higher socioeconomic backgrounds are more likely to secure full-time employment, as they may have greater access to education and networks that facilitate upward mobility. Research also indicates that in households where women were homemakers, children's status attainment benefited from the transmission of non-economic resources, such as cultural and social capital.

Even though women hold fewer jobs than men in some societies, women hold jobs of higher prestige than their male counterparts. This is probably because it is not beneficial for women who are married with children to go out and get lower-paying, lower status jobs because the economic benefits cancel themselves out in the end. Married working women also hold less prestigious jobs than their spouses. This is partially because married people tend to share the same economic backgrounds as well as education levels, and partially because in the process of evolutions, sexual dimorphism has triggered women to prefer wealthy husbands.

In the past, females generally attained their status through family background or marriage. While hypergamy exists today, females are becoming more independent and socially mobile in many parts of the world. The increased independence and social mobility has led to an increase in women attaining their own status rather than attaining their status through family circumstances and/or through marriage.

Treiman and Terrel (1975) cautiously note that the mother's educational level strongly affects the education level of the daughter more so than the educational level of the father.

"Many researchers have found that male and female status attainment processes are virtually identical while others have reported gender differences in the importance of mental ability and family background variables as predictors of attainment".

== Occupational status ==
Status attainment is directly related to occupational status. Occupational status and the attainment thereof is perhaps the core idea of status attainment. Status in the workforce is affected by many factors, most notably, gender, parent status, and work trends.

Globalization and economic inequality also influences occupational mobility and opportunities. Studies suggest that differences in economic systems, educational structures, and labor markets may shape status attainment differently depending on the society (SAGE Journals, 2019).

In the 1973 survey conducted in Canada, Porter began to explore ideas of occupational status attainment. John Porter started his study believing that Canadians were less mobile than Americans in terms of climbing the occupational status ladder. In fact it was quite the opposite, Canadians as well as Americans had higher occupational statuses if their parents were high on the status ladder. This study also showed that gender can be important as well. Women who have full-time jobs come from families higher up on the occupational ladder than men do. Work trends as well are a major factor in determining the occupational status of a person. We have seen a large shift of the workforce move from the agriculture aspect to largely skilled jobs. Since, few are left to labor in the agricultural field, we've found that those left are not unskilled laborers but rather farm owners. Thus a large shift in the occupational status of an average person in the agricultural sector has occurred.

== Current research ==
- A research study of the country of Vietnam was conducted by the University of Utah in 2003. The study was focused upon the status attainment processes experienced by a generation of young men and women entering school and work roles during the transition of socialism to market economy in the Socialist Republic of Vietnam (Korinek). The analysis of the research seemed to show similar results to earlier implications on how status is attained through quality education rather than job, or social status of their parents.
- Blau and Duncan model: studies by Peter M. Blau and Otis Dudley Duncan in 1962, tested the correlation between son's occupational status with father's occupational status. Their studies were limited to males and showed two aspects of a person's social class of origin: father's educational achievements and occupational prestige; both ascriptive status traits (fixed at birth). The purpose of the study was to test whether ascriptive or achieved characteristics directly affected status attainment of the child. Higher father's educational achievements could yield higher child's educational achievement due to higher expectations and more support for attainment. Higher father's occupational prestige could increase educational expectations for the child as well as providing financial resources to support higher education. This model set the foundation for further investigation.
- Blau and Duncan both analyzed status attainment within a wide framework by using a basic mobility model. They thought that it would be easiest to analyze if they examined the process by which men move up and down the social ladder in their family of origin to adult positions in a hierarchy of occupations. "Rather than depicting the father-son relationship in a cross-tabular form, the regression method made it possible to approximate the process by which the son's status was attained" Schoon, Ingrid (2008), A Transgenerational Model of Status Attainment: the Potential Mediating Role of School Motivation and Education, National Institute Economic Review, pp. 72–81. This model was coined the Wisconsin model. It focused on the processes of individuals developing personal qualities, such as motivation or skills at a given task that lead to educational achievement and eventually to positions on the occupational ladder. Acknowledgments between education, family status, and young people's ability levels as well as their motivations and aspirations were all contributive to one's status attainment.
- Wisconsin model: developed by William H. Sewell and his associates, further studied the mold set forth by Blau and Duncan. Their addition of variables such as: a child's mental ability, educational achievement, peer influence and personal aspirations, helped link stratification and mental ability inputs through a set of social psychological and behavioral mechanisms to educational and occupational attainment. These subjective variables added a social psychological side that Blau and Duncan lacked in their research. The study did not make any definite solutions of child status attainment but contributed greatly to encourage even further research.
- Research on status attainment that focuses on globalization, inequality in education, and access to social capital. The debate continues on the importance on individual achievement and structural inequality in shaping social mobility (Taylor & Francis, 2024).
- Other studies have spurred the debate over what constitutes status attainment? In the UK for example, controversies arise over whether or not one's own merit (ability and effort) should have precedence over one's own background and class distinctions. Saunders found "that class background only has a small influence on occupational attainment, while individual ability and motivation play by far a greater role".

== See also ==
- Competition (economics)
- Deference
- Economic mobility
- Grandiosity
- Identity politics
- Impression management
- Kyriarchy
- Nationalism and sports
- Positional good
- Social mobility
- Status symbol
- White savior
- Winner and loser culture
