= Robert Hauser =

Robert Hauser may refer to:

- Robert M. Hauser, American sociologist
- Robert B. Hauser (1919–1994), American cinematographer
