= Occupational prestige =

Public perception of an individual's job

Sociologists use the concept of occupational prestige (also known as job prestige) to measure the relative social-class positions people may achieve by practicing a given occupation. Occupational prestige results from the consensual rating of a job - based on the belief of that job's worthiness. The term prestige itself refers to the admiration and respect that a particular occupation holds in a society. Occupational prestige is prestige independent of particular individuals who occupy a job. Sociologists have identified prestige rankings for more than 700 occupations based on results from a series of national surveys. They have created a scale (with 0 being the lowest possible score and 100 being the highest) and then rank given occupations based on survey results. Occupational prestige differentials have wide ranging implications regarding the distribution of social resources and life chances, which can translate into nested sets of social inclusion and exclusion.

== History ==
People rate the ‘general standing’ of an occupation (the most common question). It is taken to be a measure of occupational prestige and hence of the social status of occupations. Many other criteria have been proposed, including ‘social usefulness’ as well as ‘prestige’ and ‘status’ themselves. In order to obtain the scale of occupations (which is invariably taken to be national in application), respondents' ratings are aggregated.

Job prestige did not become a fully developed concept until 1947 when the National Opinion Research Center (NORC), under the leadership of Cecil C. North, conducted a survey which held questions regarding age, education, and income in regard to the prestige of certain jobs. This was the first time job prestige had ever been researched, measured, and taught. Duncan's Socioeconomic Index (DSI, SEI) became one of the most important outcomes of this survey, as it gave various occupational categories different scores based on the survey results as well as the result of the 1950 Census of Population. During the 1960s the NORC did a second generation of surveys which became the basis for the socioeconomic status (SES) score until the 1980s as well as the foundation for Trieman's International Prestige Scale in 1977. Out of these surveys and research job prestige has been defined in various ways. Some definitions include:

- The consensual nature of rating a job based on the collective belief of its worthiness.
- Prestige is the measurement of the "desirability" of an occupation in terms of socioeconomic rewards.
- Prestige reflects factual, scientific knowledge about the material rewards attached to certain occupations.

Different people seem to weight these issues differently in their understanding of prestige. Most people seem to implicitly view prestige as a weighted average of income and education and this is the operational definition used in indices like DSI and ISEI. However other people (especially in the working class) seem to have more moralized notions of how much a job helps society and would, for instance, rate doctors high and lawyers low even though both jobs require postgraduate degrees and earn high incomes.

The indicators most commonly used to measure SES come from Duncan's (1961) Socioeconomic Index (SEI), a composite of occupational prestige, income, and education. Duncan used data from North and Hart's study of 1949 occupational prestige and census data to conduct the first correlational study of the statistical relationship between education, income, and occupation. Duncan focused on white males with at least a high school education and income of $3,500 or more in 1949, and found correlations among income, public-ranking of occupational prestige, and educational level of around 0.75. The study did not report whether the index included a sample of ethnic minorities.

The SEI model continues to influence the way researchers measure SES. The National Educational Longitudinal Study (NELS:88, NCES, 1988) initially employed a measure of SES developed by Stevens and Featherman (1981) based on father's income, mother's income, father's education, mother's education, and father's and mother's occupation as rated by the SEI model. In the first-year follow-up study, the National Center for Education Statistics (1990) used the Nakao and Treas (1994) revised SEI model.

== Calculating occupational prestige in the United States ==
During the 1960s through the 1980s job prestige was calculated in a variety of different ways. People were given index cards with about 100 or so jobs listed on them and had to rank them from most to least prestigious. This ranking system was known as placing jobs in a "ladder of social standing." Another method they used in this time period was to have the respondents rank jobs on a "horizontal ruler" using specific guidelines such as estimated income, freedom of choice, and how interesting the job was. No matter what the method the outcomes were generally the same.

Although pay and fame have little to do with occupational prestige, measures of prestige are a part of the concept of socioeconomic status (SES). Jobs with high prestige are more likely to have a higher level of pay stability, better lateral career mobility, and established professional associations. Some popular scales that are used to measure SES include the Hollingshead four-factor index of social status, the Nam-Powers-Boyd scale, and Duncan's Socioeconomic Index.

A 2007 Harris Poll of 1,010 U.S. adults suggested that occupational prestige is linked to perceived impact on community welfare, the highest ranking jobs being firefighter, scientists, and teachers. Lower ranking jobs include well-paid positions such as brokers, actors, and bankers. Police officers and engineers tended to fall somewhere in the middle of the ladder. According to The Harris Poll (2007), the following are the changes over the last quarter century of American's view as the most and least prestigious jobs:

- Those who see teachers as having "very great" prestige has risen 25 points from 29 to 54 percent;
- Those who say lawyers have "very great" prestige has fallen 14 points, from 36 to 22 percent;
- Scientists have fallen 12 points from 66 to 54 percent;
- Athletes have fallen ten points from 26 to 16 percent;
- Physicians have fallen nine points from 61 to 52 percent;
- Bankers have fallen seven points from 17 to 10 percent;
- Entertainers have fallen six points from 18 percent to 12 percent.

== List of occupations by prestige ==
=== Occupations by prestige (NORC) ===
The list of occupations by prestige assembled by the National Opinion Research Center (NORC) in 1989 is the one most commonly used. The list includes over 800 occupations, but only the top 30 with the highest prestige scores are listed here.

Prestige scores
Occupation	Prestige
Surgeon	76
Astronaut	72
Mayor of a Large City	72
Professor in a Leading College or University	71
Dentist	70
Nuclear Technician	70
Obstetrician/Gynecologist	70
Justice of a Municipal Court	69
Airline Pilot	69
Aeronautical Engineer	69
Member of the Board of a Large Corporation	69
Architect	67
Chemist	67
Colonel in the Army	67
Engineer	67
Pharmacist	67
Secret Service Agent	66
Nurse/Psychiatrist	66
Computer Scientist/Computer Hardware Engineer	64
Lawyer	64
Environmental Scientist	65
Fire Department Lieutenant	62
Banker	61
High School Teacher	61
Sociologist	61
Soldier	60
Policeman	60
Business Entrepreneur	58
Chief Technology Officer	58
Accountant	57
Actor	57

== See also ==
- Achieved status
- Identity performance
- Occupational inequality
- Otis Dudley Duncan
- Role engulfment
- Status attainment
- Status symbol
