= Marshall W. Meyer =

American sociologist (born 1942)

Marshall Warner Meyer (born 24 June 1942) is an American sociologist and management scientist.

After completing his Bachelor of Arts degree at Columbia University in 1964, Meyer pursued graduate study at the University of Chicago, where he earned a Master of Arts and doctorate in 1965 and 1967, respectively, Meyer taught at Harvard University, Cornell University, and the University of California, Riverside before joining the University of Pennsylvania in 1987 as Anheuser-Busch Term Professor of Management. He held the professorship until 1992. In 2002, Meyer was awarded the Richard A. Sapp Professorship. He was appointed Tsai Wan-Tsai Professor in the Wharton School in 2010, and granted emeritus status upon retirement.

== Selected publications ==
- Blau, Peter M.; Meyer, Marshall W. (1971). Bureaucracy in Modern Society (2 ed.). Random House.
- Meyer, Marshall W. (1979). Change in Public Bureaucracies. Cambridge University Press. ISBN 9780521226707.
- Meyer, Marshall W.; Zucker, Lynne G. (1989). Permanently Failing Organizations. Sage. ISBN 9780803932593.
