= Blau space =

Demographic characteristics as coordinates

Blau space consists of the multidimensional coordinate system, created by considering the set of socio-demographic variables as dimensions. All socio-demographic characteristics are potential elements of Blau space, including continuous characteristics such as age, years of education, income, occupational prestige, geographic location, and so forth. In addition, categorical measures of socio-demographic characteristics such as race, sex, religion, birthplace, and others are Blau dimensions. "Blau space" is a theoretical construct which was developed by Miller McPherson and named after Peter Blau. It was later elaborated by McPherson and Ranger-Moore.

The organizing force in Blau space is the homophily principle, which argues that the flow of information from person to person is a declining function of distance in Blau space. Persons located at great distance in Blau space are very unlikely to interact, which creates the conditions for social differences in any characteristic that is transmitted through social communication. The homophily principle thus localizes communication in Blau space, leading to the development of social niches for human activity and social organization.

== See also ==
- Information silo
- Parameter space
