= Michael Mayerfeld Bell =

American sociologist (born 1957)

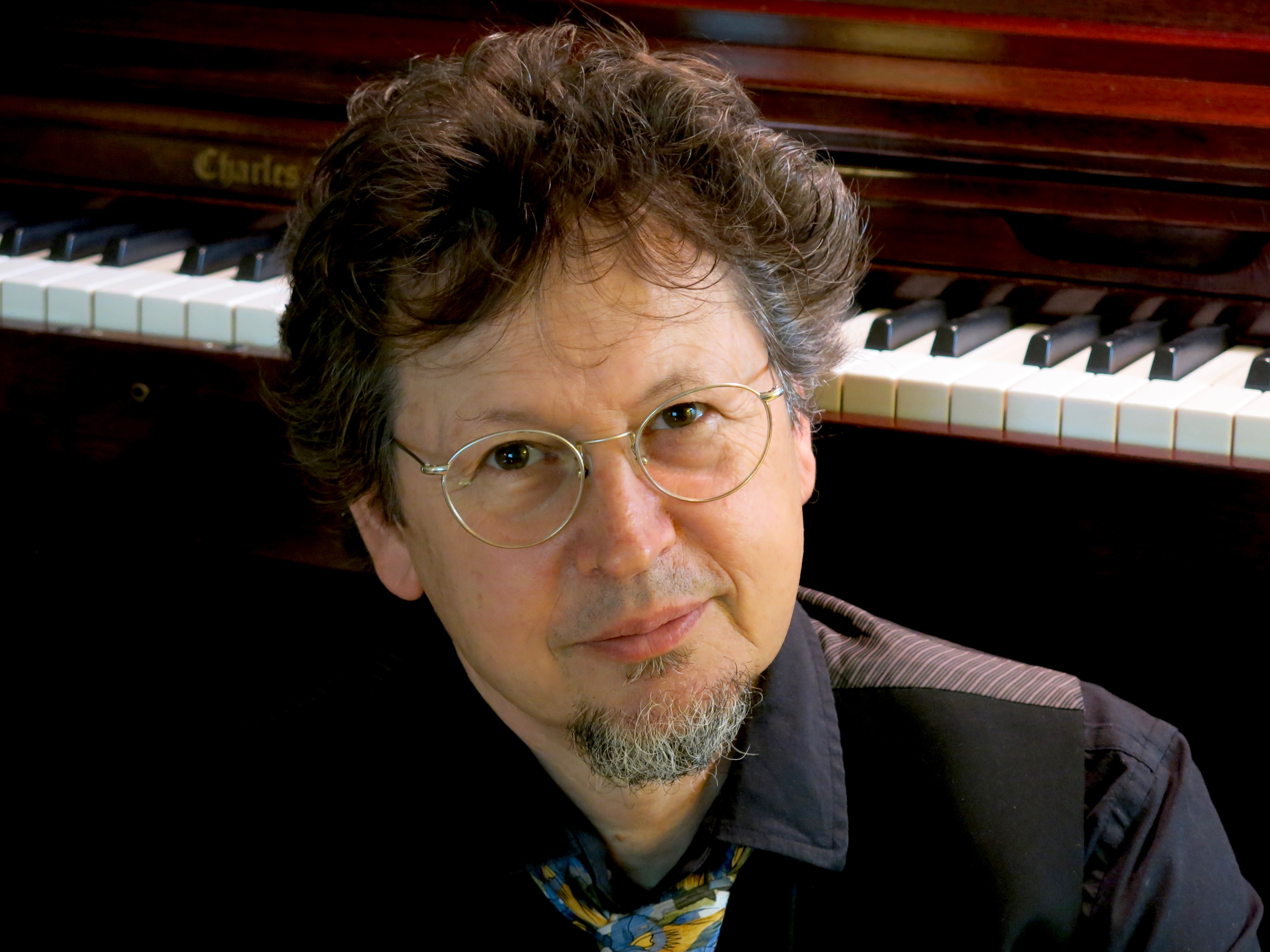
- Born: June 7, 1957 (age 69); Providence, Rhode Island
- Education: Wesleyan University (B.A.); Yale University (Ph.D.)
- Known for: Environmental sociology, cultural sociology, political sociology, sociological theory, agroecology, sociology of religion
- Scientific career
- Fields: Sociology, environmental sociology, agroecology, classical and grassroots music
- Workplaces: University of Wisconsin-Madison
- Doctoral advisor: Kai Erikson

Michael Bell is an American sociologist, author, and musician. He is currently Vilas Distinguished Achievement Professor of Community and Environmental Sociology at the University of Wisconsin-Madison, where he is Chair of the Department of Community and Environmental Sociology. In addition, Bell served as Director of UW-Madison's Center for Integrated Agricultural Systems (CIAS) from 2011 to 2019. Created in 1989, CIAS is a research center for sustainable agriculture programs that respond to the needs of farmers and citizens.

Bell is best known for his work in developing a dialogic approach to sociology and environmental sociology. His most recent major work is City of the Good: Nature, Religion, and the Ancient Search for What is Right (Princeton, 2018) which traces the tension between pagan and bourgeois traditions of nature and religion that emerged with the rise of cities and empires. He is also the author of Childerley: Nature and Morality in a Country Village, which won the 1995 Best Book Award in the Sociology of Culture from the American Sociological Association, and of Farming for Us All: Practical Agriculture and the Cultivation of Sustainability, which won an Outstanding Academic Title award from the American Library Association. Bell is as well the lead author of An Invitation to Environmental Sociology, a textbook now in its sixth edition.

In the area of agroecology, Bell has worked with the soil scientist William Bland and the agronomist Stéphane Bellon to develop holon agroecology, an approach that emphasizes the role of context in agroecological relations and argues that we can learn from context without universalization. Along with his co-author Jason Orne, Bell makes a related argument for a "multilogical" approach to qualitative methods in An Invitation to Qualitative Fieldwork (Routledge, 2015).

Drawing on the dialogic philosopher Mikhail Bakhtin, Bell first developed the notion of "mutlilogics" in The Strange Music of Social Life (Temple, 2011). Bell applies multilogical method to a classical composition of his, "Assumptions," which invites improvisation from classical musicians in order to argue against "total explanation" and the desire for complete predictability in sociology. Bell contends that sociology should equally welcome the "dictability" of the strange. Ten scholars respond in the book, including Judith Blau, John Levi Martin, Andrew Abbott, Shamus Khan, Diana Crane, Vanina Leschziner, and Marc Steinberg. The book concludes with Bell's response to the responses.

Michael Bell is a mandolinist, guitarist and composer of grassroots and classical music, and has appeared with the Barn Owl Band on A Prairie Home Companion. He currently performs with Graminy, a Wisconsin-based "class-grass" ensemble and with the Elm Duo, a duet with his daughter.

== Notable publications ==
- Bell, Michael M., Loka L. Ashwood, Isaac Sohn Leslie, and Laura Hanson Schlachter. 2021. An Invitation to Environmental Sociology. 6th edition. Thousand Oaks, CA: Sage. ISBN 9781506366012
- Legun, Katharine, Julie Keller, Michael M. Bell, and Michael S. Carolan, eds. 2020. The Cambridge Handbook of Environmental Sociology. 2 volumes. Cambridge and New York: Cambridge University Press. ISBN 9781108554510
- Bell, Michael M. 2018. City of the Good: Nature, Religion, and the Ancient Search for What Is Right. Princeton, NJ: Princeton University Press. ISBN 9780691165097
- Orne, Jason and Michael M. Bell. 2015. An Invitation to Qualitative Fieldwork. New York and London: Routledge. ISBN 9780415536622
- Bell, Michael M. and others. 2011. The Strange Music of Social Life: A Dialogue on Dialogic Sociology. Ann Goetting, ed. Philadelphia: Temple University Press. ISBN 1439907242
- Bell, Michael M. 2009. “The Problem of the Original Capitalist.” Environment and Planning A 41(6): 1276–1282.
- Bland, William L. and Michael M. Bell. 2007. “A Holon Approach to Agroecology.” International Journal of Agricultural Sustainability. 5(4): 280–294.
- Campbell, Hugh; Michael M. Bell, and Margaret Finney, eds. 2006. Country Boys: Masculinity and Rural Life. Rural Studies Series of the Rural Sociological Society. College Station, PA: Penn State University Press. ISBN 978-0-271-02875-0
- Bell, Michael M.; with Donna Bauer, Sue Jarnagin, and Greg Peter. 2004. Farming for Us All: Practical Agriculture and the Cultivation of Sustainability. Rural Studies Series of the Rural Sociological Society. College Station, PA: Penn State University Press. ISBN 978-0-271-02387-8
- Bell, Michael M. and Fredrick Hendricks, eds., with Azril Bacal. 2003. Walking Towards Justice: Democratization in Rural Life. Research in Rural Sociology and Development book series. Amsterdam and New York: JAI/Elsevier. ISBN 0762309547
- Bell, Michael M. and Michael Gardiner, editors. 1998. Bakhtin and the Human Sciences: No Last Words. London: Sage. ISBN 9780761955306
- Bell, Michael M. 1997. “The Ghosts of Place,” Theory and Society. 26:813-836.
- Bell, Michael M. 1994. Childerley: Nature and Morality in a Country Village. Chicago: University of Chicago Press. ISBN 0226041980
- Bell, Michael M. 1985. The Face of Connecticut: People, Geology, and the Land. Hartford, CT: Connecticut Geological and Natural History Survey.
