= Significant other =

Person's partner in an intimate relationship

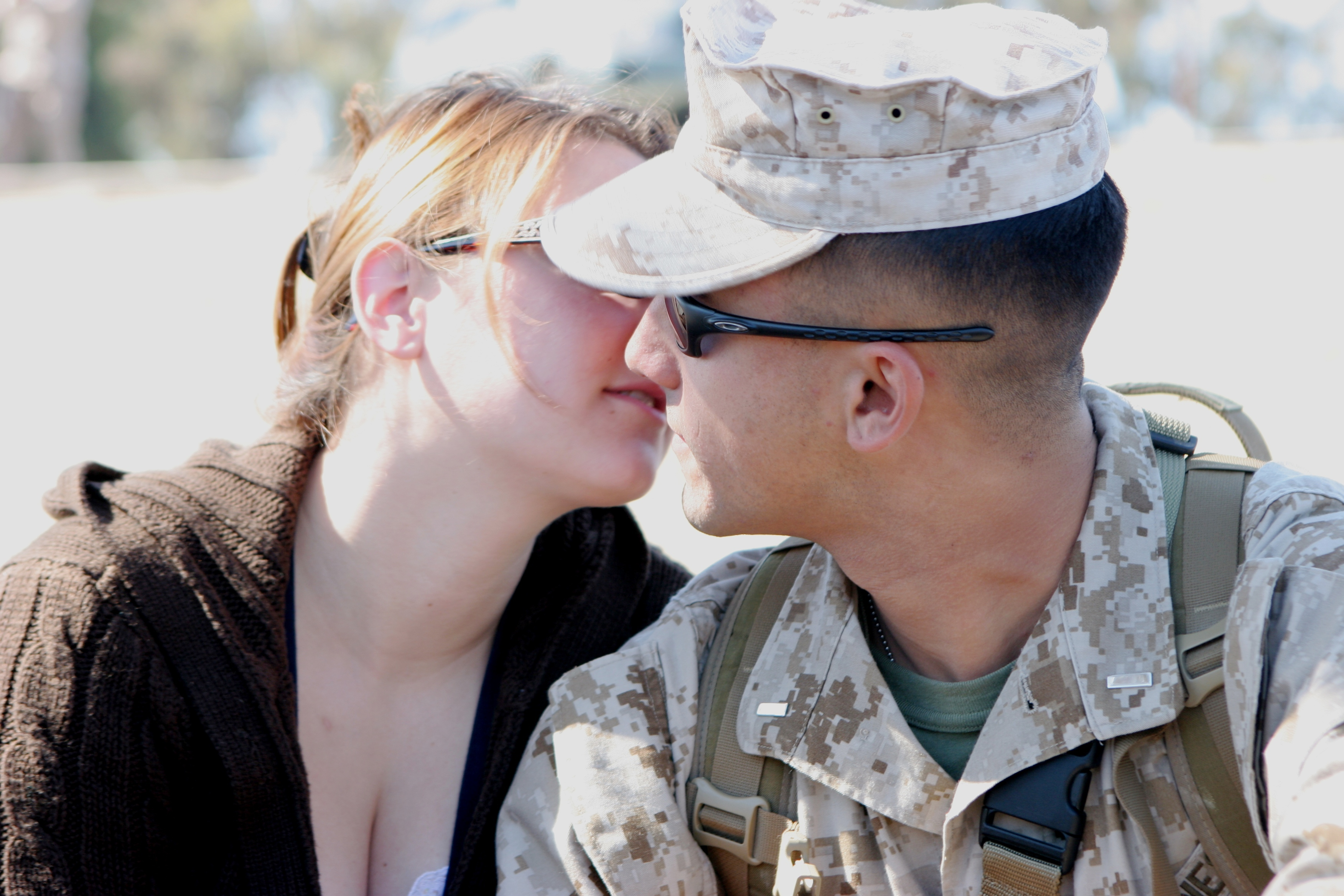
A United States Marine kisses a woman described as his "significant other" before going to Afghanistan.

The term "significant other" (SO) has different uses in psychology and in colloquial language. Colloquially, "significant other" is used as a gender-neutral term for a person's partner in an intimate relationship without disclosing or presuming anything about marital status, relationship status, gender identity, or sexual orientation. Synonyms with similar properties include sweetheart, other half, better half, spouse, domestic partner, lover, paramour, soulmate, and life partner. The psychology concept has a broader scope: "significant other" refers to any person who has great importance to an individual's life or well-being.

== Scientific use ==
Its usage in psychology and sociology is very different from its colloquial use. In psychology, a significant other is any person who has great importance to an individual's life or well-being. In sociology, it describes any person or persons with a strong influence on an individual's self-concept. Although the influence of significant others on individuals was long theorized, the first actual measurements of the influence of significant others on individuals were made by Archie O. Haller, Edward L. Fink, and Joseph Woelfel at the University of Wisconsin.

Haller, Fink, and Woelfel are associates of the Wisconsin model of status attainment. They surveyed 100 Wisconsin adolescents, measured their educational and occupational aspirations, and identified the set of other individuals who communicated with the students and served as examples for them. They then contacted the significant others, directly measured their expectations for the adolescent's educational and occupational attainments, and calculated the impact of these expectations on the aspirations of the students. Results of the research showed that the expectations of significant others were the single most potent influences on the student's aspirations. This usage is synonymous with the term "relevant other" and can also be found in plural form, "significant others".

The significant other protects, rewards, and punishes the child as a way of aiding the child's development. This usually takes about six or seven years, after which the significant other is no longer needed, and the child moves on to a general "other" which is not a real person, but an abstract notion of what society deems good or bad.

== History ==
The first known use of the terms "significant other person" and "significant other people" is by the U.S. psychiatrist Harry Stack Sullivan in the article "Conceptions of Modern Psychiatry" in the journal: Psychiatry: Journal of the Biology and Pathology of Interpersonal Relations, published in 1940. The phrase was popularised in the United States by Armistead Maupin's 1987 book Significant Others, and in the UK by the 1989 TV series Only Fools and Horses, in which Derek Trotter uses the phrase a number of times when referring to his long-term partner Raquel Turner.

== See also ==
- POSSLQ
- Spouse
