= Interactive activation and competition networks =

Interactive activation and competition (IAC) networks are artificial neural networks used to model memory and intuitive generalizations. They are made up of nodes or artificial neurons which are arrayed and activated in ways that emulate the behaviors of human memory.

The IAC model is used by the parallel distributed processing (PDP) Group and is associated with James L. McClelland and David E. Rumelhart; it is described in detail in their book Explorations in Parallel Distributed Processing: A Handbook of Models, Programs, and Exercises. This model does not contradict any currently known biological data or theories, and its performance is close enough to human performance as to warrant further investigation.
