= Taissa S. Hauser =

American sociologist and demographer

- Born: Taissa Louise Silvers; February 14, 1942; Detroit, Michigan, U.S.
- Died: January 10, 2014 (aged 71)
- Occupations: Demography, Quantitative sociology
- Known for: Social stratification, social statistics, and aging
- Spouse: Robert M. Hauser

Academic background
- Education: University of Michigan

Academic work
- Institutions: University of Wisconsin–Madison

Taissa S. "Tess" Hauser (February 14, 1942 – January 10, 2014) was an American sociologist and demographer. She was a Senior Scientist Emeritus in the College of Letters and Science/Sociology and the administrative director of the Wisconsin Longitudinal Study (WLS) of the Department of Sociology at the University of Wisconsin–Madison, where she worked from 1970 to 2011.

A member of the Population Association of America, Hauser was known for both her research work and mentoring in demography and quantitative sociology. She introduced methods to improve survey research and longitudinal studies. Beginning at a time when data was stored on punch cards, she developed computer programs and practices for the archiving, analysis and secure sharing of confidential longitudinal data. She worked closely with her husband, research scientist Robert M. Hauser, examining issues such as social stratification, social mobility, impacts of education, race and gender, persistence of inequality across generations, and aging. Their analysis and her subsequent work on the Committee of Experts at the University of Wisconsin addressed gender and racial inequities in the 1980s.

== Early life and education ==
Taissa Louise Silvers was a daughter of Harris and Saralee (née Hilsenrath) Silvers of Detroit, Michigan. As a student at Wayne State University in Detroit she completed student field projects in folklore on the topics "From Folk Music to Progressive Jazz" (1962) and "Local Recipes for Meat Puddings" (1962).

She spent summers as an orchestral Fellow at the Tanglewood Music Center, a highly competitive program supported by the Boston Symphony Orchestra. Between 1960 and 1963 she played both violin and viola at Tanglewood, performing with the Orchestra of the Berkshire Music Center. She played viola in the University of Michigan Symphony Orchestra in May 1962.

By the time she married Robert M. Hauser on May 24, 1964., Taissa had completed her B.S. at Wayne State University. In 1967 she received a master's degree in Science from the University of Michigan in educational psychology.

== Career ==
In 1967, Robert Hauser joined the department of sociology and anthropology at Brown University. Taissa, unable to find relevant employment, helped her husband with his statistical analyses and typed his 500-page dissertation. In 1969 he joined the department of sociology at the University of Wisconsin–Madison and he and Taissa moved to Madison, Wisconsin.

=== Wisconsin Longitudinal Study ===
In 1970, William H. Sewell, the initiator of the Wisconsin Longitudinal Study (WLS), recruited Tess to join himself and Robert Hauser on the project. Initially designed to study post-secondary hopes and educational outcomes of the 1957 Wisconsin high school graduating class, the project became one of the most extensive long-term studies to follow subjects throughout their life-course. It has involved over 10,000 graduates and their families, lasting over 60 years. It has enabled the Hausers and their many students and collaborators to examine a wide array of social and economic factors and study issues like social stratification, mobility, inequality, education, development and aging.

Tess Hauser became one of its principal investigators, with Sewell and Robert Hauser. She was primarily responsible for the tracing and interviewing of the 10,317 subjects in the project. In a history of the department, Tess Hauser is credited with "much of the success of the WLS research operation over a forty-year period". A Faculty Senate resolution stated: “Her work changed the discipline of Sociology, the UW-Madison Sociology department, and faculty, staff and students within the department in important and profound ways.”

Her contributions to methods of survey research included procedures for locating respondents in longitudinal studies. Her location methods led to exceptional sample retention rates as high as 98%. One of her goals was to establish methods of internal documentation to permanently record research activities in ways that would enable the research to be independently reproducible at any time. She designed and implemented specialized computer software to archive longitudinal data, and to store and analyze confidential data with high levels of security. Through the design of the WLS web site she supported dissemination of scientific publications, documentation and data, providing a variety of services including the ability to publicly share non-identifiable data.

=== Academic Staff Compensation ===
In 1986–1987, the University of Wisconsin introduced a new Academic Staff Compensation Plan. Chancellor Donna Shalala asked the Hausers to assess the new compensation structure for Category A Academic Staff. They reported that there were pay inequities related to official titles and salaries that could not be explained by education, work experience, or free market factors. Women experienced a 13.7 percent deficit in salaries due to gender alone, and minorities experienced a 6.3 percent deficit due to minority status alone. As a result of the Hauser's 1989 report, the university took action. Tess Hauser served on the Committee of Experts that was established to implement recommendations addressing gender and racial inequities and improve conditions at the university.

== Recognition ==
In 1989, the University of Wisconsin Senate passed a resolution recognizing both Robert and Taissa Hauser for their contributions to the achievement of gender and minority equity at the university.

For 2002-2003 Tess Hauser received the Judith S. Craig Distinguished Service Award from the College of Letters and Science. The college recognized her for both her scientific work and her work as a mentor, assisting undergraduate and graduate students, post-doctoral researchers, academic staff, and faculty in ways that reached far beyond the university.

Tess Hauser officially retired in 2004, but soon returned to the project, remaining until 2011. She died of cancer on January 10, 2014. Her contributions to the research which had identified and documented inequities at the university were recognized again in a Memorial Resolution in 2015.

The January 2016 issue of The ANNALS of the American Academy of Political and Social Science, entitled "Living in a High-Inequality Regime" was dedicated to both Taissa and Robert Hauser, and recognized their combined work and impact in areas including social stratification, mobility, social and economic inequality, educational practice, adolescent development, and aging.

== Selected bibliography ==
- Roetker, Nicholas S.; Page, C. David; Yonker, James A.; Chang, Vicky; Roan, Carol L.; Herd, Pamela; Hauser, Taissa S.; Hauser, Robert M.; Atwood, Craig S. (October 2013). "Assessment of Genetic and Nongenetic Interactions for the Prediction of Depressive Symptomatology: An Analysis of the Wisconsin Longitudinal Study Using Machine Learning Algorithms". American Journal of Public Health. 103 (S1): S136–S144. doi:10.2105/AJPH.2012.301141. PMC 3786749. PMID 23927508.
- Chabris, Christopher F.; Hebert, Benjamin M.; Benjamin, Daniel J.; Beauchamp, Jonathan; Cesarini, David; van der Loos, Matthijs; Johannesson, Magnus; Magnusson, Patrik K. E.; Lichtenstein, Paul; Atwood, Craig S.; Freese, Jeremy; Hauser, Taissa S.; Hauser, Robert M.; Christakis, Nicholas; Laibson, David (November 2012). "Most Reported Genetic Associations With General Intelligence Are Probably False Positives". Psychological Science. 23 (11): 1314–1323. doi:10.1177/0956797611435528. PMC 3498585. PMID 23012269.
- Benjamin, Daniel J.; Cesarini, David; Chabris, Christopher F.; Glaeser, Edward L.; Laibson, David I.; Guðnason, Vilmundur; Harris, Tamara B.; Launer, Lenore J.; Purcell, Shaun; Smith, Albert Vernon; Johannesson, Magnus; Magnusson, Patrik K.E.; Beauchamp, Jonathan P.; Christakis, Nicholas A.; Atwood, Craig S.; Hebert, Benjamin; Freese, Jeremy; Hauser, Robert M.; Hauser, Taissa S.; Grankvist, Alexander; Hultman, Christina M.; Lichtenstein, Paul (1 September 2012). "The Promises and Pitfalls of Genoeconomics". Annual Review of Economics. 4 (1): 627–662. doi:10.1146/annurev-economics-080511-110939. ISSN 1941-1383. PMC 3592970. PMID 23482589.
- Sewell, William H; Hauser, Robert M; Springer, Kristen W; Hauser, Taissa S (1 January 2003). "As We Age: A Review of the Wisconsin Longitudinal Study, 1957-2001". Research in Social Stratification and Mobility. 20: 3–111. doi:10.1016/S0276-5624(03)20001-9. ISSN 0276-5624.
- Hauser, Robert M.; Sewell, William H.; Logan, John A.; Hauser, Taissa S.; Ryff, Carol; Caspi, Avshalom; MacDonald, Maurice M. (31 July 1992). "The Wisconsin Longitudinal Study: Adults As Parents And Children At Age 50". IASSIST Quarterly. 16 (1): 23. doi:10.29173/iq631.
- Hauser, Robert M.; Mechanic, David; Haller, Archibald; Hauser, Taissa S. (1982). Social Structure and Behavtior: Essays in Honzor of Williamn Hamnilton Sewell. New York: Academic Press. ISBN 1483240401.
- Clarridge, Brian R.; Sheehy, Linda L.; Hauser, Taissa S. (1978). "Tracing Members of a Panel: A 17-Year Follow-Up" (PDF). Sociological Methodology. 9. San Francisco: Jossey-Bass: 185–203. doi:10.2307/270809. JSTOR 270809.
