= Judith Blau =

American sociologist

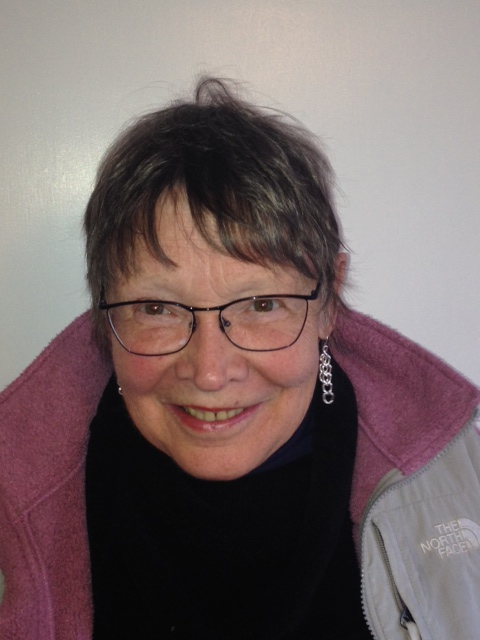
- Education: University of Chicago B.A. University of Chicago M.A.
- Notable work: Human Rights: Beyond the Liberal Vision

Judith Blau (born April 27, 1942) is an American sociologist and professor emerita of the University of North Carolina at Chapel Hill. Most of her academic career has been devoted to teaching and writing about human rights, and she retired to Wellfleet, Massachusetts, where she continues to teach.

== Education and career ==
Judith was awarded a BA from the University of Chicago in 1964 and a MA, also from Chicago, in 1967, and a PhD in 1972, from Northwestern University. Blau taught at Baruch College as an assistant professor from 1973 to 1976, held a post-doctoral fellowship at Albert Einstein College of Medicine (1976–1978), taught at the State University of New York at Albany (1978–1982), and the University of North Carolina at Chapel Hill (1982–2013) where she founded and chaired the Social and Economic Justice minor within the Sociology department. She founded and directed the Human Rights Center of Chapel Hill and Carrboro in 2009, which was an NGO that advocated for the rights of refugees and migrants. Her husband, Peter Michael Blau taught in the same department, as emeritus professor, until his death March 12, 2002. She has two daughters, Reva Blau and Pamela Blau.

Blau also taught at Nankai University in Tianjin, China, Hunter College, New York University, Mary Baldwin College and spent an academic year at the Netherlands Institute for Advanced Study.

Her early career was devoted, first to a study of scientists and, then, to a study of architects. In the early 1970s, both physics and architecture were undergoing dramatic transformation. Physicists had early access to the internet, allowing them to participate in international scientific exchanges, in defiance of the Cold War. Postmodernism was displacing modernism in architecture, just as postmodernism affected philosophy and art theory. She has worked in several sociological specialties, and gradually discovered that she could wed her passion for social and economic justice with the same scholarly discipline she brought to her study of communications among scientists.

In her current research on constitutions, she has found that the U.S. is an outlier in two respects: it never ratifies human rights treaties and has not revised the Constitution's Bill of Rights. The United States is in a small minority of states that do not recognize economic, social and cultural rights. The US is also an outlier on economic inequality, with immense gaps between the 1 percent and the 99 percent.

== Memberships and awards ==
Blau served on the Executive Council of the American Sociological Association, on the Board of the North Carolina chapter of ACLU, as President of the Southern Sociological Society, and was editor of Social Forces. She founded the U.S. chapter of Sociologists without Borders in 2002. Blau served as its president from 2002 to 2011. She was the recipient of the 2006 Lester F. Ward Award of the Association for Applied and Clinical Sociology, the 2013 annual Orange County Pauli Murray Award, and the American Sociological Association's Distinguished Career Award for the Practice of Sociology, and is a lifetime honorary member of the Cooperstown Baseball Hall of Fame.

== Publications ==
Human Rights: Beyond the Liberal Vision, co-authored with Alberto Moncada, is a book that critiques American society. It has been called a "brave book" by the journal Social Forces.

=== Sole-authored and sole-edited books ===
- Architects and Firms. Cambridge: MA: MIT Press, 1983. ISBN 9780262521284
- The Shape of Culture: A Study of Contemporary Cultural Patterns in the U.S. New York: Cambridge University Press, 1989. ISBN 9780521437936
- Social Contracts and Economic Markets. New York: Plenum, 1993. ISBN 0306443910
- Blackwell Companion to Sociology (ed.) Malden MA: Blackwell, 2001. ISBN 9781405122672
- Race in the Schools: Perpetuating White Dominance? Boulder, CO: Lynne Rienner, 2003. Recipient of the American Sociological Association's Oliver Cromwell Cox Award. ISBN 1588263339
- The Paris Agreement: Climate Change, Solidarity and Human Rights. New York, NY: Palgrave 2017 ISBN 978-3-319-53541-8
- Crimes Against Humanity: Climate Change and Trump's Legacy of Planetary Destruction. New York: Routledge, 2018.

=== Co-authored books (selected) ===
- Judith Blau, Mark La Gory, and John Pipkin, eds., Professionals and Urban Form. Albany: State University of New York Press, 1983. ISBN 0-87395-675-3.
- John Pipkin, Mark La Gory, and Judith Blau, eds. Remaking the City: Social Science Perspectives On Urban Design. Albany: State University of New York Press, 1983. ISBN 0-87395-677-X.
- Judith Blau and Alberto Moncada, Human Rights: Beyond the Liberal Vision. Lanham, MA: Rowman & Littlefield, 2005. ISBN 9780742542426
- Judith Blau and Alberto Moncada, Justice in the United States: Human Rights and the U.S. Constitution. Lanham, MA: Rowman & Littlefield, 2006. ISBN 9780742545595
- Judith Blau and Alberto Moncada, Freedoms and Solidarities: We Humans. Lanham, MA: Rowman & Littlefield, 2007. ISBN 9780742548022
- Judith Blau and Alberto Moncada, Human Rights: A Primer. Boulder: Paradigm, 2009. ISBN 1594516146
- Judith Blau and Louis Edgar Esparza, Human Rights: A Primer. 2nd ed. New York: Routledge, 2016. ISBN 9781138195035
- Judith Blau, David L Brunsma, Alberto Moncada and Catherine Zimmer, The Leading Rogue State: The U.S. and Human Rights. Boulder: Paradigm Publishers, 2008. ISBN 978-1-59451-588-0
- Reva Blau, Judith Blau, Climate Chaos and Its Origins in Slavery and Capitalism (Anthem Sociological Perspectives on Human Rights and Development) Hardcover – September 15, 2020 ISBN 978-1785275272

=== Co-edited books (selected) ===
- Arnold Foster and Judith Blau, eds., Art and Society: Readings in the Sociology of Art. Albany: State University of New York Press, 1989. ISBN 978-0-7914-01170
- Judith Blau and Norman Goodman, eds., Social Roles and Social Institutions: Essays in Honor of Rose Laub Coser. New Brunswick: Transaction Press, 1995. ISBN 978-1-56000-797-5
- Judith Blau and Keri Iyall Smith, eds., Public Sociology Reader. Lanham, MD: Rowman & Littlefield, 2006 ISBN 978-0-7425-4587-8
- Judith Blau and Marina Karides, eds., The World and US Social Forums. Rowman & Littlefield, 2009. ISBN 978-0-7391-3689-8
- Judith Blau and Mark Frezzo, eds., Sociology and Human Rights: A Bill of Rights for the 21st Century. Los Angeles: Sage, 2012. ISBN 1412991382
- Keri Iyall Smith, Louis Esparza and ____ Human Rights Of the People, For the People: How to Critique and Revise the U.S. Constitution. New York: Routledge, 2017. ISBN 978-1-13820416-4

=== Articles and book chapters (selected) ===
- Judith Blau, "Patterns of Communication and Theoretical High Energy Physicists," Sociometry 37 (1974): 391–406.
- Judith Blau and Peter M. Blau, "The Cost of Inequality: Metropolitan Structure and Violent Crime," American Sociological Review 47 (February 1982): 114–129.
- Judith Blau, "Elite Arts, the de Rigeuer and the Less," Social Forces 64 (June 1986): 875–905.
- Judith Blau, "The Context and Content of Collaboration: Architecture and the Social Sciences," Journal of Architectural Education 45 (Fall 1991): 36–40.
- Kenneth C. Land, Glenn Deane, and Judith Blau, "Religious Pluralism, Social Conditions, and Spatial Diffusion: An Analysis of Their Effects on Church Membership," American Sociological Review 56 (April 1991): 237–249.
- Blau, Judith; Brown, Eric S. (2001). "Du Bois and Diasporic Identity: The Veil and the Unveiling Project". Sociological Theory. 19 (2): 219–233. doi:10.1111/0735-2751.00137. S2CID 145403083.
- Judith Blau and Charles Heying, "Historically Black Organizations in the Nonprofit Sector." Nonprofit and Voluntary Sector Quarterly 25 (December 1996): 540–545.
- Judith Blau, "Alley Art: Can We…. See….. the End of Ontology?" pp. 187–208 in Jonathan Turner (ed.), Handbook of Sociological Theory (New York: Kluwer/Plenum Press, 2001).
- Judith Blau, Vicki L. Lamb, Elizabeth Stearns, and Lisa Pellerin, "Cosmopolitan Environments and Adolescents’ Achievement Gains," Sociology of Education 74 (April 2001): 121–138
- Mutangandura, Gladys B.; Lamb, Vicki; Blau, Judith (2002). "External Debt and Secondary Education in Sub-Saharan Africa". Journal of African Policy Studies. 8: 1–16.
- Blau, Judith; Moller, Stephanie; Jones, Lyle V. (2004). "Why Test? Talent Loss and Enrollment Loss". Social Science Research. 33 (3): 409–434. doi:10.1016/j.ssresearch.2003.09.002.
- Judith Blau, "What Would Sartre Say? What Would Arendt Reply?" Social Forces: 85(2007):1063-1078 Judith Blau, "Globalization," Interview in Islamic Perspectives (Tehran and London), 2 (2010):
- Blau, Judith (2014). "Human Rights: Two Paradoxes". Islamic Perspectives: Journal of Islamic Studies & Humanities. 11: 1–9.
- Judith Blau, "ASA Member Resolution on the Iraq War: Response to Criticisms," Footnotes of the American Sociological Association 31 (September/October 2003): 14.
- Blau, Judith (2016). "What the United States Might Learn From the Rest of the World, and, Yes, from American Sociology". Sociological Forum. 32 (4): 333–357.
- Judith Blau, “We Are All in the Same Canoe.” CounterPunch.org, 11 Aug. 2023, www.counterpunch.org/2023/08/11/we-are-all-in-the-same-canoe/. Accessed 11 Sept. 2023.

== See also ==
https://sociology.unc.edu/files/2018/08/Judith-Blau-CV-Aug-2018.pdf
