= Peter Blau =

American sociologist (1918–2002)

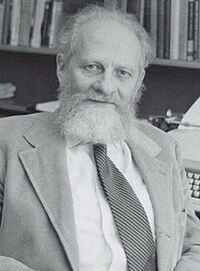
- Born: Peter Michael Blau; February 7, 1918; Vienna, Austria-Hungary
- Died: March 12, 2002 (aged 84); Carrboro, North Carolina

Education
- Education: Elmhurst College, Columbia University
- Thesis: The Dynamics of Bureaucratic Structure: A Study of Interpersonal Relations in Two Government Agencies (1952)
- Doctoral advisor: Robert K. Merton

Philosophical work
- Era: 20th-century
- Main interests: Macrosociology, Organizational sociology, Social structures, Stratification, Bureaucracy, Social exchange theory
- Notable ideas: Co-founder of Organizational sociology (with James Samuel Coleman, Alvin Ward Gouldner, Seymour Martin Lipset, Philip Selznick)

Peter Michael Blau (February 7, 1918 – March 12, 2002) was an Austrian and American sociologist and theorist. Born in Vienna, Austria, he immigrated to the United States in 1939. He completed his PhD doctoral thesis with Robert K. Merton at Columbia University in 1952, laying an early theory for the dynamics of bureaucracy. The next year, he was offered a professorship at the University of Chicago, where he taught from 1953 to 1970. He also taught as Pitt Professor at Cambridge University in Great Britain, as a senior fellow at King's College, and as a Distinguished Honorary professor at Tianjin Academy of Social Sciences which he helped to establish. In 1970 he returned to Columbia University, where he was awarded the lifetime position of professor emeritus. From 1988 to 2000 he taught as the Robert Broughton Distinguished Research Professor at University of North Carolina, Chapel Hill in the same department as his wife, Judith Blau, while continuing to commute to New York to meet with graduate students and colleagues.

His sociological specialty was in organizational and social structures. He formulated theories relating to many aspects of social phenomena, including upward mobility, occupational opportunity, and heterogeneity. From each of his theories, he deduced an hypothesis which he would test against large scale empirical research. He was one of the first sociological theorists to use high level statistics to develop sociology as a scientific discipline using macro-level empirical data to gird theory. He also produced theories on how population structures can influence human behavior.

One of Blau's most important contributions to social theory is his work regarding exchange theory, which explains how small-scale social exchange directly relates to social structures at a societal level.

He also was the first to map out the wide variety of social forces, dubbed "Blau space" by Miller McPherson. This idea was one of the first to take individuals and distribute them along a multidimensional space. Blau-space is still used as a guide by sociologists and has been expanded to include areas of sociology never specifically covered by Blau himself.

In 1974 Blau served as the 65th president of the American Sociological Association.

== Early life and family background ==
Peter Blau was born in 1918 in Vienna, a few months before the Austro-Hungarian Empire collapsed. He was raised in a Jewish family as fascist power within Europe grew and Hitler's influence within Austria became increasingly evident. At the age of seventeen, Blau was convicted of high treason for speaking out against government repression in articles he wrote for an underground newspaper of the Social Democratic Worker's Party and was subsequently incarcerated. Blau was given a ten-year sentence in the federal prison in Vienna. He was then released shortly after his imprisonment when the ban on political activity was lifted due to the National Socialists' rise to power. When Nazi Germany annexed Austria, Blau attempted to escape to Czechoslovakia on March 13, 1938. Both Blau and his sister—who was sent to England—managed to escape. The rest of his family, however, decided to stay in Austria. Blau's original attempt to flee proved unsuccessful as he was captured by Nazi border patrol and was imprisoned for two months. During the two months he was detained, he was tortured, starved, and was forced to eat only lard. Yet, he was once again released and made his way to Prague. When Hitler occupied Czechoslovakia, he escaped again, returning illegally to Vienna to visit one more time with his parents. In the dark of night, Blau hid on a train to cross the border into France. There he turned himself in to the Allied forces, who had not yet reversed their policy of putting anyone with a German passport—even the Jews—into labor camps. He spent several weeks as a POW of France crushing grapes in Bordeaux. When the policy about Jews was reversed, he was able to continue his journey to Le Havre, France where he received a refugee scholarship to Elmhurst College in Illinois through a group of missionaries studying at the theological seminary. Blau emigrated to America on the Degrasse ship and landed in New York on January 1, 1939. He later attended Elmhurst College, earning his degree in sociology in 1942, and becoming a United States citizen in 1943. Blau returned to Europe 1943 as a member of the United States Army, acting as an interrogator given his skills in the German language and was awarded the bronze star for his duties. It was during this time that Blau also received word that his family had been killed at Auschwitz.

== Later life ==
After receiving his bachelor's degree from Elmhurst College, Blau continued his education at Columbia University, where he received his PhD in 1952. One of Blau's most memorable and significant contributions to the field of sociology came in 1967. Working together with Otis Dudley Duncan and Andrea Tyree, he co-authored The American Occupational Structure, which provided a meaningful sociological contribution to the study of social stratification, and won the highly touted Sorokin Award from the American Sociological Association in 1968. Blau is also known for his contributions to sociological theory. Exchange and Power in Social Life (1964) was an important contribution to contemporary exchange theory, one of Blau's distinguished theoretical orientations. The aim of this work was "(to analyze) the processes that govern the associations among men as a prolegomenon of a theory of social structure". In it, Blau makes the effort to take micro-level exchange theory and apply it to social structures at a macro-level. Blau was also very active in the study of structural theory. Blau's 1977 book, Inequality and Heterogeneity, presents "a macro sociological theory of social structure" where the foundation of his theory "is a quantitative conception of social structure in terms of the distributions of people among social positions that affect their social relations".

Blau received notable distinctions for his achievements, which include: election to the National Academy of Sciences, the American Academy of Arts and Sciences, and the American Philosophical Society. He also served as the president of the American Sociological Association from 1973 to 1974. He died on March 12, 2002, of acute respiratory distress syndrome. He was eighty-four years old.

== Theory ==
For Blau, sociological theories were produced through logical deduction. Blau began theoretical studies by making a broad statement or basic assumption regarding the social world, which was then proven by the logical predictions it produced. Blau claimed these statements could not be validated or refuted based on one empirical test. Instead, it was a theory's "logical implications" that could be trusted, more so than an empirical test. Only if continued empirical tests contradicted the theory could the theory be modified, or dropped entirely if a new theory was proposed in its place. Blau's trust in logic and his deductive approach to social theory aligns him closely with the philosophy of positivism and traditional French sociologists, Auguste Comte and Émile Durkheim. Blau also focused his sociological theory on both the micro and macro level, and often connected the two throughout his research.

=== Population structures ===
Population structures and their relationship with social interaction was another primary interest within Blau's work. Blau believed that population structure created guidelines for specific human behaviors, especially intergroup relations. Blau created a number of theories explaining aspects of population structure that increased chances of intergroup relations. Blau viewed social structure as being somewhat stable, but he did identify two phenomena that he believed contributed to structural change within a population: social mobility and conflict. Blau thought social mobility, which he described as "any movement within a population by an individual," was beneficial to intergroup relations within a population structure, and theorized various scenarios involving social relations and mobility. Blau also theorized explanations for structural causes of conflict, focusing on population distribution as a cause of conflict separate from individual or political issues. According to Blau, structural conflict is linked to the inequality of status of groups, size of group, social mobility between groups, and the probability of social contact between groups. Blau determined that prevention of conflict within a population structure can be achieved through "multi-group affiliations and intersection in complex societies".

=== Social exchange theory ===
Social exchange provides an explanation of the interactions and relationships Blau observed while researching. He believed that social exchange could reflect behavior oriented to socially mediated goals. Peter started from the premise that social interaction has value to people, and he explored the forms and sources of this value in order to understand collective outcomes, such as the distribution of power in a society. People engage in social interactions in which we would not think deep about, but Blau suggested it is for the same reason why people engage in economic transactions. They need something from other people, the exchange. That then leads to an increase in social exchange in which people attempt to stay out of debt because it gives them an advantage, as well as potential power. Although social exchange can be genuine, when the goal for the individual to stay out of debt or to get something in return, it is selfishness. "The tendency to help others is frequently motivated by the expectation that doing so will bring social rewards" Blau explained that social exchange between individuals either stem from inherent rewards (things such as love or admiration) or external rewards (money, etc.). Blau expressed the difference between social exchange and the purchasing of goods, stating that there is an emotional component within social exchange that is nonexistent in everyday transactions.

Blau also studied the social exchange that occurs within relationships. He believed that most thriving friendships occur when both participants are the same status level, allowing for an equal potential for exchange and benefit throughout the relationship. He also studied the social exchange of partners, and how these relationships come together in the first place. Blau explains how loving relationships come to existence through the exchange of certain favorable traits that would attract one person to another. Blau discusses how status, beauty, and wealth are some of the key characteristics that people search for in a partner, and that the most successful relationships occur when both partners have valuable attributes that they can benefit from.

=== Organizational theory ===
Some of Blau's first major contributions to sociology were in the field of organizations. His first publication, Dynamics of Bureaucracy (1955), prompted a wave of post-Weberian organizational studies. Organizational research consisted in exploring to what extent the received image of the Weberian bureaucracy—an efficient, mechanical system of roles—held up under close scrutiny in the empirical study of social interaction within organizations. Blau, in his research and study, highlighted the ways in which the real life of the organization was structured along informal channels of interaction and socio-emotional exchange. Blau conducted a different approach in the main subject group for organizational sociology, focusing far more on white-collar workers rather than those of the blue-collar status, concentrating on the relationships between workers. He also discussed how the incipient status systems formed were important to the continued functioning of these organizations as the formal status structure. Hence, much of Blau's work involving organizations centered on the interplay between formal structure, informal practices, and bureaucratic pressures and how these processes affect organizational change.

Blau's second major contribution to organizational analysis revolved around the study of determinants of the "bureaucratic components" of organizations. He collected data on 53 Employment Security Agencies in the US and 1,201 local offices. The result of this research was Blau's (1970) general theory of differentiation in organizations. This piece had an immediate impact in the field of organizations and more importantly American sociology.

Blau derived several generalizations, the most important which are (1) increasing size results in an increase in the number of distinct positions (differentiation) in an organization at a decreasing rate, and (2) as size increases the administrative component (personnel not directly engaged in production but in coordination) decreases. This specific work, however, had a brief influence as organization sociology moved away from monothetic generalizations about determinants of intra-organizational structure and to the study of organizational environments.

=== Macrostructural theory of social structure ===
Probably one of the biggest contributions Blau gave to sociology was his work in macrostructural theory. For him, social structure consisted of the networks of social relations that organize patterns of interaction across different social positions. During this time, many people had different definitions for social structure. Blau's definition, however, set him apart from the rest. For Blau, social structure did not consist of natural persons, but instead social positions. This meant that the "parts" of social structure were classes of people such as men, women, rich and poor. Blau believed that the root of social structure can be found whenever an undifferentiated group begins to separate itself along some socially relevant distinction. In Blau's eyes, one could not speak of social structure without speaking of the differentiation of people. He believes that it is these social distinctions along with some social characteristics (race, religion, age, gender, etc.) which determines who interacts with whom. His theory gave a more structured idea of "homophily" which describes the observation that people are drawn to others like themselves. This is because of structure although individuals may seem to have other interests but those are structurally produced as well. Blau coined the term "parameter of social structure" to refer to socially relevant positions that people could be classified as. Something could not be considered a parameter if it did not actually affect the social relations of individuals "on the ground".

In his 1974 Presidential Address, "Parameters of Social Structure", Blau discussed two categories of parameters: graduated and nominal. For Blau, modern society was characterized by the fact that they were composed of (1) multiplicity of socially relevant positions and (2) that these positions were connected and sometimes in contradictory ways resulting in cross-cutting social circles. Two positions are contradictory if one interaction increase leads to interaction of another decreasing.

== Quotation ==
One of his most famous quotations is: "One cannot marry an eskimo, if no eskimo is around".

The stated "goal" of Peter Blau's work was: "An understanding of social structure on the basis of an analysis of the social processes that govern the relations between individuals and groups. The basic question ... is how social life becomes organized into increasingly complex structures of associations among men."

== Legacy ==
Peter Blau played an important role in shaping the field of modern sociology and is one of the most influential post-war American sociologists. He is sometimes considered the last great "grand theorist" of twentieth century American sociology. While Blau's work in the differentiation of organizations was short-lived, his style of research was not. He provided an exemplar of how to do research and how to build theory. He proved that general and valuable deductive theory was possible in sociology. Blau eventually paved the way for many young sociologists that then used similar styles of research and deductive theory. In addition to that, he, along with the help of Otis Dudley Duncan, introduced multiple regression and path analysis to the sociological audience. These two methods are currently the go-to methods of quantitative sociology. Blau's foundational theories continue to give momentum for development in social science and his ideas are still widely used.

== Works ==
- Dynamics of Bureaucracy (1955)
- Bureaucracy in Modern Society (1956) 2nd ed. (1971) with Marshall W. Meyer
- "A Theory of Social Integration", The American Journal of Sociology, Vol. LXV, No. 6, p. 545 (1960)
- A Theory of Social Integration (1960)
- Formal Organizations: A Comparative Approach, with Richard Scott (1962)
- Exchange and Power in Social Life (1964)
- "The Flow of Occupational Supply and Recruitment", American Sociology Review (1965)
- The American Occupational Structure (1967)
- A Formal Theory of Differentiation in Organizations (1970)
- The Organization of Academic Work (1973)
- "Presidential Address: Parameters of Social Structure", American Sociology Review (1974)
- On the Nature of Organizations (1974)
- Approaches to the Study of Social Structure, (editor). New York: The Free Press A Division of Macmillan Publishing Co., Inc. (1975)
- Inequality and Heterogeneity: A Primitive Theory of Social Structure (1977)
- Crosscutting Social Circles: Testing a Macrostructural Theory of Intergroup Relations, with Joseph E. Schwartz (1984)
- Structural Contexts of Opportunities (1994)
- A Circuitous Path to Macrostructural Theory (1995)
