= Otis Dudley Duncan =

Otis Dudley Duncan (December 2, 1921 in Nocona, Texas – November 16, 2004, in Santa Barbara, California) was an American sociologist and statistician. According to sociologist and statistician Leo Goodman he was "the most important quantitative sociologist in the world in the latter half of the 20th century". His book The American Occupational Structure, which received the American Sociological Association's Sorokin Award, documented how parents transmit their societal status to their children.

== Biography and career ==
Otis Dudley Duncan advocated for quantitative social science in the second half of the twentieth century. His key scholarly contributions include the introduction of path analysis to sociology; the measurement of occupational socioeconomic standing with an index (Duncan Socioeconomic Index); the study of intergenerational occupational mobility; the spatial analysis of residential patterns; the application and advancement of log-linear models and Rasch models for categorical social science data; and a landmark treatise on social measurement (Duncan 1984).

Duncan's best known work is a 1967 book that he coauthored with Peter Blau, The American Occupational Structure. Based on quantitative analyses of the first large national survey of social mobility in the United States, the book elegantly depicts the process by which parents transmit their social standing to their children, particularly through affecting the children's education. The book's impact went far beyond its analyses of occupational mobility. Using survey data and statistical techniques, it showed how an important sociological topic could be analyzed effectively and rigorously with appropriate quantitative methods. The work helped inspire a new generation of sociologists to pursue quantitative sociology. Today a worldwide community of sociologists specializing in social stratification and social mobility still work on elaborating the Blau-Duncan model to include such additional factors as cognitive ability, race, and social context in studying the transmission of social standing from one generation to the next.

Duncan retired in 1987, taking up pursuits such as composing electronic music and computer graphics. In 2000 he joined his local Humanist Society which led him to publish new work on the prevalence of creationism, tolerance of atheists, support for euthanasia and other such issues.

Duncan was an elected member of both the United States National Academy of Sciences and the American Philosophical Society.

== Selected publications ==
- Duncan, Otis D, and Albert J. Reiss. Social Characteristics of Urban and Rural Communities, 1950. New York: Wiley, 1956
- Duncan, Otis Dudley. 1975. Introduction to Structural Equation Models. New York: Academic Press.
- Blau, Peter M., Otis Dudley Duncan and Andrea Tyree (1967). The American Occupational Structure. New York: Wiley and Sons.
- Duncan, Otis Dudley (1984). Notes on Social Measurement, Historical and Critical. New York: Russell Sage Foundation.
- Duncan, O. D. and Duncan, B. The Negro population of Chicago. Chicago: University of Chicago Press, 1957

== See also ==
- Occupational prestige
